= Octopine dehydrogenase family =

NAD/NADP octopine/nopaline dehydrogenase, alpha-helical domain
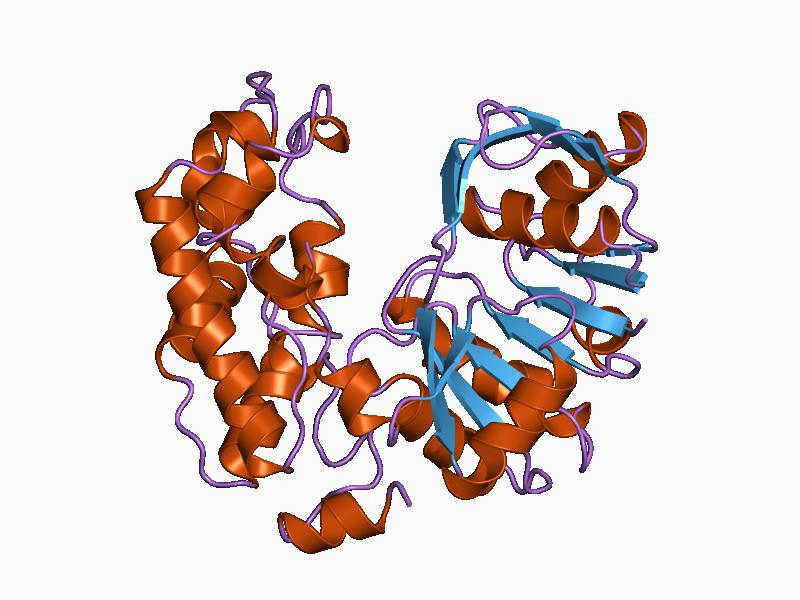
- crystal structure of the n-(1-d-carboxylethyl)-l-norvaline dehydrogenase from arthrobacter sp. strain 1c

Identifiers
- Symbol: Octopine_DH
- Pfam: PF02317
- InterPro: IPR003421
- SCOP2: 1bg6 / SCOPe / SUPFAM
Available protein structures:
- PDB: IPR003421 PF02317 (ECOD; PDBsum)
- AlphaFold: IPR003421; PF02317

In molecular biology, the octopine dehydrogenase family of enzymes act on the CH-NH substrate bond using NAD(+) or NADP(+) as an acceptor. The family includes octopine dehydrogenase EC 1.5.1.11, nopaline dehydrogenase EC 1.5.1.19, lysopine dehydrogenase EC 1.5.1.16 and opine dehydrogenase EC 1.5.1.-. NADPH is the preferred cofactor, but NADH is also used. Octopine dehydrogenase is involved in the reductive condensation of arginine and pyruvic acid to D-octopine.

Opine dehydrogenases can be found in both bacteria and marine cephalopods. In bacteria, some of these opine dehydrogenases are involved in crown gall tumours that are produced by Agrobacterium spp., and which encode for the opine dehydrogenases on a Ti-plasmid. These bacteria can transfer a portion of this plasmid (T-DNA) to a susceptible plant cell; the T-DNA then integrates into the plant nuclear genome, where its genes can be expressed. Some of these genes direct the synthesis and secretion of unusual amino acid and sugar derivatives called opines - these opines are used as a carbon and sometimes a nitrogen source by the infecting bacteria.

Opine dehydrogenases are also found in the marine invertebrate cephalopods (octopuses, squid, and cuttlefish). For example, in marine cephalopods, octopine dehydrogenase activity in mantle muscle is significantly correlated with a species' ability to buffer the acidic end products of anaerobic metabolism, with activity declining strongly with a species' habitat depth.
