= D-lysopine dehydrogenase =

Identifiers
- EC no.: 1.5.1.16
- CAS no.: 65187-41-9

Databases
- BRENDA: enzyme data
- ExPASy: NiceZyme view
- KEGG: enzyme entry
- MetaCyc: metabolic pathway
- Rhea: reactions
- PDB structures: RCSB PDB PDBe PDBsum
- Gene Ontology: AmiGO / QuickGO
Search
- PMC: articles
- PubMed: articles
- NCBI: proteins

In enzymology, D-lysopine dehydrogenase (EC 1.5.1.16) is an enzyme that catalyzes the chemical reaction

D-lysopine
+ NADP^{+}
H_{2}O
H^{+}
H_{2}O
H^{+}
L-lysine
+ NADPH +
pyruvic acid

The three substrates of this enzyme are D-lysopine, oxidised nicotinamide adenine dinucleotide phosphate (NADP^{+}), and water. Its products are L-lysine, reduced NADPH, pyruvic acid, and a proton.

This enzyme belongs to the family of oxidoreductases, specifically those acting on the CH-NH group of donors with NAD+ or NADP+ as acceptor. The systematic name of this enzyme class is N2-(D-1-carboxyethyl)-L-lysine:NADP+ oxidoreductase (L-lysine-forming). Other names in common use include D-lysopine synthase, lysopine dehydrogenase, D(+)-lysopine dehydrogenase, 2-N-(D-1-carboxyethyl)-L-lysine:NADP+ oxidoreductase, and (L-lysine-forming). This enzyme participates in lysine degradation.

D-lysopine is an opine, a compound found in plant crown gall tumors or hairy root tumors produced by pathogenic bacteria of the genus Agrobacterium and Rhizobium.
