= Ri plasmid =

Ri-Plasmid of R. rhizogenes

The root inducing (Ri) -plasmid of Rhizobium rhizogenes (formerly Agrobacterium rhizogenes) is a plasmid capable of undergoing horizontal gene transfer of its transfer DNA (T-DNA), upon contact with a plant host. The T-DNA of the Ri-plasmid affects the plant host by modifying organ differentiation patterns, enhancing cell division, and making the abnormal tissue produce opines to feed the bacterium. The genes responsible for the two former activities have been described as oncogenes.

== Gene content ==
Like the tumor-inducing Ti plasmid (pTi) found in Agrobacterium tumefaciens, the Ri plasmid contains everything a bacterium needs to cause disease to the plant and to reap the benefits of this parasitism: the T-DNA for delivery to the plant, the vir (virulence) operon for T4SS gene injection, and various genes for catabolizing (feeding on) the opines the T-DNA causes the plant to produce. Also like Ti plasmids, the Ri plasmids are classified based on the type of opines produced, and four have been described so far: the agropine, cucumopine, mannopine, and mikinopine types.

All Ri plasmids contain at least one piece of T-DNA, consisting of the opine synthesis genes, root oncogenic loci (rol) genes (rolA, rolB, rolC and rolD) and a number of other genes with unidentified functions, simply named open reading frames (ORFs). The rol genes cause the hallmark hairy root phenotype without directly producing any plant hormones. The agropine Ri-plasmid contains two pieces of T-DNA, called T_{L} and T_{R} (left and right, resp.). The T_{L}-DNA contains the rol genes. The T_{R}-DNA resembles the T-DNA of the pTi, and carries two auxin biosynthesis genes (aux1 and aux2), homologous to the pTi tms1 and tms2 regions, as well as three opine synthesis genes. This additional capability for plant hormone synthesis adds to the effect of the rol genes.

== The Ri-phenotype ==
Upon infection with R. rhizogenes and subsequent integration of the Ri-plasmid, the host plant displays phenotypical characteristics aptly named the hairy root disease with the so-called Ri-phenotype. The phenotypical changes include but are not limited to increased, agravitropic root growth and root hair growth, shortened internodes, wrinkled leaves and reduced apical dominance, dwarfism and early flowering. Several of these physical traits are of interest in the commercial breeding of horticultural and agricultural plants.

The different rol genes have been shown to have different effects on their host plant, both when incorporated into the plant genome separately and in combination with one another; for example, rolA has been shown to exhibit inhibitory effects on the rolB and rolC domains, and rolC is by now essentially known to induce dwarfism in its plant host.
