= Georges Pelletier =

Georges Pelletier may refer to:

- Georges Pelletier (agronomist)
- Georges Pelletier (doctor)
