= Allorhizobium vitis =

Scientific classification
- Domain: Bacteria
- Kingdom: Pseudomonadati
- Phylum: Pseudomonadota
- Class: Alphaproteobacteria
- Order: Hyphomicrobiales
- Family: Rhizobiaceae
- Genus: Allorhizobium
- Species: A. vitis

Binomial name
- Allorhizobium vitis (Ophel and Kerr 1990) Mousavi et al. 2016

Synonyms
- Agrobacterium vitis Ophel and Kerr 1990; Rhizobium vitis (Ophel and Kerr 1990) Young et al. 2001

Species of bacterium

Allorhizobium vitis is a plant pathogen that infects grapevines. The species is best known for causing a tumor known as crown gall disease. One of the virulent strains, A. vitis S4, is responsible both for crown gall on grapevines and for inducing a hypersensitive response in other plant species. Grapevines that have been affected by crown gall disease produce fewer grapes than unaffected plants. Though not all strains of A. vitis are tumorigenic, most strains can damage plant hosts.

A. vitis shares many genetic and morphological characteristics with several Agrobacterium species, including A. tumefaciens. The two species have overlapping host ranges, and both A. vitis and A. tumefaciens may reduce the yield of infected crops. For this reason, research on A. vitis focuses on transmission and methods of control.

== Biology ==
=== Identification ===
A. vitis is a Gram-negative bacterium with a thin peptidoglycan layer in its cell wall. The species is aerobic and mesophilic, with individual cells that are rod-shaped and motile. On culture, colonies are round, white, and translucent.

=== Range and environment ===
The presence of A. vitis has been confirmed in Germany, France, Austria, Hungary, South Africa, and the United States. Crown gall disease outbreaks in Europe and North America in the mid-1980s have been linked to A. vitis, and the species has continued to survive in those regions. Additionally, a survey conducted in China from 2003 to 2009 identified strains of A. vitis on blighted banana plants.

== Genetic traits ==
=== Chromosome and plasmids ===
The genome of A. vitis consists of two circular chromosomes and five plasmids. It is 6.32 Mb long and encodes 5549 proteins. Four rRNA operons have been identified. Tumorigenic strains contain a Ti plasmid (pTi). Ti plasmids in galls produce various opines that are then secreted from the gall. In a vitis, pTi codes for octopine and/or cucumopine. Tumorigenic strains also contain a plasmid that allows the bacterium to utilize tartrate.

=== Classification ===
A. vitis was formerly referred to as Agrobacterium biovar III. Originally, the species included only biovar III strains found in grape hosts. Since then, A. vitis has been redefined to include all biovar III strains. It can be distinguished from biovars I and II, A. tumefaciens and A. rhizogenes, on the basis of its hosts and pathogenicity. Fatty acid analysis also reveals differences between A. vitis and other strains of tumorigenic bacteria.

A. vitis has also been classified in the genus Rhizobium. A 1999 study suggested that A. vitis is more closely related to Rhizobium galegae than to other Agrobacterium species, based on genetic sequence comparison. In 2001, Young et al. proposed that A. vitis be reclassified as Rhizobium vitis. More recently, A. vitis was transferred to the genus Allorhizobium.

== Pathogenicity ==
=== Hosts ===
Grapevines are the plants most commonly infected with A. vitis. Though A. vitis may cause hypersensitive response in other plant species, crown gall disease induced by tumorigenic A. vitis is unique to grapevines. All strains of A. vitis induce grape root necrosis. Because A. vitis may remain latent, not all infected plants show symptoms.

An intraspecific taxon of A. vitis has been isolated from banana leaves in China. A. vitis may also infect tomato plants, and has been shown to cause leaf panel collapse in tobacco.

=== Transmission ===
The Ti plasmid is responsible for transmission of crown gall disease in plants infected with A. vitis. Tumorigenic A. vitis transfers its Ti plasmid to other bacteria, and transfers T-DNA into plants. Virulence genes encoded by the Ti plasmid generate single-strand T-DNA molecules, which in turn are transferred to healthy hosts. Disorganized cell division occurs in infected hosts, leading to gall development instead of the formation of healthy vascular tissue.

Propagation of diseased wood often transmits A. vitis. Injuries to a grapevine caused by cutting or freezing may also make the plant more susceptible to crown gall infection. However, galls grow only on trunks or canes, and do not appear on the roots of infected plants.

== In Agriculture ==
=== Crown gall disease ===
When A. vitis causes crown gall disease, several symptoms and tests can be used to identify its presence. On grapevines, young galls appear as soft green bumps, which later become brown and rough. Galls do not appear on all grapevines in which A. vitis is present.

Steps can be taken to control crown gall disease and reduce the risk of infection. Injured sites on vines, such as those caused by freezing or cutting injuries, are especially susceptible to infection. Planting in frost-prone areas or areas with poor drainage should therefore be avoided. Reducing other grapevine stressors, such as nutrient deprivation and low soil pH, also limits susceptibility. Additionally, some cultivars are resistant to crown gall disease. Vitis vinifera is generally susceptible to crown gall disease, but resistant grape species can be planted preferentially.

=== Other diseases ===
Grape necrosis is a common symptom of A. vitis infection, caused by both tumorigenic and non-tumorigenic bacteria strains. Tobacco leaf panel collapse can be induced by the non-tumorigenic F2/5 strain of A. vitis. While the strain of A. vitis found in grapevines, A. vitis pv. vitis, is responsible for most diseases, banana leaf blights have been linked to A. vitis pv. musae.

=== Nonpathogenic strains ===
Strains of bacteria can be used as biological control agents to limit the growth of pathogenic A. vitis. Grapevine roots that have been soaked in a suspension containing the inhibitory strain are less susceptible than those that have not. Several ACC deaminase-producing species found in the rhizosphere inhibit A. vitis tumor production in tomato plants. Non-tumorigenic strains of A. vitis (F2/5, ARK-1, and VAR03-1) have been shown to limit crown gall formation. In investigations involving these strains, F2/5 still induced necrosis but ARK-1 did not.
