= Agroinfiltration =

Method in plant biotechnology

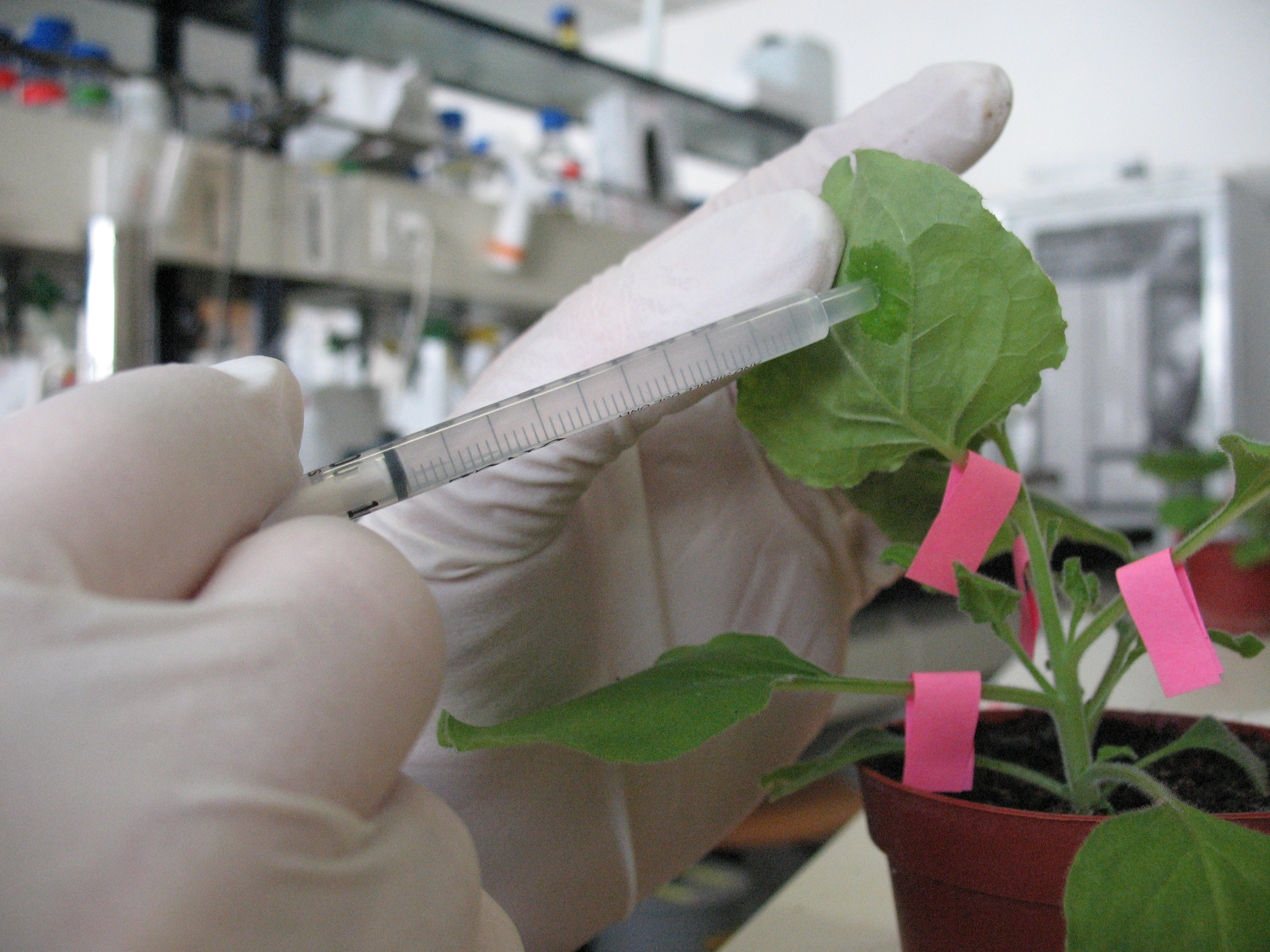

Agroinfiltration is a method used in plant biology and especially lately in plant biotechnology to induce transient expression of genes in a plant, or isolated leaves from a plant, or even in cultures of plant cells, in order to produce a desired protein. In the method, a suspension of Agrobacterium tumefaciens is introduced into a plant leaf by direct injection or by vacuum infiltration, or brought into association with plant cells immobilised on a porous support (plant cell packs), whereafter the bacteria transfer the desired gene into the plant cells via transfer of T-DNA. The main benefit of agroinfiltration when compared to the more traditional plant transformation is speed and convenience, although yields of the recombinant protein are generally also higher and more consistent.

The first step is to introduce a gene of interest to a strain of Agrobacterium tumefaciens. Subsequently, the strain is grown in a liquid culture and the resulting bacteria are washed and suspended into a suitable buffer solution. For injection, this solution is then placed in a syringe (without a needle). The tip of the syringe is pressed against the underside of a leaf while simultaneously applying gentle counterpressure to the other side of the leaf. The Agrobacterium suspension is then injected into the airspaces inside the leaf through stomata, or sometimes through a tiny incision made to the underside of the leaf.

Vacuum infiltration is another way to introduce Agrobacterium deep into plant tissue. In this procedure, leaf disks, leaves, or whole plants are submerged in a beaker containing the solution, and the beaker is placed in a vacuum chamber. The vacuum is then applied, forcing air out of the intercellular spaces within the leaves via the stomata. When the vacuum is released, the pressure difference forces the "Agrobacterium" suspension into the leaves through the stomata into the mesophyll tissue. This can result in nearly all of the cells in any given leaf being in contact with the bacteria.

Once inside the leaf the Agrobacterium remains in the intercellular space and transfers the gene of interest as part of the Ti plasmid-derived T-DNA in high copy numbers into the plant cells. The gene transfer occurs when the plant signals are induced and physical contact is made between the plant cells and the bacteria. The bacteria create a mechanism that burrows a hole and transfers the new T-DNA strand into the plant cell. The T-DNA moves into the nucleus of the plant and begins to integrate into the plants' chromosome. The gene is then transiently expressed through RNA synthesis from appropriate promoter sequences in all transfected cells (no selection for stable integration is performed). The plant can be monitored for a possible effect in the phenotype, subjected to experimental conditions or harvested and used for purification of the protein of interest. Many plant species can be processed using this method, but the most common ones are Nicotiana benthamiana and less often, Nicotiana tabacum.

Transient expression in cultured plant cell packs is a new procedure, recently patented by the Fraunhofer Institute IVV, Germany. For this technique, suspension cultured cells of tobacco (e.g.: NT1 or BY2 cell lines of Nicotiana tabacum) are immobilised by filtration onto a porous support to form a well-aerated cell pack, then incubated with recombinant Agrobacterium for a time to allow T-DNA transfer, before refiltration to remove excess bacteria and liquid. Incubation of the cell pack in a humid environment for time periods up to several days allows transient expression of protein. Secreted proteins can be washed out of the cell pack by application of buffer and further filtration.

== Silencing suppressors in agroinfiltration ==
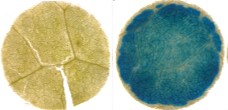
Agroinfiltration using a promoter::GUS construct in Nicotiana benthamiana with TBSV p19 (right leaf disc) and without TBSV p19 (left leaf disc).

It is quite common to coinfiltrate the Agrobacterium carrying the construct of interest together with another Agrobacterium carrying a silencing suppressor protein gene such as the one encoding the p19 protein from the plant pathogenic Tomato bushy stunt virus (TBSV), or the NSs protein from tomato spotted wilt virus (TSWV). TBSV was first discovered in 1935 in tomatoes and results in plants with stunted growth and deformed fruits. TSWV was discovered in tomatoes in Australia in 1915, and for many years was the only member of what is now known as genus Tospovirus, family Bunyaviridae. Acetosyringone is also commonly added to the agroinfiltration media to increase transformation efficiency, thus construct of interest expression.

In order to defend itself against viruses and other pathogens that introduce foreign nucleic acids into their cells, plants have developed a system of post-transcriptional gene silencing (PTGS) where small interfering RNAs are produced from double-stranded RNA in order to create a sequence specific degradation pathway that efficiently silence non-native genes. Many plant viruses have developed mechanisms that counter the plants PTGS-systems by evolving proteins, such as p19 and NSs, that interfere with the PTGS-pathway at different levels.

Although it is not clear exactly how p19 works to suppress RNA silencing, studies have shown that transiently expressed proteins in Nicotiana benthamiana leaves have an up to 50-fold higher yield when coinfiltrated with TBSV p19.

TSWV and other tospovirus NSs proteins have been shown to be effective as suppressors of both local and systemic silencing, and may be a useful alternative to p19 where the latter has been shown not to be effective. In other studies, p19 from artichoke mottled crinkle virus has been shown to have a similar, although weaker, effect to TBSV p19. However, it needs to be noted that the p19 protein is a recognised effector in certain plant species (e.g., Nicotiana tabacum pv. petit Gerard) that would trigger hypersensitive response.

== See also ==
- Agrobacterium
- Transient expression
