= Mary-Dell Chilton =

American biologist (1939–2026)

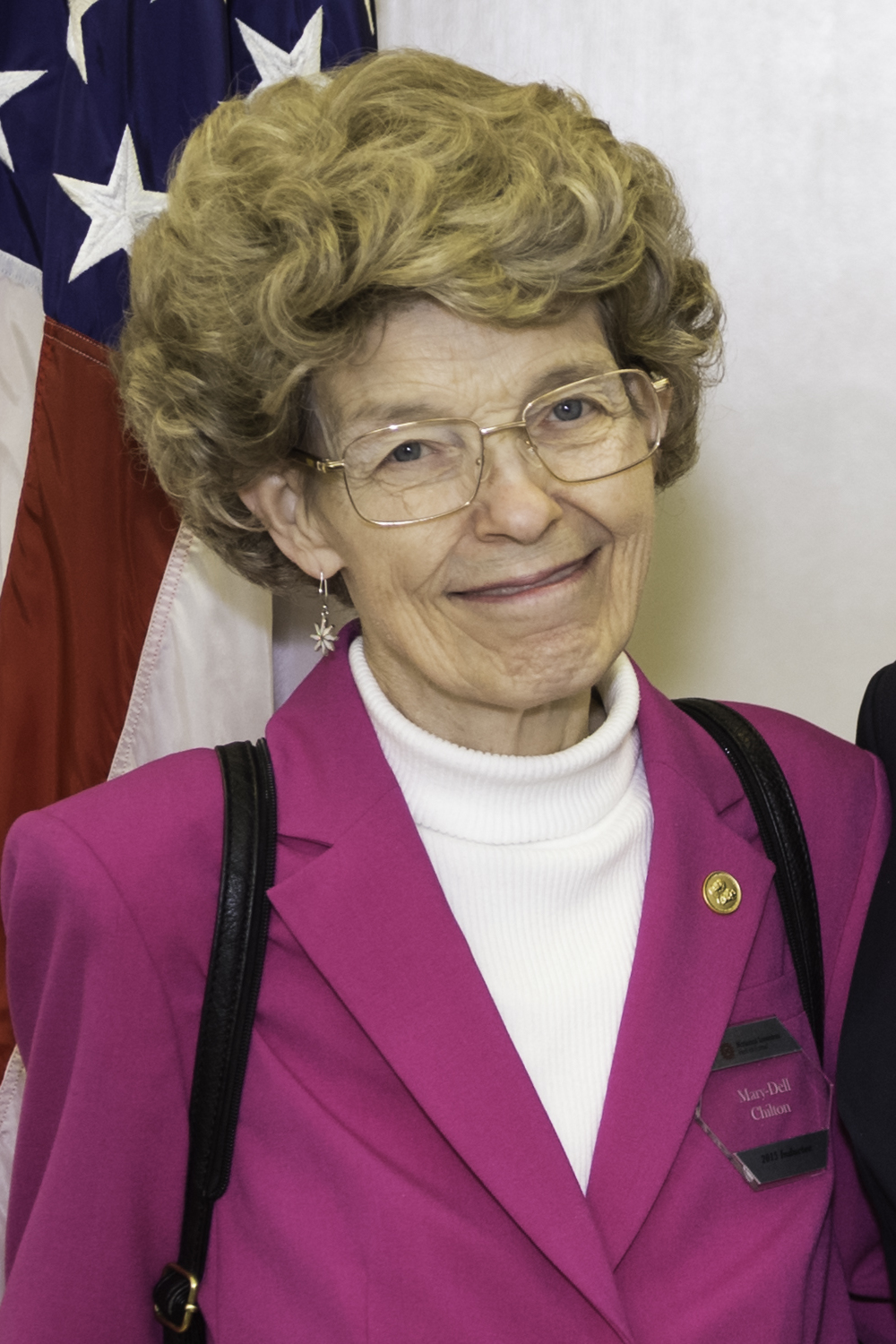
- Chilton in 2015
- Born: February 2, 1939; Indianapolis, Indiana, U.S.
- Died: June 24, 2026 (aged 87); Carrboro, North Carolina, U.S.
- Education: University of Illinois at Urbana–Champaign
- Known for: First genetically modified plants
- Children: 2
- Awards: World Food Prize; National Inventors Hall of Fame; National Medal of Technology and Innovation
- Scientific career
- Workplaces: Syngenta Biotechnology Inc
- Thesis: Transforming Activity in Single-Stranded DNA from Bacillus subtilis (1967)
- Doctoral advisor: Benjamin D. Hall
- Notable students: Michael W. Bevan, Elizabeth E. Hood

Mary-Dell Chilton (February 2, 1939 – June 24, 2026) was an American biochemist, inventor and writer who was one of the founders of modern plant biotechnology. She performed research at Washington University in St. Louis and was a Distinguished Science Fellow at Syngenta Biotechnology, Inc. Chilton was notable for her discovery of the presence of Agrobacterium Ti plasmid DNA fragments in the nuclear DNA of crown gall tissue in 1977.

During her career, she was awarded the World Food Prize (2013) and the National Medal of Technology and Innovation by President Joe Biden in 2023. She was also inducted into the National Inventors Hall of Fame.

== Early life and education ==
Chilton was born in Indianapolis, Indiana on February 2, 1939. She was raised by her grandmother in Southern Pines, North Carolina.

Chilton attended private school for her early education. She earned both a B.S. and Ph.D. in chemistry from the University of Illinois Urbana-Champaign. She later completed postdoctoral work at the University of Washington in Seattle.

== Career and research ==
Chilton taught and performed research at Washington University in St. Louis. While on faculty there in the late 1970s and early 1980s, she led a collaborative research study that produced the first transgenic plants. Her scientific achievements, Chilton was noted for work that led to the first genetically modified plants which contributed to the development of pest resistance and drought tolerance.

In 1977, Chilton was the first to demonstrate the presence of a fragment of Agrobacterium Ti plasmid DNA in the nuclear DNA of crown gall tissue. Her research on Agrobacterium also showed that the genes responsible for causing disease could be removed from the bacterium without adversely affecting its ability to insert its own DNA into plant cells and modify the plant's genome. Chilton described what she had done as disarming the bacterial plasmid responsible for the DNA transfer. She and her collaborators produced the first genetically modified plants using Agrobacterium carrying the disarmed Ti plasmid (1983). She has been called the "queen of Agrobacterium."

After her breakthroughs in the 1980s, Chilton moved to the private sector at Syngenta Biotechnology in Research Triangle Park, eventually becoming vice president of agricultural biotechnology and principal scientist. Chilton was author of more than 100 scientific publications. She was a Distinguished Science Fellow at Syngenta. She also worked with CIBA-Geigy Corporation, a legacy company of Syngenta.

== Personal life and death ==
Chilton was an avid canoer, with her last trip going through Stillwater Canyon in Utah at age 76. She had two sons, Mark and Andrew.

Chilton died at her home in Carrboro, North Carolina, on June 24, 2026, at the age of 87.

== Awards and honors ==
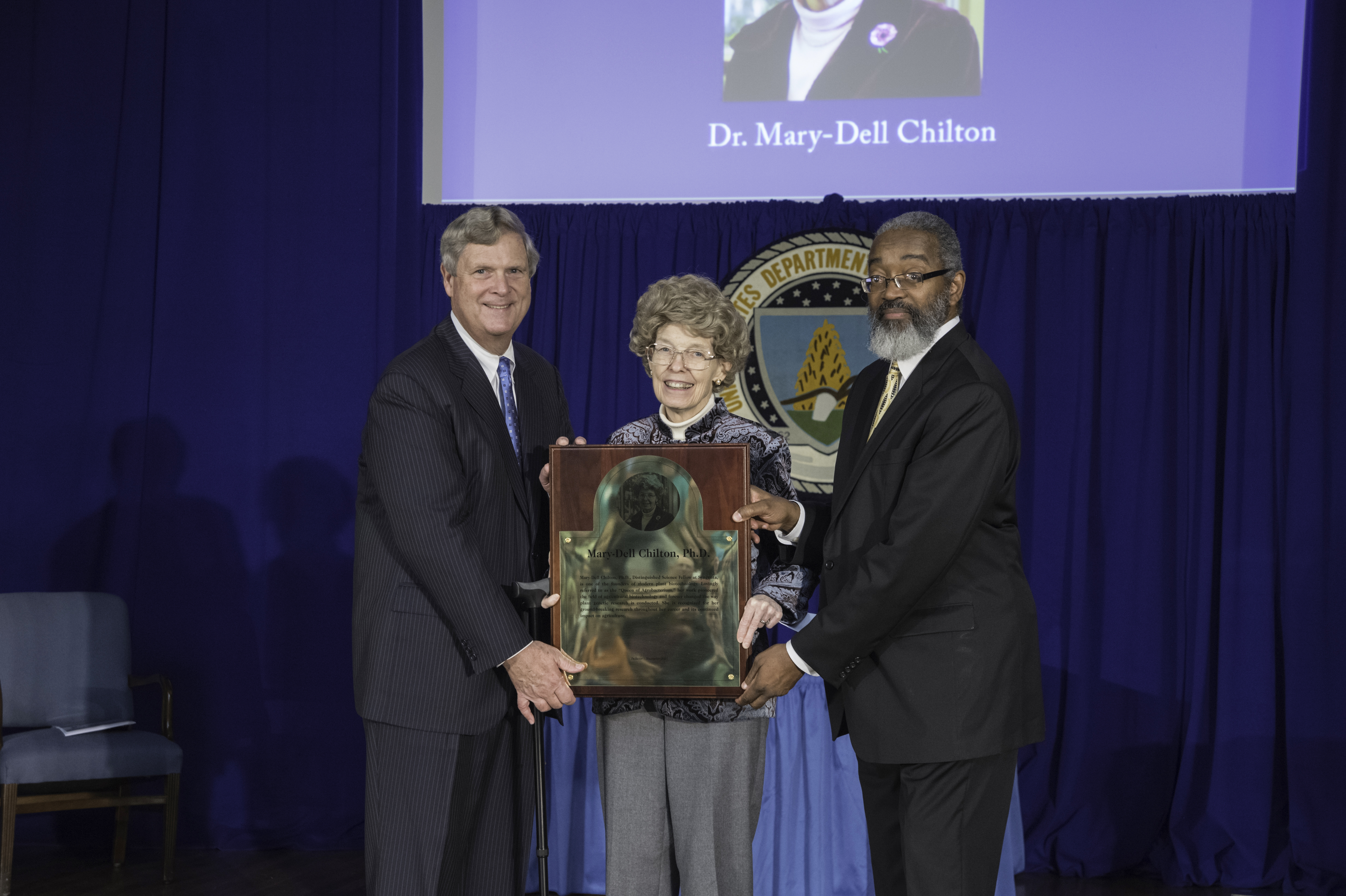
Chilton with U.S. Agriculture Secretary Tom Vilsack in 2015

For her work with Agrobacterium tumefaciens, Chilton was recognized with an honorary doctorate from the University of Louvaine, the John Scott Medal from the City of Philadelphia, membership in the United States National Academy of Sciences, and the Benjamin Franklin Medal in Life Sciences from the Franklin Institute.

Chilton was honored by the Crop Science Society of America in 2011 with the organization's Presidential Award. In honor of her many achievements, in 2002 Syngenta announced creation of the Mary-Dell Chilton Center – a new administrative and conference center which was added to the company's facility in Research Triangle Park, in North Carolina.

In June 2013, she was named a laureate of the prestigious 2013 World Food Prize. In 2015, Chilton was elected to the National Inventors Hall of Fame. In 2020, she was one of eight women featured in "The Only One in the Room" display at the Smithsonian National Museum of American History. Chilton was recognized as a Pioneer Member of the American Society of Plant Biologists.

In 2023, US President Joe Biden awarded Chilton the National Medal of Technology and Innovation.
