= Hairy root culture =

Type of plant tissue culture

Hairy root culture, also called transformed root culture, is a type of plant tissue culture that is used to study plant metabolic processes or to produce valuable secondary metabolites or recombinant proteins, often with plant genetic engineering.

A naturally occurring soil bacterium Agrobacterium rhizogenes that contains root-inducing plasmids (also called Ri plasmids) can infect plant roots and cause them to produce a food source for the bacterium, opines, and to grow abnormally. The abnormal roots are particularly easy to culture in artificial media because hormones are not needed in contrast to adventitious roots, and they are neoplastic, with indefinite growth. The neoplastic roots produced by A. rhizogenes infection have a high growth rate (compared to untransformed adventitious roots), as well as genetic and biochemical stability.

Currently the main constraint for commercial utilization of hairy root culture is the development and up-scaling of appropriate (bioreactors) vessels for the delicate and sensitive hairy roots.

Some of the applied research on utilization of hairy root cultures has been and is conducted at VTT Technical Research Centre of Finland. Other labs working on hairy roots are the phytotechnology lab of Amiens University and the Arkansas Biosciences Institute.

== Metabolic studies ==
Hairy root cultures can be used for phytoremediation, and are particularly valuable for studies of the metabolic processes involved in phytoremediation.

Further applications include detailed studies of fundamental molecular, genetic and biochemical aspects of genetic transformation and of hairy root induction.

== Genetically transformed cultures ==
The Ri plasmids can be engineered to also contain T-DNA, used for genetic transformation of the plant cells. The resulting genetically transformed root cultures can produce high levels of secondary metabolites, comparable or even higher than those of intact plants.

== Use in plant propagation ==
Hairy root culture can also be used for regeneration of whole plants and for production of artificial seeds.

== See also ==
- Crown gall, a plant disease with similar uses caused by a related bacterium, Agrobacterium tumefaciens
