= VirA protein =

VirA is a protein histidine kinase which senses certain sugars and phenolic compounds. These compounds are typically found from wounded plants, and as a result VirA is used by Agrobacterium tumefaciens to locate potential host organisms for infection. This detection is the first stage in the Ti plasmid transfer.
