= TDNA =

TDNA may refer to:

- Truth in Domain Names Act, an incorporation in the PROTECT Act of 2003
- Transfer DNA (or T-DNA), the transferred DNA of the tumor-inducing (Ti) plasmid of some species of bacteria such as Agrobacterium tumefaciens
