= Strombine dehydrogenase =

strombine dehydrogenase

Identifiers
- EC no.: 1.5.1.22
- CAS no.: 79393-84-3

Databases
- IntEnz: IntEnz view
- BRENDA: BRENDA entry
- ExPASy: NiceZyme view
- KEGG: KEGG entry
- MetaCyc: metabolic pathway
- PRIAM: profile
- PDB structures: RCSB PDB PDBe PDBsum
- Gene Ontology: AmiGO / QuickGO
Search
- PMC: articles
- PubMed: articles
- NCBI: proteins

In enzymology, strombine dehydrogenase (EC 1.5.1.22) is an enzyme that catalyzes the chemical reaction

strombine
+ NAD^{+}
H_{2}O
H^{+}
H_{2}O
H^{+}
glycine
+ NADH +
pyruvic acid

The three substrates of this enzyme are strombine, oxidised nicotinamide adenine dinucleotide (NAD^{+}), and water. Its products are glycine, reduced NADH, pyruvic acid, and a proton. Strombine, also known as (N-(carboxymethyl)-D-alanine), is a member of the class of compounds called opines.

This enzyme belongs to the family of oxidoreductases, specifically those acting on the CH-NH group of donor with NAD+ or NADP+ as acceptor. The systematic name of this enzyme class is N-(carboxymethyl)-D-alanine:NAD+ oxidoreductase (glycine-forming). Other names in common use include strombine[N-(carboxymethyl)-D-alanine]dehydrogenase, and N-(carboxymethyl)-D-alanine: NAD+ oxidoreductase.
