= Beta-alanopine dehydrogenase =

Enzyme

beta-alanopine dehydrogenase

Identifiers
- EC no.: 1.5.1.26
- CAS no.: 113573-64-1

Databases
- IntEnz: IntEnz view
- BRENDA: BRENDA entry
- ExPASy: NiceZyme view
- KEGG: KEGG entry
- MetaCyc: metabolic pathway
- PRIAM: profile
- PDB structures: RCSB PDB PDBe PDBsum
- Gene Ontology: AmiGO / QuickGO
Search
- PMC: articles
- PubMed: articles
- NCBI: proteins

Beta-alanopine dehydrogenase (EC 1.5.1.26) is an enzyme that catalyzes the chemical reaction

(R)-β-alanopine
+ NAD^{+}
H_{2}O
H^{+}
H_{2}O
H^{+}
β-Alanine
+ NADH +
pyruvic acid

The three substrates of this enzyme are (R)-β-alanopine, oxidised nicotinamide adenine dinucleotide (NAD^{+}), and water. Its products are β-alanine, reduced NADH, pyruvic acid and a proton. β-alanopine is a type of opine.

This enzyme belongs to the family of oxidoreductases, specifically those acting on the CH-NH group of donors with NAD+ or NADP+ as acceptor. The systematic name of this enzyme class is N-(D-1-carboxyethyl)-beta-alanine:NAD+ oxidoreductase (beta-alanine-forming).
