= Georges Pelletier (agronomist) =

French researcher

Georges Pelletier (born 1943) is a French agricultural engineer and Doctor of Science. He spent his career at the National Institute of Agricultural Research (INRA) in the Department of Plant Genetics and Improvement. He headed the Unit of the INRA Versailles Centre from 1991 to 1999, chaired from 2001 to 2010, the Operational Management Board of the Group of Scientific Interest in Plant Genomics Genoplant, and from 2010 to 2013 was appointed to the French Agency for Research (ANR) scientific manager of the Biotechnologies and Bio-resources programme for "Investments for the Future". He was a member of the Biomolecular Engineering Commission and the Scientific Council of the Genopoles. Member of the French Academy of sciences (2004) and the Academy of Agriculture (2004), he was awarded the Lauriers d'excellence de INRA (2006).

== Scientific work ==
His field of research has been the study of multiplication and reproduction mechanisms in angiosperms.

First, by generating haploid individuals, either by in vitro culture of immature pollen, in tobacco and asparagus, or by selecting fertilization anomalies that eliminate one of the parental genomes. This work has led to the clarification of sex determinism in asparagus, a dioecious species, and has provided the method for obtaining fully male F1 hybrid varieties, which have since been widely developed.

He developed a genetics of cytoplasmic organelles in higher plants by protoplast fusion, revealing the existence of almost systematic recombinations between mitochondrial genomes and the exchange of chloroplasts between the parents of these fusions. The application of these principles to the species of the Brassicaceae family has led to the discovery of the mitochondrial gene responsible for male sterility (absence of pollen) known as Ogura, which is found in the genus Raphanus. It is an additional gene whose only biological function is to block pollen formation. It is involved in gynodoecia (a species composed of females and hermaphrodites) in the genus Raphanus. The discovery of the gene responsible for male sterility, its transfer to Brassica by fusion of protoplasts, and the selection of mitochondrial recombinants with improved agronomic characteristics have enabled this male sterility to be widely distributed and exploited in Europe and North America for the production of hybrid varieties in rapeseed and various cabbage.

He showed that the gene transfer bacterium, Agrobacterium tumefaciens, introduced by simple infiltration into the plant, is unexpectedly capable of transferring its T-DNA to female gametes. An original method of transformation to create collections of "insertion mutants" in the Arabidopsis thaliana genome has been developed for his team to study the genes that control reproductive mechanisms, whether they are meiosis and recombination of chromosomes or gametogenesis, pollen and embryonic sac development. On a global scale, the method has been widely used as one of the major tools for functional analysis of the genome of A. thaliana, a plant model of plant genomics.

== Distinctions ==
- Jean-Dufrenoy Prize from the Académie d'agriculture de France in 1986;
- Doistaut-Blutet Prize of the French Academy of sciences in 1989;
- Laurier de la recherche agronomique de l'INRA in 2006.

== Decorations ==
- Officier of the Ordre national du Mérite. He was promoted to officier by decree on 13 May 2016. He was a Chevalier on January 30, 1992.
- Chevalier of the Ordre national de la Légion d'Honneur.
