= ODH =

Odh or ODH may refer to:

- RAF Odiham, a Royal Air Force station
- D-octopine dehydrogenase, an enzyme
- Ohio Department of Health
- Odh, a trigraph in Latin-script writing
- Olivia de Havilland, (1916–2020), actress
