= Albert Joyce Riker =

American plant pathologist (1894–1982)

Albert Joyce Riker (April 3, 1894 – February 21, 1982) was an American plant pathologist and professor at the University of Wisconsin–Madison.

Riker was born in Wheeling, West Virginia, the son of Albert Birdsall and Mary Edith (Davis) Riker. He graduated from high school in Moundsville, West Virginia, after which he worked for the Royal Three Barrel Gun Company, was an automobile repairman and salesman, and helped build greenhouses. He then attended Oberlin College, receiving in 1917 his A.B. degree in botany. He began graduate work in botany at the University of Cincinnati, but interrupted it during 1918–1919 to serve as a bacteriologist in Army hospital in France in World War I. After war's end, he completed his MA in 1920 in botany and bacteriology, and in 1922 his PhD in plant pathology from the University of Wisconsin where he studied crown gall, after which he joined the department. Except for 1926-1927, when he studied in London and Paris, Riker continued at Wisconsin until he retired in 1964.

Although Riker's interests encompassed many aspects of plant pathology, notably phytobacteriology, tissue culture, forest pathology, and epidemiology, his most significant contributions were in forestry, and in the later years of his career, in helping to organize international quarantines to restrict the spread of plant diseases. He received the American Men of Science Star in 1944, the Eighth International Botanical Congress Medal in 1954, and served as president of the American Phytopathological Society in 1947. He was a Fellow of the American Association for the Advancement of Science and of the American Academy of Microbiology, and elected to the National Academy of Sciences in 1951, serving as Chairman of its Section of Botany from 1959 to 1962. Riker married three times: Regina Stockhausen (1922), Helen Burgoyne (1953), and Adelaide Evenson, a retired microbiologist from the University of Arizona. He died in Tucson, Arizona.
