= Ti plasmid =

Circular plasmid used in creation of transgenic plants

The structure of the Ti plasmid

A tumour inducing (Ti) plasmid is a plasmid found in pathogenic species of Agrobacterium sensu lato, including A. tumefaciens, Rhizobium rhizogenes, A. rubi and Allorhizobium vitis.

Evolutionarily, the Ti plasmid is part of a family of plasmids carried by many species of Alphaproteobacteria. Members of this plasmid family are defined by the presence of a conserved DNA region known as the repABC gene cassette, which mediates the replication of the plasmid, the partitioning of the plasmid into daughter cells during cell division as well as the maintenance of the plasmid at low copy numbers in a cell. The Ti plasmids themselves are sorted into different categories based on the type of molecule, or opine, they allow the bacteria to break down as an energy source.

The presence of this Ti plasmid is essential for the bacteria to cause crown gall disease in plants. This is facilitated via certain crucial regions in the Ti plasmid, including the vir region, which encodes for virulence genes, and the transfer DNA (T-DNA) region, which is a section of the Ti plasmid that is transferred via conjugation into host plant cells after an injury site is sensed by the bacteria. These regions have features that allow the delivery of T-DNA into host plant cells, and can modify the host plant cell to cause the synthesis of molecules like plant hormones (e.g. auxins, cytokinins) and opines and the formation of crown gall tumours.

Because the T-DNA region of the Ti plasmid can be transferred from bacteria to plant cells, it represented an exciting avenue for the transfer of DNA between kingdoms and spurred large amounts of research on the Ti plasmid and its possible uses in bioengineering.

== Nomenclature and classification ==
The Ti plasmid is a member of the RepABC plasmid family found in Alphaproteobacteria. These plasmids are often relatively large in size, ranging from 100kbp to 2Mbp. They are also often termed replicons, as their replication begins at a single site. Members of this family have a characteristic repABC gene cassette. Another notable member of this family is the root inducing (Ri) plasmid carried by A. rhizogenes, which causes another plant disease known as hairy root disease.

A key feature of Ti plasmids is their ability to drive the production of opines, which are derivatives of various amino acids or sugar phosphates, in host plant cells. These opines can then be used as a nutrient for the infecting bacteria, which catabolizes the respective opines using genes encoded in the Ti plasmid.

Accordingly, Ti plasmids have been classified based on the type of opine they catabolize, namely: nopaline-, octopine- or mannityl-types, which are amino acid derivatives, or agrocinopine-type, which are sugar phosphate derivatives.

== Historical discovery ==
The identification of A. tumefaciens as the cause of gall tumours in plants paved the way for insights into the molecular basis of crown gall disease.

The first indication of a genetic effect on host plant cells came in 1942-1943, where plant cells of secondary tumours were found to lack any bacterial cells within. However, these tumour cells did possess the ability to produce opines metabolized by the infecting bacterial strain. Crucially, the production of the respective opines occurred regardless of the plant species and occasionally only within crown gall tissues, indicating that the bacteria had transferred some genetic material to the host plant cells in order to allow opine synthesis.

However, how and to what extent did DNA transfer occur remained an open question. Adding A. tumefaciens DNA alone did not cause tumors in plants, while very little A. tumefaciens DNA was found to be integrated into the host plant cell genome. The addition of deoxyribonucleases (DNases) to degrade DNA also failed to prevent the formation and growth of the plant tumors. These suggested that little, if any, of the A. tumefaciens DNA is transferred to the host plant cell to cause disease and, if DNA is indeed transferred from the bacteria to the plant, it must occur in a protected manner.

Subsequently, oncogenic bacterial strains were found to be able to convert non-pathogenic bacteria into pathogens via the process of conjugation, where the genes responsible for virulence were transferred to the non-pathogenic cells. The role of a plasmid in this pathogenic ability was further supported when large plasmids were found only in pathogenic bacteria but not avirulent bacteria. Eventually, the detection of parts of bacterial plasmids in host plant cells was established, confirming that this was the genetic material responsible for the genetic effect of infection.

With the identification of the Ti plasmid, many studies were carried out to determine the characteristics of the Ti plasmid and how the genetic material is transferred from the Agrobacterium to the plant host. Some notable early milestones in the studies of Ti plasmids include the mapping of a Ti plasmid in 1978 and the studying of sequence similarity between different Ti plasmids in 1981.

Between 1980–2000, the characterization of the T-DNA region and the 'vir' region was also pursued. Studies into the T-DNA region determined their process of transfer and identified genes allowing the synthesis of plant hormones and opines. Separately, early work aimed to determine the functions of the genes encoded in the 'vir' region - these were broadly categorized into those that allowed bacterial-host interactions and those that enabled T-DNA delivery.

== Replication, partitioning and maintenance ==
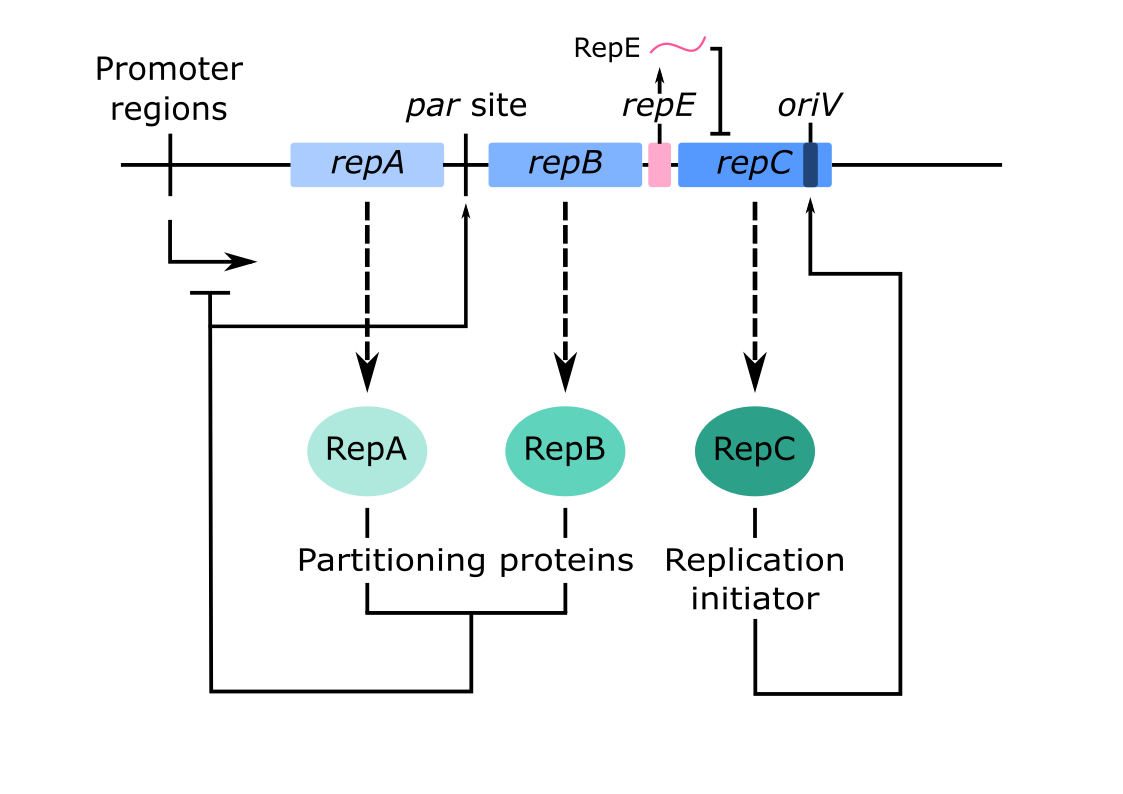
The repABC gene cassette of Ti plasmids in Agrobacteria, with a schematic of their gene product and activities

The replication, partitioning and maintenance of the Ti plasmid depends on the repABC gene cassette, which is mainly made up of three genes: repA, repB and repC. repA and repB each encode for proteins involved in plasmid partitioning, while repC encodes a replication initiator. These genes are expressed from 4 different promoters located upstream of repA. repE encodes for a small antisense RNA and is located between repB and repC. Additionally, there is a partitioning site (parS) and an origin of replication (oriV) present within the repABC cassette.

=== Replication of the Ti plasmid ===
The replication of the Ti plasmid is driven by the RepC initiator protein (P05684), which possesses two protein domains: an N-terminal domain (NTD) that binds to DNA and a C-terminal domain (CTD). Mutational analyses have shown that without a functional RepC protein, the Ti plasmid is unable to replicate. Meanwhile, the oriV sequence is around 150 nucleotides in length and is found within the repC gene. Laboratory experiments have shown that the RepC protein binds to this region, suggesting its role as the origin of replication. Therefore, while the complete process behind the replication of the Ti plasmid has not been fully described, the initial step of replication would likely depend on the expression of RepC and its binding to oriV. Of note, the RepC protein only acts in cis, where it only drives the replication of the plasmid it is encoded in and not any other plasmid also present in the bacterial cell.

=== Partitioning of the Ti plasmid ===
Components involved in the RepA/RepB partitioning system of Ti plasmids
Component	Function
RepA (ParA), P05682	A weak ATPase that negatively autoregulates the expression of the repABC cassette and can form filaments to aid in the partitioning of the plasmid during cell division
RepB (ParB), P05683	A DNA binding protein that serves as an adaptor between RepA and the parS site
parS	The palindromic binding site for the ParB protein; consensus GTTNNCNGCNGNNAAC

The partitioning system of the Ti plasmid is similar to the ParA/ParB system used in other plasmids and bacterial chromosomes and is thought to act in the same way. Mutations in either of the proteins RepA or RepB have resulted in a decrease in plasmid stability, indicating their role and importance in plasmid partitioning. The ability of RepA to form filaments allows it to create a physical bridge along which DNA can be pulled to opposite poles of a dividing cell. Meanwhile, the RepB protein can bind specifically to the parS sequence, forming a complex with DNA that can be recognized by RepA. This system is particularly important for the proper partitioning of the Ti plasmid, as the plasmid is only present in few copy numbers in the bacterial cell.

=== Maintenance of the Ti plasmid ===
The Ti plasmid is maintained at low copy numbers within a bacterial cell. This is partly achieved by influencing the expression of the replication initiator RepC. When bound to ADP, RepA is activated to work with RepB, acting as a negative regulator of the repABC cassette. The levels of RepC is therefore kept low within a cell, preventing too many rounds of replication from occurring during each cell division cycle. Furthermore, there is a small RNA known as RepE encoded between repB and repC that lowers the expression of repC. RepE is complementary to RepC and will bind with the repC mRNA to form a double-stranded molecule. This can then block the translational production of the RepC protein.

Separately, the expression of the repABC cassette and hence the copy number of the Ti plasmid is also influenced via a quorum sensing system in Agrobacterium. Quorum sensing systems respond to bacterial population densities by sensing a molecule, known as an autoinducer, that is produced by the bacterial cells at low levels and would build up to a threshold level when there is a high density of bacteria present. In this case, the autoinducer is the N-3-oxooctanoyl-L-homoserine lactone (3-O-C_{8}-AHL) molecule, which is sensed by a regulator known as TraR. When activated, TraR will bind to regions known as tra boxes in the repABC gene cassette's promoter regions to drive expression. Therefore, a high level of population density increases the number of plasmids present within each bacterial cell, likely to support pathogenesis in the plant host.

== Features ==
=== Virulence region ===
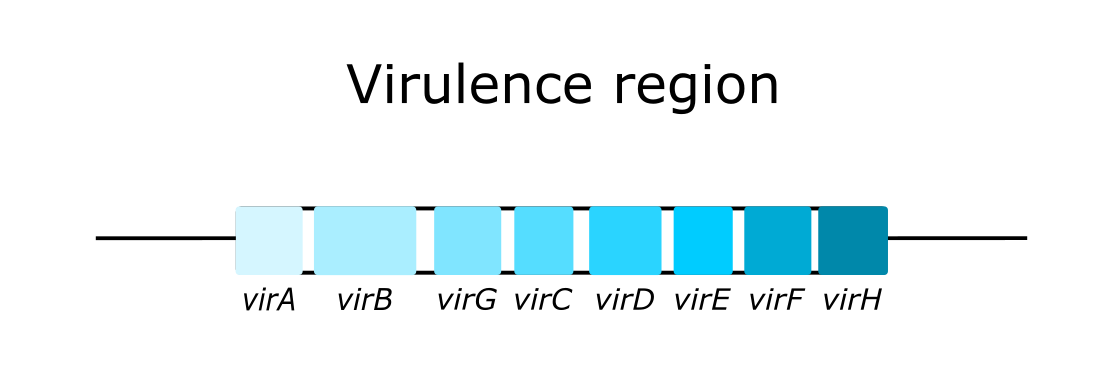
The composition of the vir region of octopine-type Ti plasmids

The expression of the vir region is usually repressed under normal conditions, and only becomes activated when the bacteria senses plant-derived signals from wound sites. This activation is necessary for the production of Vir proteins and the transfer of DNA and proteins into host plant cells.

VirA and VirG form a two-component regulatory system within Agrobacterium. This is a type of sensing and signalling system found commonly in bacteria; in this case, they act to sense plant-derived signals to drive the expression of the vir region. During the sensing, VirA, a histidine sensor kinase, will become phosphorylated before passing on this phosphate group to the response regulator VirG. The activated response regulator VirG can then bind to a region of DNA known as the vir box, located upstream of each vir promoter, to activate the expression of the vir region. One possible downstream functions of the sensing mediated by VirA and VirG is the directional movement, or chemotaxis, of the bacteria towards plant-derived signals; this allows the Agrobacterium to move towards the wound site in plants. Furthermore, with the induction of the vir region, the transfer of T-DNA can be mediated by the Vir proteins.

The virB operon is the largest operon in the vir region, encoding for 11 VirB proteins involved in the transfer process of T-DNA and bacterial proteins into host plant cells (see transfer apparatus below).

The virC operon encodes for two proteins: VirC1 and VirC2. These proteins influence the pathogenesis of the Agrobacterium towards different plant hosts, and mutations can reduce but not remove the virulence of the bacteria. Both the virC and virD operons can be repressed by a chromosomally encoded protein known as Ros. Ros binds to a region of DNA that overlaps with the binding site of the VirG regulator, and therefore competes with VirG to control their expression levels. Functionally, VirC1 and VirC2 promote the assembly of a relaxosome complex during the conjugative transfer of T-DNA from the bacteria to the host plant cell. This is an energy-dependent process mediated via their NTPase activity, and occurs as they bind to a region of DNA known as overdrive. As a result, they act to increase the amount of T-DNA strands produced. Following the production of the DNA strand to be transferred (transfer strand, T-strand), the VirC proteins can also help to direct the transfer strand to the transfer apparatus.

The virD operon encodes for 4 proteins: VirD1-D4. VirD1 and VirD2 are involved in the processing of T-DNA during conjugation to produce the T-strand; this is the single-stranded DNA molecule that is transported to the host plant cell (see transfer apparatus below). During the processing, VirD1 will act as a topoisomerase to unwind the DNA strands. VirD2, a relaxase, will then nick one of the DNA strands and remain bound to the DNA as it is transferred to the recipient cell. Within the recipient cell, VirD2 will also work together with VirE2 to direct the transferred DNA to the recipient cell's nucleus. There are suggestions that VirD2 may be phosphorylated and dephosphorylated by different proteins, affecting its ability to deliver DNA. Conversely, little is known about VirD3, and mutational analyses have not provided any support for its role in the virulence of Agrobacterium. Finally, VirD4 is a crucial part of the conjugation process, serving as a coupling factor that recognizes and transfers the T-strand to the transport channel.

The virE operon encodes for 2 proteins: VirE1 and VirE2. VirE2 is an effector protein translocated together with the T-strand into host plant cells. There, it binds to the T-strand to direct its delivery to the nucleus of the host plant cell. Part of this activity involves the presence of nuclear localization sequences within the protein, which marks the protein and the associated DNA for entry into the nucleus. It also protects the T-strand from nuclease attack. There is some speculation regarding the role of VirE2 as a protein channel, allowing DNA to move through the plant cytoplasmic membrane. On the other hand, VirE1 may be involved in promoting the transfer of the VirE2 protein into the host plant cell. It binds to the ssDNA-binding domain of VirE2, therefore preventing the VirE2 protein from prematurely binding to the T-strand within the bacterial cell.

virF is a host specificity factor found in some but not all types of Ti plasmids; for example, octopine-type Ti plasmids possess virF but nopaline-types do not. The ability of A. tumefaciens to induce crown gall tumours in certain plant species but not others has been attributed to the presence or absence of this virF gene.

The virH operon encodes for 2 proteins: VirH1 and VirH2. A bioinformatics study of the amino acid sequences of the VirH protein showed similarities between them and a superfamily of proteins known as cytochrome P450 enzymes. VirH2 was then discovered to metabolize certain phenolic compounds detected by VirA.

==== Transfer apparatus ====
Transfer apparatuses encoded within the Ti plasmid have to achieve two objectives: allow the conjugative transfer of the Ti plasmid between bacteria and allow the delivery of the T-DNA and certain effector proteins into host plant cells. These are achieved by the Tra/Trb system and the VirB/VirD4 system respectively, both members of the type IV secretion system (T4SS).

For the Ti plasmid and T-DNA to be transferred via conjugation, they must first be processed by different proteins, such as the relaxase enzyme (an enzyme that nicks DNA) TraA/VirD2 and the DNA transfer and replication (Dtr) proteins. traA and its Dtr recognize and bind to a region known as the origin of transfer (oriT) in the Ti plasmid to form the relaxosome, a protein complex for plasmid transfer. VirD2 and its Dtr instead recognize and create a nick at T-DNA's border sequence, and the nicked T-strand will be transported to the cell membrane, where the rest of the transfer machinery is present.

Within the VirB/VirD4 system, the VirD2 relaxase is aided by the accessory factors VirD1, VirC1 and VirC2 while it processes the DNA substrate. Furthermore, the VirD2 relaxase and the VirC proteins will contribute to the delivery of the DNA strand to the VirD4 receptor at the cell membrane. This receptor is an essential component of T4SSs, and is thought to energize and mediate the transfer of the DNA into the translocation channel between two cells.

The Tra/Trb and VirB/VirD4 systems are evolutionally related and each organized as an operon on the plasmid. The table below summarizes the proteins encoded in the operons that makes up the translocation channel of the two systems.

VirB	Tra	Trb	Function
VirB1	TraL	TrbN	Hydrolase, promotes conjugative pilus formation.
VirB2	TraM	TrbC	The major pilin subunit of the conjugative pilus.
VirB3	TraA	TrbD	Inner membrane (IM) protein that interacts with B4/traB/trbE.
VirB4	TraB	TrbE	ATPase that provide the energy for pilin dislocation. Is a possible channel subunit.
VirB5	TraC	TrbF	Part of pilus, specifically the tip adhesin.
VirB6	TraD	TrbL	Polytopic IM channel subunit.
VirB7	TraN	TrbH	Outer membrane (OM) lipoprotein, core subunit.
VirB8	TraE	(None)	Bitopic (both IM and OM) channel subunit.
VirB9	TraO	TrbG	OM-associated core subunit.
VirB10	TraF	TrbI	Bitopic: OM channel and core subunit.
VirB11	TraG	trbB	Channel ATPase that provides energy.

=== Transfer DNA (T-DNA) ===
The T-DNA of Agrobacterium is approximately 15-20 kbp in length and will become integrated into the host plant genome upon its transfer via a process known as recombination. This process utilizes preexisting gaps in the host plant cell's genome to allow the T-DNA to pair with short sequences in the genome, priming the process of DNA ligation, where the T-DNA is permanently joint to the plant genome. The T-DNA region is flanked at both ends by 24bp sequences.

Within the host plant cell's genome, the T-DNA of Agrobacterium is expressed to produce two main groups of proteins. One group is responsible for the production of plant growth hormones. As these hormones are produced, there will be an increase in the rate of cell division and therefore the formation of crown gall tumors. The second group of proteins are responsible for driving the synthesis of opines in the host plant cells. The specific opines produced depends on the type of the Ti plasmid but not on the plant host.

Some Ti plasmids contain not one, but two T-DNA pieces. This kind of setup is called T_{L}-DNA and T_{R}-DNA.

=== Opine utilization genes ===
The opines produced by the infected plant utilized by the plant host, and will instead be exported out of the plant cell where it can be taken up by the Agrobacterium cells. The bacteria possess genes in other regions of the Ti plasmid that allows the catabolism of opines. Each plasmid lineage has its own combination of opine utilization genes. Complexity of the mechanism range from three operons (noc, nox, acc) for nopaline and agrocinopine in nopaline-type plasmids to more than 40 genes for octopine, agropine, and mannopine in octopine-type plasmids.

== Uses in bioengineering ==
The ability of Agrobacterium to deliver DNA into plant cells opened new doors for plant genome engineering, allowing the production of genetically modified plants (transgenic plants). Proteins involved in mediating the transfer of T-DNA will first recognize the border sequences of the T-DNA region. Therefore, it is possible for scientists to use T-DNA border sequences to flank any desired sequence of interest - such a product can then be inserted into a plasmid and introduced into Agrobacterium cells. There, the border sequences will be recognized by the transfer apparatus of A. tumefaciens and delivered in a standard manner into the target plant cell. Moreover, by leaving behind only the border sequences of the T-DNA, the resulting product will edit the plant genome without causing any tumours in plants. This method has been used to modify several crop plants, including rice, barley and wheat. Further work have since extended the targets of A. tumefaciens to include fungi and human cell lines.

== Similar plasmids ==
Various RepABC plasmids form incompatibility groups. Plasmids of the same group usually cannot co-exist with one driving another to extinction. However, many nopaline-type Ti plasmids have the ability to fuse with incompatible plasmids. This makes these plasmids hard to "cure" (remove from the bacterium), a process often used in the lab to swap a Ti plasmid for another.

=== Root-inducing (Ri) plasmid ===
Ri plasmid is a descriptive term referring to Ti-like pathogenic plasmids that, instead of causing the crown gall disease, causes a hairy root disease. The classic example is the Ri plasmid of Rhizobium rhizogenes. The various Ri plasmids all carry a vir region, one or two T-DNA regions, and opine utilization genes. Granting them the root-forming capability are the rolA and rolB genes in the T-DNA. These genes enhance plant cell division through a non-hormonal method, unlike the Ti plasmid.

=== Symbiotic (sym) plasmids of Rhizobia ===
Some members of Rhizobia carry their nitrogen-fixing genes (nif) and nodulation genes (nod) on the chromosome, while others carry them on specialized symbiotic (sym) plasmids. Like Ti plasmids, the sym plasmids also use the repABC replacation, the TraI/TraR quorum sensing system, and contain a trb plasmid transfer system. A typical example is pNGR234a (536,165 bp; accession No. NC000914) from Sinorhizobium fredii NGR234. This dispensable plasmid carries no essential function. Opine catabolism is present on the bacterium's main chromosome, not the sym plasmid. The T4SS (VirB) is present on the megaplsmid instead of the sym plasmid.

== See also ==
- Mary-Dell Chilton
- Jeff Schell
- Marc Van Montagu
