= Agrobacterium albertimagni =

Scientific classification
- Domain: Bacteria
- Kingdom: Pseudomonadati
- Phylum: Pseudomonadota
- Class: Alphaproteobacteria
- Order: Hyphomicrobiales
- Family: Rhizobiaceae
- Genus: Agrobacterium
- Species: A. albertimagni

Binomial name
- Agrobacterium albertimagni Salmassi et al. 2002

Species of bacterium

Agrobacterium albertimagni is a species of arsenite-oxidizing bacterium.
