= Agrobacterium radiobacter =

Scientific classification
- Domain: Bacteria
- Kingdom: Pseudomonadati
- Phylum: Pseudomonadota
- Class: Alphaproteobacteria
- Order: Hyphomicrobiales
- Family: Rhizobiaceae
- Genus: Agrobacterium
- Species: A. radiobacter

Binomial name
- Agrobacterium radiobacter (Beijerinck and van Delden 1902) Conn 1942 (Approved Lists 1980)

Type strain
- ATCC 19358 (Note: also known as: CIP 104325; DSM 30147; HAMBI 1814; IAM 12048; ICMP 5785; IFO 13532; JCM 20371; LMG 140; NBRC 13532; NCCB 27005; NCIB 9042; NCIMB 9042; NCPPB 3001)

Synonyms
- "Bacillus radiobacter" Beijerinck and van Delden 1902; Beijerinckia fluminensis Döbereiner and Ruschel 1958 (Approved Lists 1980); Rhizobium radiobacter (Beijerinck and van Delden 1902) Young et al. 2001

Species of bacterium

Agrobacterium radiobacter is the type species of the genus Agrobacterium, a genus of Gram-negative bacteria that cause tumors in plants. It was incorrectly synonymized with Agrobacterium tumefaciens until 2022. This species is widely found in soil, in plant rhizospheres, and in human clinical specimens. Some members such as B6 harbor a tumor-inducing (Ti) plasmid and cause crown gall disease in plants. The type strain ATCC 19358 does not carry such a plasmid and is nonpathogenic.

The incorrect synonymization with A. tumefaciens was due to a strain B6 (ATCC 23308) being assigned as the type strain of A. tumefaciens in 1980, when B6 should be classified as A. radiobacter. One consequence is that this B6 strain is very well-studied in the lab. Another consequence is that research done on "A. tumefaciens" between 1980 and 2022 are possibly describing A. radiobacter instead. To determine the actual species, one should look up the 16S or genomic sequences of the strain used in the study.

== Notable former strains ==
Strain K84 produces agrocin 84, a type of bacteriocin, that inhibits the growth of Agrobacterium tumefaciens (possibly a misidentified A. radiobacter) which causes the disease. Strain K1026, which is descended from K84 by the removal of potentially-pathogenic DNA sequences, has been used as a biopesticide on stone fruit (such as cherries and plums), nut trees, and ornamentals to protect them from crown gall disease. Strain K84 and its descendant K1016 are now properly classified as belonging to Rhizobium rhizogenes.
