= D-nopaline dehydrogenase =

Identifiers
- EC no.: 1.5.1.19
- CAS no.: 64763-57-1

Databases
- BRENDA: enzyme data
- ExPASy: NiceZyme view
- KEGG: enzyme entry
- MetaCyc: metabolic pathway
- Rhea: reactions
- PDB structures: RCSB PDB PDBe PDBsum
- Gene Ontology: AmiGO / QuickGO
Search
- PMC: articles
- PubMed: articles
- NCBI: proteins

In enzymology, D-nopaline dehydrogenase (EC 1.5.1.19) is an enzyme that catalyzes the chemical reaction

Nopaline
+ NADP^{+}
H_{2}O
H^{+}
H_{2}O
H^{+}
Arginine
+ NADPH +
α-Ketoglutaric acid

The three substrates of this enzyme are nopaline, oxidised nicotinamide adenine dinucleotide phosphate (NADP^{+}), and water. Its products are L-arginine, reduced NADPH, α-ketoglutaric acid and a proton. Nopaline is a member of the class of compounds called opines.

This enzyme belongs to the family of oxidoreductases, specifically those acting on the CH-NH group of donors with NAD+ or NADP+ as acceptor. The systematic name of this enzyme class is N2-(D-1,3-dicarboxypropyl)-L-arginine:NADP+ oxidoreductase (L-arginine-forming). Other names in common use include D-nopaline synthase, nopaline dehydrogenase, nopaline synthase, NOS, 2-N-(D-1,3-dicarboxypropyl)-L-arginine:NADP+ oxidoreductase, and (L-arginine-forming). This enzyme participates in arginine and proline metabolism.
