= Photoassimilate =

In botany, a photoassimilate is one of a number of biological compounds formed by assimilation using light-dependent reactions. This term is most commonly used to refer to the energy-storing monosaccharides produced by photosynthesis in the leaves of plants.

Only NADPH, ATP and water are made in the "light" reactions. Monosaccharides, though generally more complex sugars, are made in the "dark" reactions. The term "light" reaction can be confusing as some "dark" reactions require light to be active.

Photoassimilate movement through plants from "source to sink" using xylem and phloem is of biological significance. This movement is mimicked by many infectious particles - namely viroids - to accomplish long ranged movement and consequently infection of an entire plant.
