= Opine dehydrogenase =

Identifiers
- EC no.: 1.5.1.28
- CAS no.: 108281-02-3

Databases
- BRENDA: enzyme data
- ExPASy: NiceZyme view
- KEGG: enzyme entry
- MetaCyc: metabolic pathway
- Rhea: reactions
- PDB structures: RCSB PDB PDBe PDBsum
- Gene Ontology: AmiGO / QuickGO
Search
- PMC: articles
- PubMed: articles
- NCBI: proteins

Opine dehydrogenase (EC 1.5.1.28) is an enzyme that catalyzes several chemical reactions involving a class of molecules called opines. An example is:

(1)
+ NAD^{+}
H_{2}O
H^{+}
H_{2}O
H^{+}
norvaline
+ NADH +
pyruvic acid

The three substrates of this enzyme are an opine such as (2S)-2-[(R)-1-carboxyethylamino]pentanoic acid (1), oxidised nicotinamide adenine dinucleotide (NAD^{+}), and water. When acting in the forward direction, the products in this example are L-norvaline, reduced NADH, pyruvic acid and a proton.

The enzyme can also catalyse reactions that make opines by adding a molecule of pyruvic acid or other keto acids to L-amino acids. This includes making derivatives of L-methionine, L-isoleucine, L-valine, and L-phenylalanine.
