= Nopaline =

- Stereo, skeletal formula of nopaline

Names
- IUPAC name (2R)-2-[[(1S)-1-Carboxy-4-(diaminomethylideneamino)butyl]amino]pentanedioic acid
- Other names N^{2}-(D-1,3-Dicarboxypropyl)-L-arginine

Identifiers
CAS Number	22350-70-5
3D model (JSmol)	Interactive image
ChEBI	CHEBI:17249
ChemSpider	19976727
KEGG	C01682
PubChem CID	108012
UNII	QJ8EP5F7X8
CompTox Dashboard (EPA)	DTXSID20945005
- InChI: InChI=1S/C11H20N4O6/c12-11(13)14-5-1-2-6(9(18)19)15-7(10(20)21)3-4-8(16)17/h6-7,15H,1-5H2,(H,16,17)(H,18,19)(H,20,21)(H4,12,13,14)/t6-,7+/m0/s1 Key: LMKYZBGVKHTLTN-NKWVEPMBSA-N
- SMILES: C(C[C@@H](C(=O)O)N[C@H](CCC(=O)O)C(=O)O)CN=C(N)N

Properties
Chemical formula	C_{11}H_{20}N_{4}O_{6}
Molar mass	304.303 g·mol^{−1}

Related compounds
Related opines	Octopine
- Except where otherwise noted, data are given for materials in their standard state (at 25 °C [77 °F], 100 kPa). Infobox references

Nopaline is a chemical compound derived from the amino acids glutamic acid and arginine. It is classified as an opine. Ti plasmids are classified on the basis of the different types of opines they produce. These may be nopaline plasmids, octopine plasmids and agropine plasmids. These opines are condensation products of amino acids and keto acids or may be derived from sugars. The opines are used as carbon and nitrogen sources and metabolized by Agrobacterium.

== Biosynthesis ==
The enzyme D-nopaline dehydrogenase, also called nopaline synthase, produces or degrades nopaline by catalyzing the chemical reaction

Nopaline
+ NADP^{+}
H_{2}O
H^{+}
H_{2}O
H^{+}
Arginine
+ NADPH +
α-Ketoglutaric acid

Nopaline is a combination of the amino acid L-arginine and α-ketoglutaric acid.
