= Georges Pelletier (doctor) =

Canadian doctor (1939–2022)

- Born: 1939
- Died: 16 January 2022 (aged 82); Quebec City, Quebec, Canada
- Education: Université Laval; McGill University; Albert Einstein College of Medicine
- Occupations: Doctor; Professor

Georges Pelletier (1939 – 16 January 2022) was a Canadian medical doctor, researcher, and academic. He was a professor at Université Laval and specialized in endocrinology. Pelletier died in Quebec City on 16 January 2022, at the age of 82.

== Distinctions ==
- Royal Society of Canada (1983)
- Doctorate honoris causa from the University of Rouen Normandy (1986)
- Honorary professor at the Norman Bethune University of Medical Sciences (1992)
- Médaille McLaughlin (1999)
- Professor emeritus of Université Laval (2011)

== Time at Université Laval ==
Georges Pelletier first gradudted from Université Laval in 1965 with a doctorate of medicine the again in 1996 with a doctorate of physiology. After three years furthering his education at different universities Pelletier returned to Laval in 1971 where he began work at the Centre hospitalier de l'Université Laval and became an assistant professor in the Faculty of Medicine. In 1974 Pelletier became an associate professor at Université Laval, then in 1979 he became a full professor. Pelletier continued working at Université Laval until 2010 when he retired at the age of 71 after 39 years of service.

While at Université Laval Georges Pelletier researched neuroendocrinology, with a focus on how neuropeptides impacted male and female reproduction.

== Publications ==
- Anesthetic drugs modulate feeding behavior and hypothalamic expression of the POMC polypeptide precursor and the NPY neuropeptide, 2018, co-authored with Besnier, Emmanuel & Clavier, Thomas & Tonon, Marie-Christine & Dureuil, Bernard & Castel, Helene & Compère, Vincent.
- Androgens in women are essentially made from DHEA in each peripheral tissue according to intracrinology, 2017, co-authored with Labrie, Fernand & Martel, Celine & Belanger, Alain
- Is vulvovaginal atrophy due to a lack of both estrogens and androgens? 2016, co-authored with Labrie, Fernand & Martel, Celine
