= D-octopine dehydrogenase =

Enzyme

Identifiers
- EC no.: 1.5.1.11
- CAS no.: 37256-27-2

Databases
- BRENDA: enzyme data
- ExPASy: NiceZyme view
- KEGG: enzyme entry
- MetaCyc: metabolic pathway
- Rhea: reactions
- PDB structures: RCSB PDB PDBe PDBsum
- Gene Ontology: AmiGO / QuickGO
Search
- PMC: articles
- PubMed: articles
- NCBI: proteins

Octopine dehydrogenase (N2-(D-1-carboxyethyl)-L-arginine:NAD+ oxidoreductase, OcDH, ODH) is a dehydrogenase enzyme in the opine dehydrogenase family that helps maintain redox balance under anaerobic conditions. It is found largely in aquatic invertebrates, especially mollusks, sipunculids, and coelenterates, and plays a role analogous to lactate dehydrogenase (found largely in vertebrates). In the presence of nicotinamide adenine dinucleotide (NADH), the enzyme catalyzes the reductive condensation of an α-keto acid with an amino acid to form N-carboxyalkyl-amino acids (called opines). The reaction reoxidizes glycolytically formed NADH to NAD+, replenishing this important cofactor used in glycolysis and allowing for the continued production of adenosine triphosphate in the absence of oxygen.

L-arginine + pyruvate + NADH + H^{+} $\rightleftharpoons$ D-octopine + NAD^{+} + H_{2}O

== Structure ==
OcDH is a monomer with a molecular weight of 38kD made of two functionally distinct subunits. The first, Domain I, is composed of 199 amino acids and contains a Rossmann fold. Domain II is composed of 204 amino acids and is connected to the Rossmann fold of Domain I via its N-terminus.

== Reaction and mechanism ==
The enzyme catalyses a chemical reaction which combines the amino acid, L-arginine, with pyruvic acid to form D-octopine:

arginine
+ NADH +
pyruvic acid
H^{+}
H_{2}O
H^{+}
H_{2}O
D-octopine
+ NAD^{+}

The reaction has the important effect of converting the cofactor, nicotinamide adenine dinucleotide in its reduced form, into its oxidised counterpart NAD^{+}.

Isothermal titration calorimetry (ITR), nuclear magnetic resonance (NMR) crystallography, and clonal studies of OcDH and its substrates have led to the identification of the enzyme reaction mechanism. First, the Rossmann fold in Domain I of OcDH binds NADH. Binding of NADH to the Rossmann fold triggers small conformational change typical in the binding of NADH to most dehydrogenases resulting in an interaction between the pyrophosphate moiety of NADH with residue Arg324 on Domain II. This interaction with Arg324 generates and stabilizes the L-arginine binding site and triggers partial domain closure (reduction in the distance between the two domains). The binding of the guanidinium headgroup of L-arginine to the active site of the OcDH:NADH complex (located between the domains) induces a rotational movement of Domain II towards Domain I (via a helix-kink-helix structure in Domain II). This conformational change forms the pyruvate binding site. Binding of pyruvate to the OcDH:NADH:L-arginine complex places the alpha-ketogroup of pyruvate in proximity with the alpha-amino group of L-arginine. The juxtaposition of these groups on the substrates results in the formation of a Schiff base which is subsequently reduced to D-octopine. The priming of the pyruvate site for hydride transfer via a Schiff base through the sequential binding of NADH and L-arginine to OcDH prevents the reduction of pyruvate to lactate.

=== Substrate specificity ===
Octopine dehydrogenase has at least two structural characteristics that contribute to substrate specificity. Upon binding to NADH, amino acid residues lining either side of the active site within the space between the domains of OcDH act as a "molecular ruler", physically limiting the size of the substrates that can fit into the active site. There is also a negatively charged pocket in the cleft between the two domains that acts an "electrostatic sink" that captures the positively charged side-chain of L-arginine.

== Evolution ==
Examination of OcDH reaction rates from different organisms in the presence of different substrates has demonstrated a trend of increasing specificity for substrates in animals of increasing complexity. Evolutionary modification in substrate specificity is seen most drastically in the amino acid substrate. OcDH from some sea anemones has been shown to be able to use non-guanidino amino acids whereas OcDH form more complex invertebrates, such as the cuttlefish, can only use L-arginine (a guanidino amino acid).
