= Octopine =

- Stereo, skeletal formula of octopine ((2S)-2-{[(1R)-1-carboxyethyl]amino})

Names
- IUPAC name 2-[[1-Carboxyethyl]amino]-5-(diaminomethylideneamino)pentanoic acid

Identifiers
CAS Number	34522-32-2
3D model (JSmol)	Interactive image
ChEBI	CHEBI:15805
ChemSpider	97253
KEGG	C04137
MeSH	octopine
PubChem CID	108172
CompTox Dashboard (EPA)	DTXSID70946103
- InChI: InChI=1S/C9H18N4O4/c1-5(7(14)15)13-6(8(16)17)3-2-4-12-9(10)11/h5-6,13H,2-4H2,1H3,(H,14,15)(H,16,17)(H4,10,11,12)/t5-,6+/m1/s1 Key: IMXSCCDUAFEIOE-RITPCOANSA-N
- SMILES: C[C@@H](N[C@@H](CCCNC(N)=N)C(O)=O)C(O)=O

Properties
Chemical formula	C_{9}H_{18}N_{4}O_{4}
Molar mass	246.267 g·mol^{−1}

Related compounds
Related alkanoic acids	Daminozide; Nopaline
Related compounds	Bis-tris propane; Pantetheine
- Except where otherwise noted, data are given for materials in their standard state (at 25 °C [77 °F], 100 kPa). Infobox references

Octopine is a derivative of the amino acids arginine and alanine. It was the first member of the class of chemical compounds known as opines to be discovered. Octopine gets its name from Octopus octopodia from which it was first isolated in 1927.

Octopine has been isolated from the muscle tissue of invertebrates such as octopus, Pecten maximus and Sipunculus nudus where it functions as an analog of lactic acid. Plants may also produce this compound after infection by Agrobacterium tumefaciens and transfer of the octopine synthesis gene from the bacterium to the plant.

== Biosynthesis ==
Octopine is formed by reductive condensation of the amino acid, L-arginine, with pyruvic acid through the action of the nicotinamide adenine dinucleotide-dependent enzyme octopine dehydrogenase. The reaction is reversible so that pyruvic acid and arginine can be regenerated. This has the important effect of regulating the amount of the cofactor available as NAD^{+}.

arginine
+ NADH +
pyruvic acid
H^{+}
H_{2}O
H^{+}
H_{2}O
D-octopine
+ NAD^{+}
