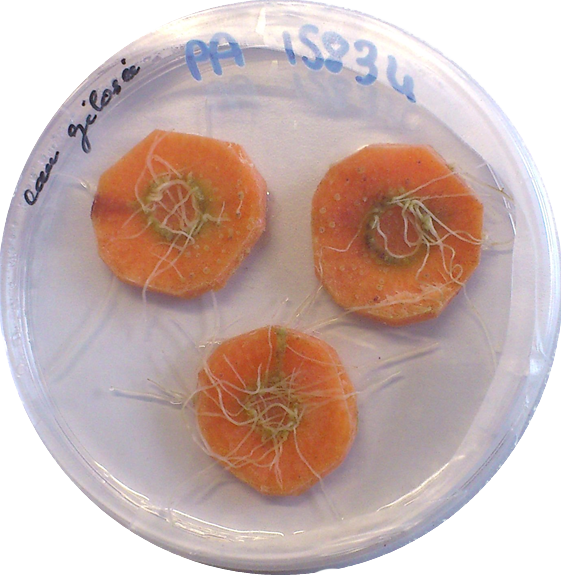

Scientific classification
- Domain: Bacteria
- Kingdom: Pseudomonadati
- Phylum: Pseudomonadota
- Class: Alphaproteobacteria
- Order: Hyphomicrobiales
- Family: Rhizobiaceae
- Genus: Rhizobium
- Species: R. rhizogenes

Binomial name
- Rhizobium rhizogenes (Riker et al. 1930) Young et al. 2001 (Note: The Young paper renames on the ground of a lumper view of Rhizobium that subsumes all of Agrobacterium, which also resolves much of the phylogenetic incoherences on the molecular level given 2001 data. GTDB agrees on this assignment of the type strain, and finds that it's still coherent even if Agrobacteirum is not subsumed. However, GTDB makes 4 extra species-level clusters containing genomes likely mislabelled as this species.)

Synonyms
- Agrobacterium rhizogenes (Riker et al. 1930) Conn 1942; Agrobacterium rhizogenes (Riker et al. 1930) Conn 1942 (Approved Lists 1980) emend. Sawada et al. 1993

= Rhizobium rhizogenes =

Disease-causing bacterium

Rhizobium rhizogenes (formerly Agrobacterium rhizogenes) is a Gram-negative soil bacterium that produces hairy root disease in dicotyledonous plants. R. rhizogenes induces the formation of proliferative multiple-branched adventitious roots at the site of infection, so-called 'hairy roots'. It also induces galls.

In the rhizosphere, plants may suffer from wounds by soil pathogens or other sources. This leads to the secretion of phenolic compounds like acetosyringone which have chemotactic effects that attract the bacteria. Under such conditions, certain bacterial genes are turned on leading to the transfer of its T-DNA from its root-inducing plasmid (Ri plasmid) into the plant through the wound. After integration and expression, in vitro or under natural conditions, the hairy root phenotype is observed, which typically includes overdevelopment of a root system that is not completely geotropic, and altered (wrinkled) leaf morphology, if leaves are present. R. rhizogenes also propagates as a seed-borne pathogen.

== Role in plant evolution ==
Rhizobium rhizogenes genes may be retained within the plant germ line and transmitted to descendants.

- 15 species in the tobacco genus Nicotiana harbor and express at least one of the T-DNA genes rolB, rolC, ORF13, and ORF14. Sequence comparison suggests that these T-DNA parts originated in an integrated event in a shared ancestor of these species. Because the genes are so widely kept with high expression, it is likely that they confer some useful function to the plant.
- The sweet potato has retained and actively expresses R. rhizogenes genes which are not present in other members of its genus. It is possible that the T-DNA has imparted useful traits that humans later selected for.

== Applications ==
=== Plant culture ===
The hairy roots are grown in vitro in bioreactors to study their soil interaction with other pathogens like fungi and nematodes.

Hairy root cultures also enable the commercial production of certain secondary metabolic compounds that the plant is known to secrete, especially in regard to the medicinal plants that are difficult to cultivate in sufficient quantities by other means. For example, hairy root cultures of ginseng have been used to speed up the discovery of drugs based on ginseng phytochemicals.

Root cultures can also be used to regenerate entire plants that are transformed, i.e. carry DNA from Rhizobium rhizogenes. This may be the natural T-DNA, a man-made sequence designed for genetic engineering, or both. Genetic engineering allows in-depth study of genetic processes that lead to plant traits such as nodulation as well as production of useful cultivars.

=== Bioprevention ===
Strain K84 produces agrocin 84, a type of bacteriocin, that inhibits the growth of Agrobacterium tumefaciens (possibly a misclassified A. radiobacter) which causes the disease. Strain K1026, which is descended from K84 by the removal of potentially-pathogenic DNA sequences, has been used as a biopesticide on stone fruit (such as cherries and plums), nut trees, and ornamentals to protect them from crown gall disease. Strain K84 and its descendant K1016 are now properly classified as belonging to Rhizobium rhizogenes. They were formerly considered A. radiobacter.
