= Transfer DNA =

Type of DNA in bacterial genomes

Ti plasmid with tDNA region

The transfer DNA (abbreviated T-DNA) is the transferred DNA of the tumor-inducing (Ti)/root-inducing (Ri) plasmid of plant-pathogenic bacteria such as Agrobacterium tumefaciens, Rhizobium rhizogenes, and Allorhizobium vitis (all loosely considered to be Agrobacterium). The T-DNA is transferred from bacterium into the host plant's nuclear DNA genome. The capability of this specialized tumor-inducing (Ti) plasmid is attributed to two essential regions required for DNA transfer to the host cell. The T-DNA is bordered by 25-base-pair repeats on each end. Transfer is initiated at the right border and terminated at the left border. Transfer requires the vir genes of the Ti plasmid, which are not transferred to the plant.

The A. fabrum C58 T-DNA is about 24,000 base pairs long and contains plant-expressed genes that code for enzymes synthesizing opines and phytohormones. By transferring the T-DNA into the plant genome, the bacterium essentially reprograms the plant cells to grow into a tumor and produce a unique food source for the bacteria. The synthesis of the plant hormones auxin and cytokinin by enzymes encoded in the T-DNA enables the plant cell to overgrow, thus forming the crown gall tumors typically induced by Agrobacterium infection. The opines are amino acid derivatives used by the bacterium as a source of carbon and energy, with the utilization genes located on parts of the plasmid not transferred to the plant. Rhizobium rhizogenes causes a similar infection known as hairy root disease. It has similar opine synthesis genes but different overgrowth-causing genes.

This natural process of horizontal gene transfer in plants is being utilized as a tool for fundamental and applied research in plant biology through Agrobacterium-mediated foreign gene transformation and insertional mutagenesis. Plant genomes can be engineered by use of Agrobacterium for the delivery of sequences hosted in T-DNA binary vectors, which separate the vir genes from the T-DNA.

Some Ti/Ri plasmids have not one, but two pieces of T-DNAs bordered by repeats. Both are transferred to the plant. This kind of setup is called T_{L}-DNA and T_{R}-DNA.

== Mechanism of transformation in nature ==
The infection process of T-DNA into the host cell and integration into its nucleus involve multiple steps. First, the bacteria multiply in the wound sap before infection and then attach to the plant cell walls. The bacterial virulence genes' expression of approximately 10 operons is activated by perception of phenolic compounds such as acetosyringone emitted by wounded plant tissue and follows cell-cell contact. Then this process proceeds with the macromolecular translocation from Agrobacterium to cytoplasm of host cell, transmission of T-DNA along with associated proteins (called T-complex) to the host cell nucleus followed by disassembly of the T-complex, stable integration of T-DNA into host plant genome, and eventual expression of the transferred genes. The integration of T-DNA into a host genome involves the formation of a single-stranded nick in the DNA at the right border of the Ti plasmid. This nick creates a region of single stranded DNA from the left border of the T-DNA gene over to the right border which was cut. Then, single stranded binding proteins attach to the single stranded DNA. DNA synthesis displaces the single stranded region and then a second nick at the left border region releases the single stranded T-DNA fragment. Further this fragment can be incorporated into a host genome.

Agrobacterium has been known to evolve a control system that uses plant host factors and cellular processes for several pathways of host-plant defense response to invade the host cell nucleus. For the integration of T-DNA into the target host genome, Agrobacterium carries out multiple interactions with host-plant factors. To interact with host plant proteins many Agrobacterium virulence proteins encoded by vir genes. Agrobacterium vir gene expression occurs via the VirA-VirG sensor that results in generation of a mobile single-stranded T-DNA copy (T-strand). A processed form of VirB2 is the major component of the T-complex that is required for transformation. VirD2 is the protein that caps the 5′ end of the transferred T-strand by covalent attachment and is transported to the host cell cytoplasm. VirE2 is the single-stranded DNA binding protein that presumably coats the T- strand in the host cytoplasm by cooperative binding. It is then directed into the nucleus via interactions with the host cell proteins such as importin a, bacterial VirE3, and dynein-like proteins. Several other bacterial virulence effectors like VirB5, VirB7 (the minor components of the T-complex), VirD5, VirE2, VirE3, and VirF that may also interact with proteins of host plant cells.

== Uses in biotechnology ==
Agrobacterium-mediated T-DNA transfer is widely used as a tool in biotechnology. For more than two decades, Agrobacterium tumefaciens has been exploited for introducing genes into plants for basic research as well as for commercial production of transgenic crops. In genetic engineering, the tumor-promoting and opine-synthesis genes are removed from the T-DNA and replaced with a gene of interest and/or a selection marker, which is required to establish which plants have been successfully transformed. Examples of selection markers include neomycin phosphotransferase, hygromycin B phosphotransferase (which both phosphorylate antibiotics) and phosphinothricin acetyltransferase (which acetylates and deactivates phosphinothricin, a potent inhibitor of glutamine synthetase) or a herbicide formulations such as Basta or Bialophos. Another selection system that can be employed is usage of metabolic markers such as phospho-mannose isomerase. Agrobacterium is then used as a vector to transfer the engineered T-DNA into the plant cells where it integrates into the plant genome. This method can be used to generate transgenic plants carrying a foreign gene. Agrobacterium tumefaciens is capable of transferring foreign DNA to both monocotyledons and dicotyledonous plants efficiently while taking care of critically important factors like the genotype of plants, types and ages of tissues inoculated, kind of vectors, strains of Agrobacterium, selection marker genes and selective agents, and various conditions of tissue culture.

The same procedure of T-DNA transfer can be used to disrupt genes via insertional mutagenesis. Not only does the inserted T-DNA sequence create a mutation but its insertion also 'tags' the affected gene, thus allowing for its isolation as T-DNA flanking sequences. A reporter gene can be linked to the right end of the T-DNA to be transformed along with a plasmid replicon and a selectable antibiotic (such as hygromycin)-resistance gene and can explicit approximately 30% of average efficiency having successful T-DNA inserts induced gene fusions in Arabidopsis thaliana.

Reverse genetics involves testing the presumed function of a gene that is known by disrupting it and then looking for the effect of that induced mutation on the organismal phenotype. T-DNA tagging mutagenesis involves screening of populations by T-DNA insertional mutations. Collections of known T-DNA mutations provide resources to study the functions of individual genes, as developed for the model plant Arabidopsis thaliana. Examples of T-DNA insertion mutations in Arabidopsis thaliana include those associated many classes of phenotypes including seedling-lethals, size variants, pigment variants, embryo-defectives, reduced-fertility, and morphologically or physiologically aberrant plants.

== See also ==
- Transfer DNA binary system
