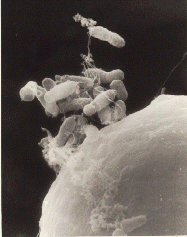

Scientific classification
- Domain: Bacteria
- Kingdom: Pseudomonadati
- Phylum: Pseudomonadota
- Class: Alphaproteobacteria
- Order: Hyphomicrobiales
- Family: Rhizobiaceae
- Genus: Agrobacterium; Conn 1942 (Approved Lists 1980)

Type species
- Agrobacterium radiobacter (Smith and Townsend 1907) Conn 1942 (Approved Lists 1980)

Species
- "Agrobacterium albertimagni" Salmassi et al. 2002; Agrobacterium arsenijevicii Kuzmanović et al. 2019; "Agrobacterium bohemicum" Zahradnik et al. 2018; Agrobacterium cavarae Flores-Félix et al. 2020; "Agrobacterium deltaense" Yan et al. 2017; Agrobacterium fabacearum Delamuta et al. 2020; "Agrobacterium fabrum" Lassalle et al. 2011; Agrobacterium larrymoorei Bouzar and Jones 2001; Agrobacterium nepotum (Puławska et al. 2012) Mousavi et al. 2016; Agrobacterium pusense (Panday et al. 2011) Mousavi et al. 2016; Agrobacterium radiobacter (Beijerinck and van Delden 1902) Conn 1942 (Approved Lists 1980); Agrobacterium rosae Kuzmanović et al. 2019; Agrobacterium rubi (Hildebrand 1940) Starr and Weiss 1943; Agrobacterium salinitolerans Yan et al. 2017; Agrobacterium skierniewicense (Puławska et al. 2012) Mousavi et al. 2016; Agrobacterium tumefaciens

Synonyms
- Polymonas Lieske 1928

= Agrobacterium =

Genus of bacteria

Agrobacterium is a genus of Gram-negative bacteria established by H. J. Conn that uses horizontal gene transfer to cause tumors in plants. Agrobacterium tumefaciens is the most commonly studied species in this genus. Agrobacterium is well known for its ability to transfer DNA between itself and plants, and for this reason it has become an important tool for genetic engineering.

== Nomenclatural history ==
Leading up to the 1990s, the genus Agrobacterium was used as a wastebasket taxon. With the advent of 16S sequencing, many Agrobacterium species (especially the marine species) were reassigned to genera such as Ahrensia, Pseudorhodobacter, Ruegeria, and Stappia. The remaining Agrobacterium species were assigned to three biovars: biovar 1 (Agrobacterium tumefaciens), biovar 2 (Agrobacterium rhizogenes), and biovar 3 (Agrobacterium vitis). In the early 2000s, Agrobacterium was synonymized with the genus Rhizobium. This move proved to be controversial. The debate was finally resolved when the genus Agrobacterium was reinstated after it was demonstrated that it was phylogenetically distinct from Rhizobium and that Agrobacterium species were unified by a unique synapomorphy: the presence of the protelomerase gene, telA, which causes all members of the genus to have a linear chromid. By this time, however, the three Agrobacterium biovars had become defunct; biovar 1 remained with Agrobacterium, biovar 2 was renamed Rhizobium rhizogenes, and biovar 3 was renamed Allorhizobium vitis.

What remains in Agrobacterium (the Agrobacterium tumefaciens species complex) has suffered from some residual nomenclatural confusion. The current species-level clusters (genomospecies, genomovar) and names are:

Genomic species of Agrobacterium sensu stricto
Gsp.	Name(s)	Representative strain	Notes
G1	A. tumefaciens	ATCC 4720^{T} (A1)	Was incorrectly synonymized with A. radiobacter due to an unjustified type strain change to B6.
G1	A. fabacearum	CNPSo 675	A. tumefaciens and A. fabacearum are not different enough to justify separate species per ANI, but they are distinguishable by MLSA and RecA.
G2	A. pusense	NCIMB 14639^{T} (NRCPB10)	
G3		S2	
G4	A. radiobacter	ATCC 19358^{T}; ATCC 23308 (B6)	
G6		CFBP5499	
G7	A. deltae	LMG 29283^{T}, YIC 4121	Distinguishable by MLSA.
G7	A. leguminum	LMG 31779^{T} (MOPV5)	Distinguishable by MLSA.
G8	A. fabrum	C58^{T}	Very commonly used in the lab under the misidentifications A. radiobacter and A. tumefaciens.
G9	A. salinitolerans	LMG 29287^{T}	
G11	A. rubi	ATCC 13335^{T} (TR3)	Not in the species complex, but in the distinct A. rosae/rubi/vaccini/bohemicum/larrymoorei group.
G13		CFBP 6624	
G14	A. nepotum	39/7^{T}	Also (mis)classified under Rhizobium.
G19	A. burrii	CFBP 8705^{T}, Rnr	
G20	A. shirazense	CFBP 8901^{T} (OT33)	
G21		6N2	
G22		GD03642	
	A. cucumeris	O132^{T}	Part of the A. tumefaciens species complex, but has no genomospecies designation.
	A. larrymoorei	ATCC 51759^{T}	Spans four RecA/MLSA distinguishable clusters.
	A. rosae	NCPPB 1650^{T}	
	A. bohemicum	R90^{T}	
	A. skierniewicense	DSM 26438^{T} (Ch11)	Also (mis)classified under Rhizobium.
	A. vaccinii	B7.6^{T}	
	A. cavarae	RZME10	

== Plant pathogen ==
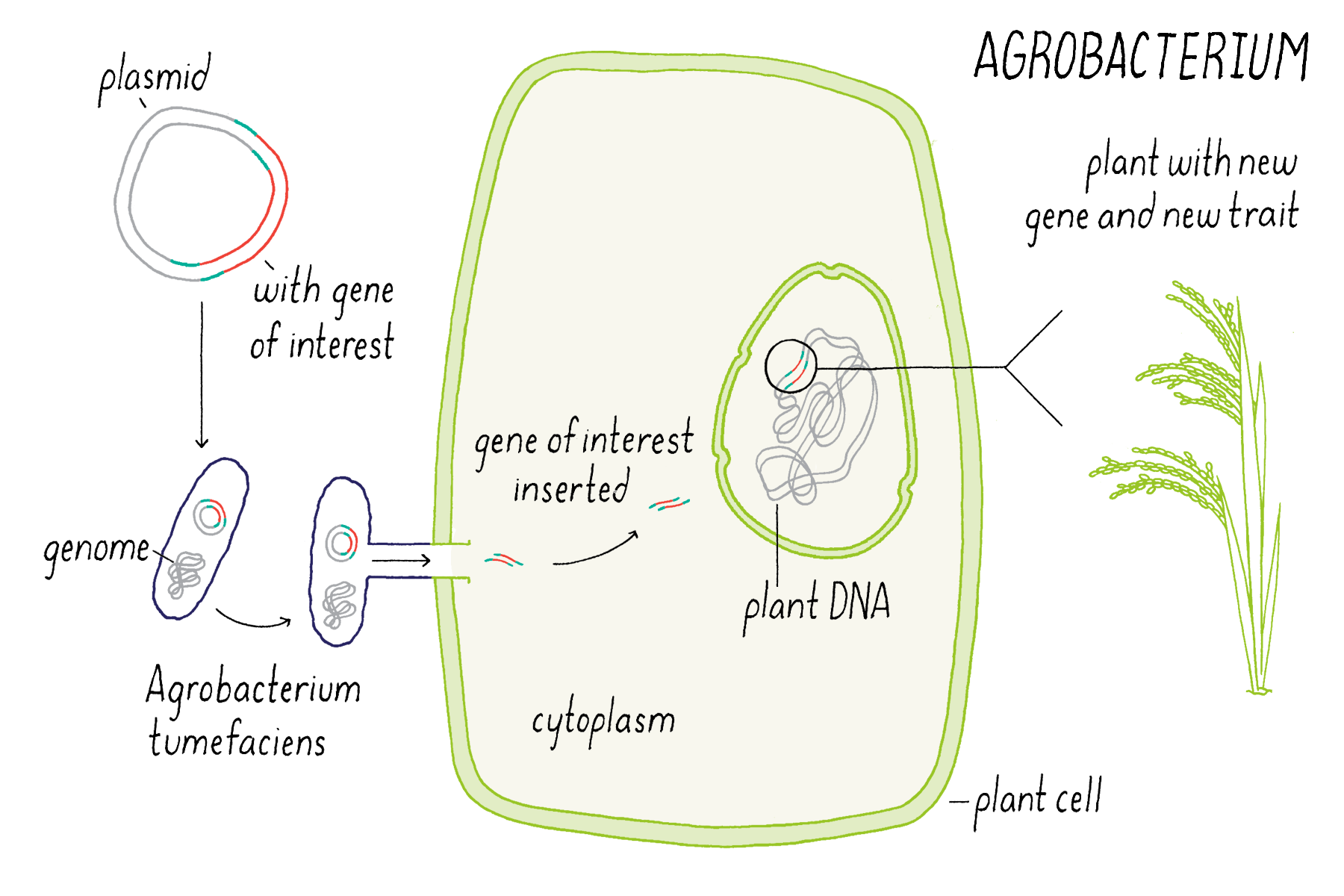
A species of bacteria that is a pathogen of plants. This bacterium has been modified so that it no longer harms the plant and can be used to introduce foreign genes into plants for genetic engineering.

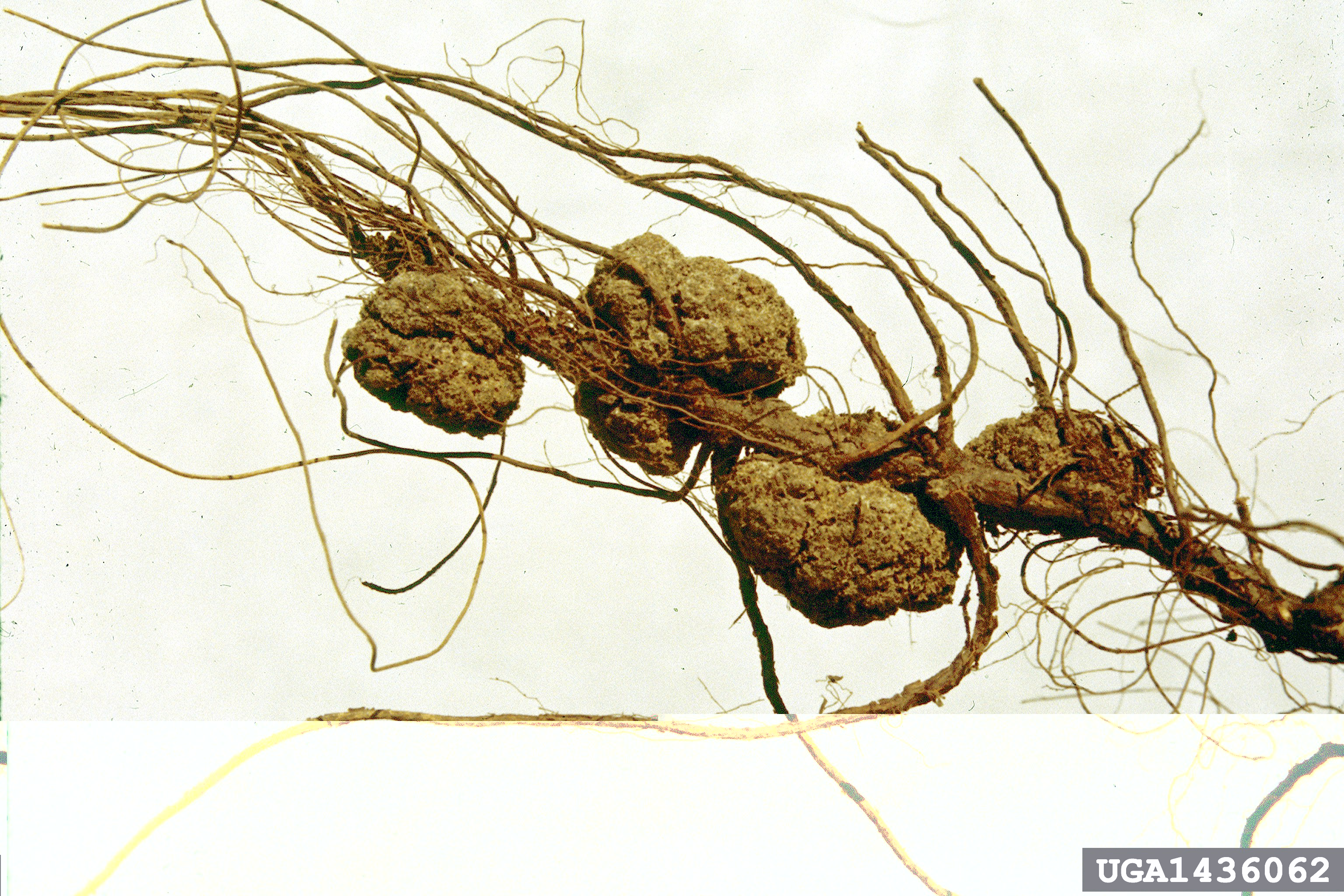
The large growths on these roots are galls induced by Agrobacterium sp.

Agrobacterium tumefaciens causes crown-gall disease in plants. The disease is characterised by a tumour-like growth or gall on the infected plant, often at the junction between the root and the shoot. Tumors are incited by the conjugative transfer of a DNA segment (T-DNA) from the bacterial tumour-inducing (Ti) plasmid. The closely related species, Agrobacterium rhizogenes, induces root tumors, and carries the distinct Ri (root-inducing) plasmid. Although the taxonomy of Agrobacterium is currently under revision it can be generalised that 3 biovars exist within the genus, Agrobacterium tumefaciens, Agrobacterium rhizogenes, and Agrobacterium vitis. Strains within Agrobacterium tumefaciens and Agrobacterium rhizogenes are known to be able to harbour either a Ti or Ri-plasmid, whilst strains of Agrobacterium vitis, generally restricted to grapevines, can harbour a Ti-plasmid. Non-Agrobacterium strains have been isolated from environmental samples which harbour a Ri-plasmid whilst laboratory studies have shown that non-Agrobacterium strains can also harbour a Ti-plasmid. Some environmental strains of Agrobacterium possess neither a Ti nor Ri-plasmid. These strains are avirulent.

The plasmid T-DNA is integrated semi-randomly into the genome of the host cell, and the tumor morphology genes on the T-DNA are expressed, causing the formation of a gall. The T-DNA carries genes for the biosynthetic enzymes for the production of unusual amino acids, typically octopine or nopaline. It also carries genes for the biosynthesis of the plant hormones, auxin and cytokinins, and for the biosynthesis of opines, providing a carbon and nitrogen source for the bacteria that most other micro-organisms can't use, giving Agrobacterium a selective advantage. By altering the hormone balance in the plant cell, the division of those cells cannot be controlled by the plant, and tumors form. The ratio of auxin to cytokinin produced by the tumor genes determines the morphology of the tumor (root-like, disorganized or shoot-like).

== In humans ==
Although generally seen as an infection in plants, Agrobacterium can be responsible for opportunistic infections in humans with weakened immune systems, but has not been shown to be a primary pathogen in otherwise healthy individuals. One of the earliest associations of human disease caused by Agrobacterium radiobacter was reported by Dr. J. R. Cain in Scotland (1988). A later study suggested that Agrobacterium attaches to and genetically transforms several types of human cells by integrating its T-DNA into the human cell genome. The study was conducted using cultured human tissue and did not draw any conclusions regarding related biological activity in nature.

== Uses in biotechnology ==
=== Gene transfer ===
The ability of Agrobacterium to transfer genes to plants and fungi is used in biotechnology, in particular, genetic engineering for plant improvement. Genomes of plants and fungi can be engineered by use of Agrobacterium for the delivery of sequences hosted in T-DNA binary vectors. A modified Ti or Ri plasmid can be used. The plasmid is 'disarmed' by deletion of the tumor inducing genes; the only essential parts of the T-DNA are its two small (25 base pair) border repeats, at least one of which is needed for plant transformation. The genes to be introduced into the plant are cloned into a plant binary vector that contains the T-DNA region of the disarmed plasmid, together with a selectable marker (such as antibiotic resistance) to enable selection for plants that have been successfully transformed. Plants are grown on media containing antibiotic following transformation, and those that do not have the T-DNA integrated into their genome will die. An alternative method is agroinfiltration.

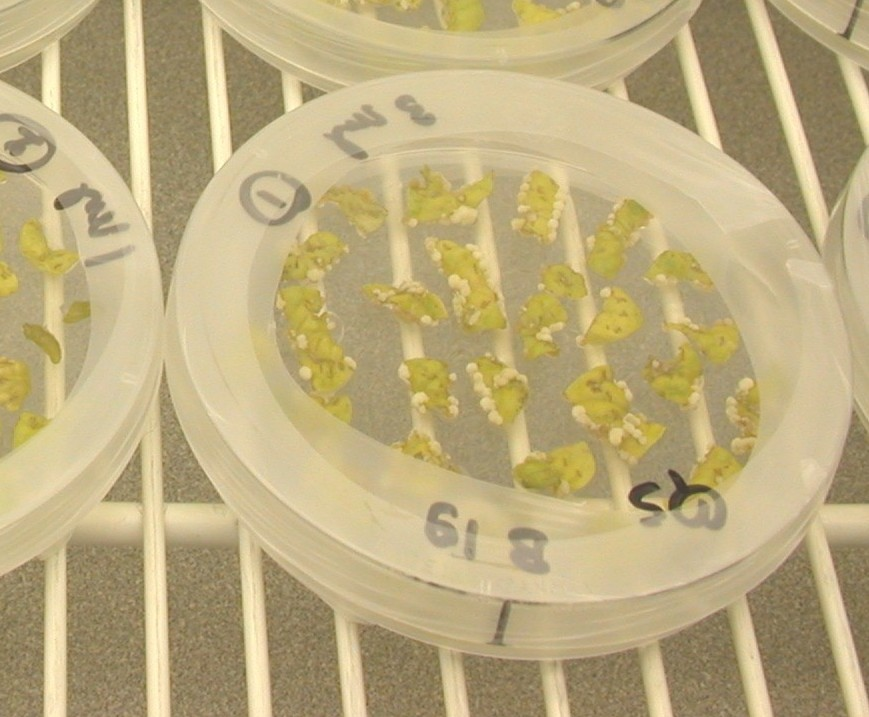
Plant (S. chacoense) transformed using Agrobacterium. Transformed cells start forming calluses on the side of the leaf pieces

Transformation with Agrobacterium can be achieved in multiple ways. Protoplasts or alternatively leaf-discs can be incubated with the Agrobacterium and whole plants regenerated using plant tissue culture. In agroinfiltration the Agrobacterium may be injected directly into the leaf tissue of a plant. This method transforms only cells in immediate contact with the bacteria, and results in transient expression of plasmid DNA.

Agroinfiltration is commonly used to transform tobacco (Nicotiana). A common transformation protocol for Arabidopsis is the floral dip method: An inflorescence is dipped in a suspension of Agrobacterium, and the bacterium transforms the germline cells that make the female gametes. The seeds can then be screened for antibiotic resistance (or another marker of interest). Plants that have not integrated the plasmid DNA will die when exposed to the antibiotic.

Agrobacterium is listed as being the vector of genetic material that was transferred to these USA GMOs:

- Soybean
- Cotton
- Maize
- Sugar Beet
- Alfalfa
- Wheat
- Rapeseed Oil (Canola)
- Creeping bentgrass (for animal feed)
- Rice (Golden Rice)

The transformation of fungi using Agrobacterium is used primarily for research purposes, and follows similar approaches as for plant transformation. The Ti plasmid system is modified to include DNA elements to select for transformed fungal strains, after co-incubation of Agrobacterium strains carrying these plasmids with fungal species.

=== Polysacchides ===
Rhizobaceae bacteria including Agrobacterium produce polysacchides. The wild type of A. fabrum produces three different polysacchides: a periplasmic cyclic (1→2)-β-D-glucan, an extracellular acidic heteroglycan (succinoglycan), and an extracellular, neutral, linear (1→3)-β-glucan (curdlan). A spontaneous mutation in the lab produced a strain (10C3K) that makes no succinoglycan and efficiently makes curdlan. Curdlan is a non-toxic polysacchide that gels under heat. It is used in the food and pharmaceutical industries.

== Genomics ==
The Agrobacterium genome consists of three parts: a circular chromosome, a linear chromosome/chromid, and (in some species) a Ti plasmid.

The sequencing of the genomes of several species of Agrobacterium has permitted the study of the evolutionary history of these organisms and has provided information on the genes and systems involved in pathogenesis, biological control and symbiosis. One important finding is the possibility that chromosomes are evolving from plasmids in many of these bacteria. Another discovery is that the diverse chromosomal structures in this group appear to be capable of supporting both symbiotic and pathogenic lifestyles. The availability of the genome sequences of Agrobacterium species will continue to increase, resulting in substantial insights into the function and evolutionary history of this group of plant-associated microbes.

== History ==
Marc Van Montagu and Jozef Schell at the University of Ghent (Belgium) discovered the gene transfer mechanism between Agrobacterium and plants, which resulted in the development of methods to alter Agrobacterium into an efficient delivery system for gene engineering in plants. A team of researchers led by Mary-Dell Chilton were the first to demonstrate that the virulence genes could be removed without adversely affecting the ability of Agrobacterium to insert its own DNA into the plant genome (1983).

== See also ==
- Agroinfiltration
- Marc Van Montagu
- Rhizobium rhizogenes (formerly Agrobacterium rhizogenes)
