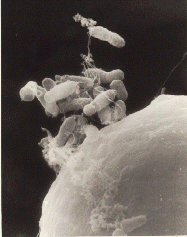
- Agrobacterium tumefaciens attaching itself to a carrot cell

Scientific classification
- Domain: Bacteria
- Kingdom: Pseudomonadati
- Phylum: Pseudomonadota
- Class: Alphaproteobacteria
- Order: Hyphomicrobiales
- Family: Rhizobiaceae
- Genus: Agrobacterium
- Species: A. tumefaciens

Binomial name
- Agrobacterium tumefaciens (Smith and Townsend 1907) Conn 1942 (Approved Lists 1980)

Type strain
- ATCC 4720 (Note: also known as: CCM:1000, CCUG:3555, CFBP:2412, CIP:104335, DSM:30150, ICMP:5793, BCCM/LMG:182, NCIMB:8150, NCPPB:2992, IAM:14141, IAM:1524, JCM:21034, personal::A1)

Synonyms
- Homotypic synonyms: Bacterium tumefaciens Smith and Townsend 1907; Pseudomonas tumefaciens (Smith and Townsend 1907) Duggar 1909; Phytomonas tumefaciens (Smith and Townsend 1907) Bergey et al. 1923; Polymonas tumefaciens (Smith and Townsend 1900) Lieske 1928; Heterotypic synonyms: Agrobacterium fabacearum Delamuta et al 2020 (by ANI); Agrobacterium radiobacter (Beijerinck and van Delden 1902) Conn 1942 (Approved Lists 1980) = Rhizobium radiobacter is NOT a synonym. The two used to be synonimized on the basis of an unjustified type strain change in the Approved Lists of 1980, reverted in 2023.

= Agrobacterium tumefaciens =

Bacterium, genetic engineering tool

Agrobacterium tumefaciens is the causal agent of crown gall disease (the formation of tumours) in over 140 species of eudicots. It is a rod-shaped, Gram-negative soil bacterium. Symptoms are caused by the insertion of a small segment of DNA (known as T-DNA, for 'transfer DNA', not to be confused with tRNA that transfers amino acids during protein synthesis), from a plasmid into the plant cell, which is incorporated at a semi-random location into the plant genome. Plant genomes can be engineered by use of Agrobacterium for the delivery of sequences hosted in T-DNA binary vectors.

Agrobacterium tumefaciens is an Alphaproteobacterium of the family Rhizobiaceae, which includes the nitrogen-fixing legume symbionts. Unlike the nitrogen-fixing symbionts, tumor-producing Agrobacterium species are pathogenic and do not benefit the plant. The wide variety of plants affected by Agrobacterium makes it of great concern to the agriculture industry.

Economically, A. tumefaciens is a serious pathogen of walnuts, grape vines, stone fruits, nut trees, sugar beets, horseradish, and rhubarb, and the persistent nature of the tumors or galls caused by the disease make it particularly harmful for perennial crops.

Agrobacterium tumefaciens grows optimally at 28 °C (82 °F). The doubling time can range from 2.5–4h depending on the media, culture format, and level of aeration. At temperatures above 30 °C (86 °F), A. tumefaciens begins to experience heat shock which is likely to result in errors in cell division.

== Taxonomy and scope ==
The classification of Agrobacterium tumefaciens and related species, collectively the Agrobacterium tumefaciens species complex, has greatly outpaced the change in terminology employed by plant scientists.

Before 1980 the division of Agrobacterium largely reflected disease symptomology and host range. A. radiobacter is defined as the "avirulent" species, A. tumefaciens the one causing crown gall, A. rhizogenes causing hairy root disease, and A. rubi causing cane gall.

With the discovery of the Ti plasmid it was realized that symptomology mostly depend on the particular version of the plasmid carried, not anything that resembles a biological species concept. By 2000, the "biovar" concept, using growth and metabolic characteristics, had divided Agrobacterium into three biovars later shown to be mostly congruent with genetic differentiation. Biovar 1 would remain in Agrobacterium, biovar 2 to Rhizobium rhizogenes, and biovar 3 to Allorhizobium vitis. By 2014 there is very little, if any, confusion for what Agrobacterium in the strict sense would refer to.

However, another issue remains with the classification inside of biovar 1, specifically inside the Agrobacterium tumefaciens species complex, where biological species remain hard to differentiate without DNA sequencing. Researchers largely still stuck to the old nomenclature based on symptomology, save for a few who take the time to delimit the "genomovars" or "genomospecies" inside of this complex. To add to the confusion, the Approved Lists of 1980 changed the type strain of A. tumefaciens without explanation to "B6", a strain now properly classified as Agrobacterium radiobacter (genomovar 4), causing misled researchers to propose the synonymization of the two. The original type strain of A. tumefaciens, reinstated in 2023, belongs to genomovar 1.

Another strain of "A. tumefaciens" commonly used in early research was C58, which belongs to genomovar 8. For a review of the currently-known structure of the species complex, see Vargas Ribera et al. (2024), which also lists names that have been separately proposed for the genomovars.

This article cites a great number of sources that do not distinguish among the genomovars. Most text in this article should be treated as describing the species complex as a whole.

== Conjugation ==
To be virulent, the bacterium contains a tumour-inducing plasmid (Ti plasmid or pTi) 200 kbp long, which contains the T-DNA and all the genes necessary to transfer it to the plant cell. Many strains of A. tumefaciens do not contain a pTi.

Since the Ti plasmid is essential to cause disease, prepenetration events in the rhizosphere occur to promote bacterial conjugation - exchange of plasmids amongst bacteria. In the presence of opines, A. tumefaciens produces a diffusible conjugation signal called N-(3-oxo-octanoyl)-L-homoserine lactone (3OC8HSL) or the Agrobacterium autoinducer. This activates the transcription factor TraR, positively regulating the transcription of genes required for conjugation.

== Infection methods ==
Agrobacterium tumefaciens infects the plant through its Ti plasmid. The Ti plasmid integrates a segment of its DNA, known as T-DNA, into the chromosomal DNA of its host plant cells. A. tumefaciens has flagella that allow it to swim through the soil towards photoassimilates that accumulate in the rhizosphere around roots. Some strains may chemotactically move towards chemical exudates from plants, such as acetosyringone and sugars, which indicate the presence of a wound in the plant through which the bacteria may enter. Phenolic compounds are recognised by the VirA protein, a transmembrane protein encoded in the virA gene on the Ti plasmid. Sugars are recognised by the chvE protein, a chromosomal gene-encoded protein located in the periplasmic space.

At least 25 vir genes on the Ti plasmid are necessary for tumor induction. In addition to their perception role, virA and chvE induce other vir genes. The VirA protein has autokinase activity: it phosphorylates itself on a histidine residue. Then the VirA protein phosphorylates the VirG protein on its aspartate residue. The virG protein is a cytoplasmic protein produced from the virG Ti plasmid gene. It is a transcription factor, inducing the transcription of the vir operons. The ChvE protein regulates the second mechanism of the vir genes' activation. It increases VirA protein sensitivity to phenolic compounds.

Attachment is a two-step process. Following an initial weak and reversible attachment, the bacteria synthesize cellulose fibrils that anchor them to the wounded plant cell to which they were attracted. Four main genes are involved in this process: chvA, chvB, pscA, and att. The products of the first three genes apparently are involved in the actual synthesis of the cellulose fibrils. These fibrils also anchor the bacteria to each other, helping to form a microcolony.

VirC, the most important virulent protein, is a necessary step in the recombination of illegitimate recolonization. It selects the section of the DNA in the host plant that will be replaced and it cuts into this strand of DNA.

After production of cellulose fibrils, a calcium-dependent outer membrane protein called rhicadhesin is produced, which also aids in sticking the bacteria to the cell wall. Homologues of this protein can be found in other rhizobia. Currently, there are several reports on standardisation of protocol for the Agrobacterium-mediated transformation. The effect of different parameters such as infection time, acetosyringone, DTT, and cysteine have been studied in soybean (Glycine max).

Possible plant compounds that initiate Agrobacterium to infect plant cells:

- Acetosyringone and other phenolic compounds
- alpha-Hydroxyacetosyringone
- Catechol
- Ferulic acid
- Gallic acid
- p-Hydroxybenzoic acid
- Protocatechuic acid
- Pyrogallic acid
- Resorcylic acid
- Sinapinic acid
- Syringic acid
- Vanillin

=== Formation of the T-pilus ===
To transfer T-DNA into a plant cell, A. tumefaciens uses a type IV secretion mechanism, involving the production of a T-pilus. When acetosyringone and other substances are detected, a signal transduction event activates the expression of 11 genes within the VirB operon which are responsible for the formation of the T-pilus.

The pro-pilin is formed first. This is a polypeptide of 121 amino acids which requires processing by the removal of 47 residues to form a T-pilus subunit. The subunit was thought to be circularized by the formation of a peptide bond between the two ends of the polypeptide. However, high-resolution structure of the T-pilus revealed no cyclization of the pilin, with the overall organization of the pilin subunits being highly similar to those of other conjugative pili, such as F-pilus.

Products of the other VirB genes are used to transfer the subunits across the plasma membrane. Yeast two-hybrid studies provide evidence that VirB6, VirB7, VirB8, VirB9 and VirB10 may all encode components of the transporter. An ATPase for the active transport of the subunits would also be required.

=== Transfer of T-DNA into the plant cell ===
1. Agrobacterium cell; 2. Agrobacterium chromosome; 3. Ti Plasmid (a. T-DNA, b. vir genes, c. replication origin, d. opines catabolism); 4. Plant cell; 5. Plant mitochondria; 6. Plant chloroplast; 7. Plant nucleus; 1. VirA recognition; 2. VirA phosphorylates VirG; 3. VirG causes transcription of Vir genes; 4. Vir genes cut out T-DNA and form nucleoprotein complex ("T-complex"); 5. T-complex enters plant cytoplasm through T-pilus; 6. T-DNA enters into plant nucleus through nuclear pore; 7. T-DNA achieves integration

The T-DNA must be cut out of the circular plasmid. This is typically done by the Vir genes within the helper plasmid. A VirD1/D2 complex nicks the DNA at the left and right border sequences. The VirD2 protein is covalently attached to the 5' end. VirD2 contains a motif that leads to the nucleoprotein complex being targeted to the type IV secretion system (T4SS). The structure of the T-pilus showed that the central channel of the pilus is too narrow to allow the transfer of the folded VirD2, suggesting that VirD2 must be partially unfolded during the conjugation process.

In the cytoplasm of the recipient cell, the T-DNA complex becomes coated with VirE2 proteins, which are exported through the T4SS independently from the T-DNA complex. Nuclear localization signals, or NLSs, located on the VirE2 and VirD2, are recognised by the importin alpha protein, which then associates with importin beta and the nuclear pore complex to transfer the T-DNA into the nucleus. VIP1 also appears to be an important protein in the process, possibly acting as an adapter to bring the VirE2 to the importin. Once inside the nucleus, VIP2 may target the T-DNA to areas of chromatin that are being actively transcribed, so that the T-DNA can integrate into the host genome.

== Genes in the T-DNA ==
=== Hormones ===
To cause gall formation, the T-DNA encodes genes for the production of auxin or indole-3-acetic acid via the IAM pathway. This biosynthetic pathway is not used in many plants for the production of auxin, so it means the plant has no molecular means of regulating it and auxin will be produced constitutively. Genes for the production of cytokinins are also expressed. This stimulates cell proliferation and gall formation.

=== Opines ===
The T-DNA contains genes for encoding enzymes that cause the plant to create specialized amino acid derivatives which the bacteria can metabolize, called opines. Opines are a class of chemicals that serve as a source of nitrogen for A. tumefaciens, but not for most other organisms. The specific type of opine produced by A. tumefaciens C58 infected plants is nopaline.

Two nopaline type Ti plasmids, pTi-SAKURA and pTiC58, were fully sequenced. "A. fabrum" C58, (Note: The sequenced genomes of strain C58 is not sufficiently similar to the type strain (either the old B6 and the new A1) of Agrobacterium tumefaciens to be considered the same species. The name "Agrobacterium fabrum" Lassalle et al. 2011 was proposed to contain this strain but the name was not validated.) the first fully sequenced pathovar, was first isolated from a cherry tree crown gall. The genome was simultaneously sequenced by Goodner et al. and Wood et al. in 2001. The genome of strain C58consists of a circular chromosome, two plasmids, and a linear chromosome. The presence of a covalently bonded circular chromosome is common to Bacteria, with few exceptions. However, the presence of both a single circular chromosome and single linear chromosome is unique to a group in this genus. The two plasmids are pTiC58, responsible for the processes involved in virulence, and pAtC58, (Note: "At plasmid" or "pAt" when talking about related plasmids) once dubbed the "cryptic" plasmid.

The pAtC58 plasmid has been shown to be involved in the metabolism of opines and to conjugate with other bacteria in the absence of the pTiC58 plasmid. If the Ti plasmid is removed, the tumor growth that is the means of classifying this species of bacteria does not occur.

== Biotechnological uses ==
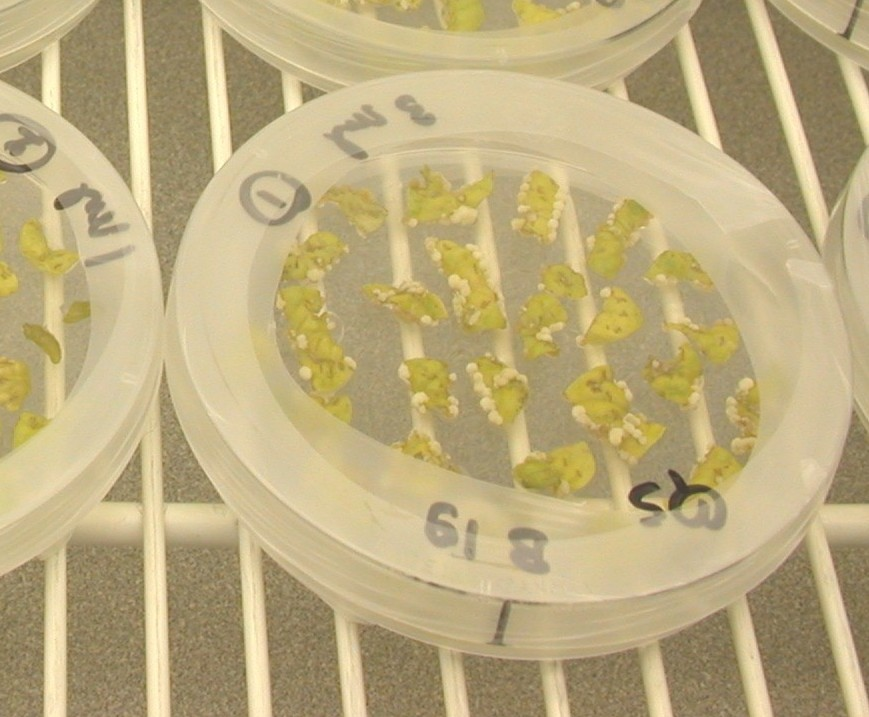
Transformed plant tissue cultures

The Asilomar Conference in 1975 established widespread agreement that recombinant techniques were insufficiently understood and needed to be tightly controlled. The DNA transmission capabilities of Agrobacterium have been vastly explored in biotechnology as a means of inserting foreign genes into plants. Shortly after the Asilomar Conference, Marc Van Montagu and Jeff Schell discovered the gene transfer mechanism between Agrobacterium and plants, which resulted in the development of methods to alter the bacterium into an efficient delivery system for genetic engineering in plants. The plasmid T-DNA that is transferred to the plant is an ideal vehicle for genetic engineering. This is done by cloning a desired gene sequence into T-DNA binary vectors that will be used to deliver a sequence of interest into eukaryotic cells. This process has been performed using the firefly luciferase gene to produce glowing plants. This luminescence has been a useful device in the study of plant chloroplast function and as a reporter gene. It is also possible to transform Arabidopsis thaliana by dipping flowers into a broth of Agrobacterium: the seed produced will be transgenic. Under laboratory conditions, T-DNA has also been transferred to human cells, demonstrating the diversity of insertion application.

The mechanism by which Agrobacterium inserts materials into the host cell is by a type IV secretion system which is very similar to mechanisms used by pathogens to insert materials (usually proteins) into human cells by type III secretion. It also employs a type of signaling conserved in many Gram-negative bacteria called quorum sensing. This makes Agrobacterium an important topic of medical research, as well.

== Natural genetic transformation ==
Natural genetic transformation in bacteria is a sexual process involving the transfer of DNA from one cell to another through the intervening medium, and the integration of the donor sequence into the recipient genome by homologous recombination. A. tumefaciens can undergo natural transformation in soil without any specific physical or chemical treatment.

== Disease cycle ==
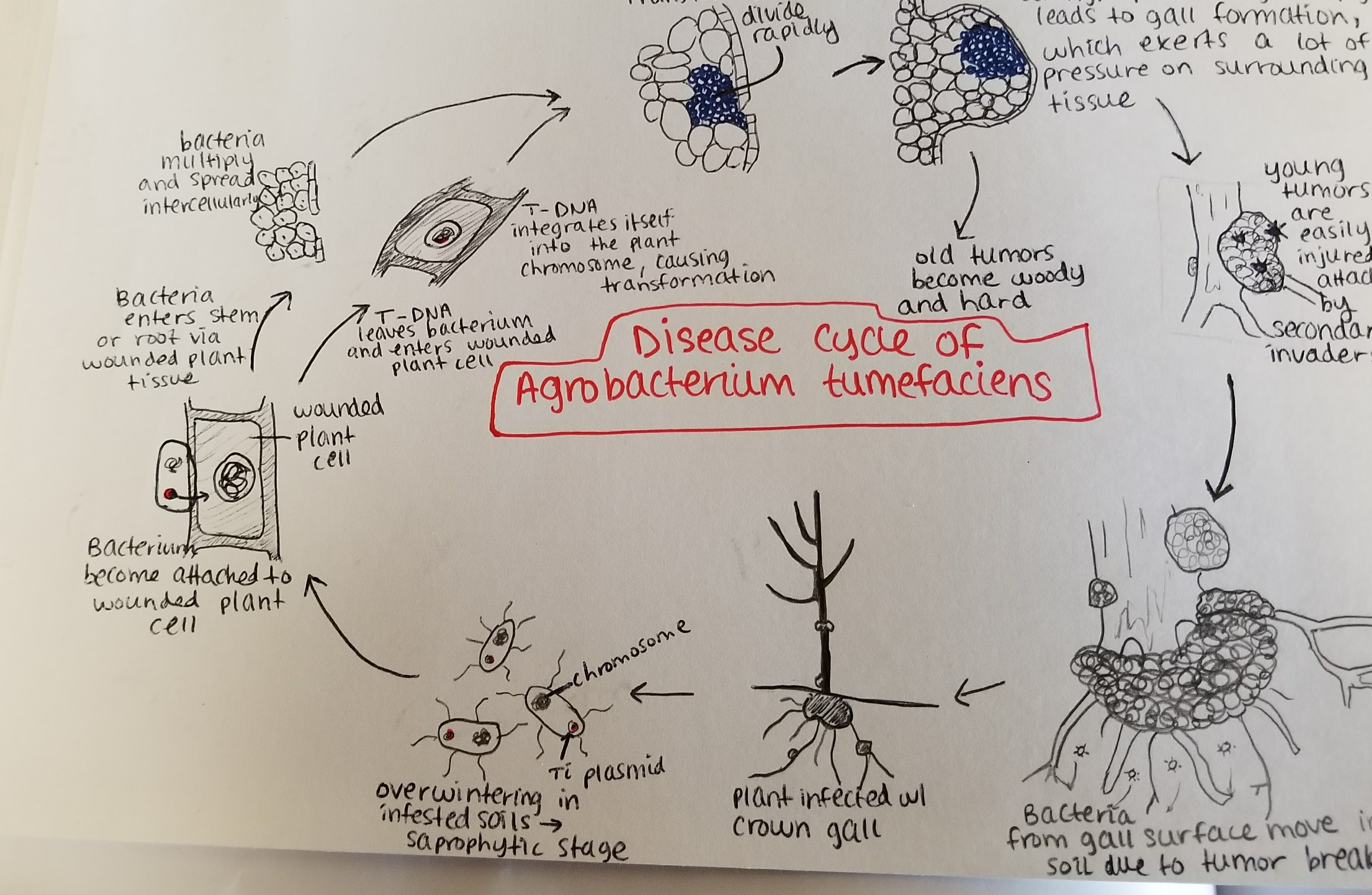
Disease cycle

Agrobacterium tumefaciens overwinters in infested soils. Agrobacterium species live predominantly saprophytic lifestyles, so its common even for plant-parasitic species of this genus to survive in the soil for lengthy periods of time, even without host plant presence. When there is a host plant present, however, the bacteria enter the plant tissue via recent wounds or natural openings of roots or stems near the ground. These wounds may be caused by cultural practices, grafting, insects, etc. Once the bacteria have entered the plant, they occur intercellularly and stimulate surrounding tissue to proliferate due to cell transformation. Agrobacterium performs this control by inserting the plasmid T-DNA into the plant's genome. See above for more details about the process of plasmid DNA insertion into the host genome. Excess growth of the plant tissue leads to gall formation on the stem and roots. These tumors exert significant pressure on the surrounding plant tissue, which causes this tissue to become crushed and/or distorted. The crushed vessels lead to reduced water flow in the xylem. Young tumors are soft and therefore vulnerable to secondary invasion by insects and saprophytic microorganisms. This secondary invasion causes the breakdown of the peripheral cell layers as well as tumor discoloration due to decay. Breakdown of the soft tissue leads to release of the Agrobacterium tumefaciens into the soil allowing it to restart the disease process with a new host plant.

== Disease management ==
Crown gall disease caused by Agrobacterium tumefaciens can be controlled by using various methods. The best way to control this disease is to take preventative measures, such as sterilizing pruning tools so as to avoid infecting new plants. Performing mandatory inspections of nursery stock and rejecting infected plants as well as not planting susceptible plants in infected fields are also valuable practices. Avoiding wounding the crowns/roots of the plants during cultivation is important for preventing disease. In horticultural techniques in which multiple plants are joined to grow as one, such as budding and grafting these techniques lead to plant wounds. Wounds are the primary location of bacterial entry into the host plant. Therefore, it is advisable to perform these techniques during times of the year when Agrobacteria are not active. Control of root-chewing insects is also helpful to reduce levels of infection, since these insects cause wounds (a.k.a. bacterial entryways) in the plant roots. It is recommended that infected plant material be burned rather than placed in a compost pile due to the bacteria's ability to live in the soil for many years.

Biological control methods are also utilized in managing this disease. During the 1970s and 1980s, a common practice for treating germinated seeds, seedlings, and rootstock was to soak them in a suspension of K84. K84 is a strain of Rhizobium rhizogenes (formerly classified under A. radiobacter, but later reclassified) which is a species related to A. tumefaciens but is not pathogenic. K84 produces a bacteriocin (agrocin 84) which is an antibiotic specific against related bacteria, including A. tumefaciens. This method, which was successful at controlling the disease on a commercial scale, had the risk of K84 transferring its resistance gene to the pathogenic Agrobacteria. Thus, in the 1990s, a deletion mutant strain based on K84, known as K1026, was created. This strain is just as successful in controlling crown gall as K84 without the caveat of resistance gene transfer.

== Environment ==
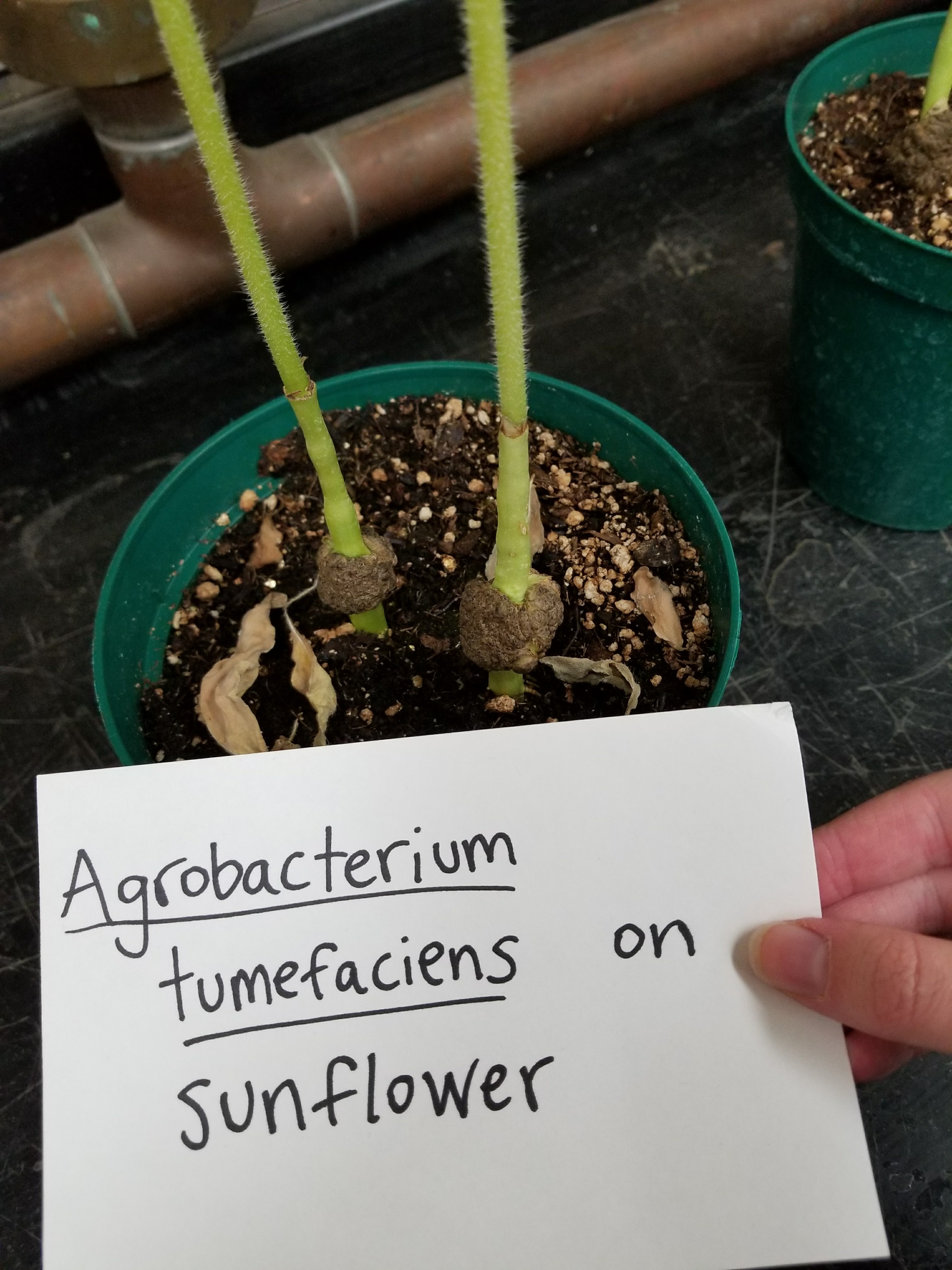
Crown gall of sunflower caused by A. tumefaciens

Host, environment, and pathogen are extremely important concepts in regards to plant pathology. Agrobacteria have the widest host range of any plant pathogen, so the main factor to take into consideration in the case of crown gall is environment. There are various conditions and factors that make for a conducive environment for A. tumefaciens when infecting its various hosts. The bacterium can't penetrate the host plant without an entry point such as a wound. Factors leading to wounds in plants include cultural practices, grafting, freezing injury, growth cracks, soil insects, and other animals in the environment causing damage to the plant. Consequently, in exceptionally harsh winters, it is common to have an increased incidence of crown gall due to the weather-related damage. Along with this, there are methods of mediating infection of the host plant. For example, nematodes can act as a vector to introduce Agrobacterium into plant roots. More specifically, the root parasitic nematodes damage the plant cell, creating a wound for the bacteria to enter through. Finally, temperature is a factor when considering A. tumefaciens infection. The optimal temperature for crown gall formation due to this bacterium is 22 °C (72 °F) because of the thermosensitivity of T-DNA transfer. Tumor formation is significantly reduced at higher temperature conditions.

== See also ==
- suhB
