= Opine =

Low molecular weight compound

Opines are low molecular weight compounds found in plant crown gall tumors or hairy root tumors produced by pathogenic bacteria of the genus Agrobacterium and Rhizobium. Opine biosynthesis is catalyzed by specific enzymes encoded by genes contained in a small segment of DNA (known as the T-DNA, for 'transfer DNA'), which is part of the Ti plasmid (in Agrobacterium) or Ri plasmid (in Rhizobium), inserted by the bacterium into the plant genome. The opines are used by the bacterium as an important energy, carbon and nitrogen source. Each strain of Agrobacterium and Rhizobium induces and catabolizes a specific set of opines, this set typifying the Ti plasmid and Ri plasmid. There are some 30 different opines described so far.

General overview of opine-synthesis

== Chemical structure ==
Chemically, opines fall into two major structural classes:

Chemical structure of nopaline

Chemical structure of octopine

1. The vast majority are secondary amine derivatives resulting from the reduction of the imine formed by condensation of an amino acid, either with a keto acid or a sugar. The first subcategory includes the opines from the nopaline and octopine families. The nopaline family (nopaline, nopalinic acid, leucinopine, glutaminopine, succinamopine) is formed when alpha-ketoglutarate serves as the keto substrate in the condensation reaction. The octopine family (octopine, octopinic acid, lysopine, histopine) is formed when pyruvate is involved in the condensation reaction.

Chemical structure of mannopine

The second subcategory includes the mannityl family (mannopine, mannopinic acid, agropine, agropinic acid) and the chrysopine family (deoxy-fructosyl glutamate, deoxy-fructosyl glutamine, deoxy-fructosyl oxoproline and chrysopine) formed by the condensation of an amino-acid with mannose.

2. Agrocinopines form a small, separate class of opines. Chemically they are sugar-phosphodiesters. For example, agrocinopine A is a phosphodiester of sucrose and L-arabinose.

== Nomenclature ==
The name opine comes from octopine, the first opine discovered in 1927, not in crown galls, but in octopus muscle. Nopaline comes from the identification of this molecule in tumors that appeared on "nopal", the Spanish and French names of Opuntia spp. cactus. According to Oxford English Dictionary, the word opine was first used in print in 1977. Usually, the name of newly discovered opines has the ending "-opine". Exceptions are nopaline and strombine. On the other hand, not all molecule names ending in "-opine" are opines. For example, atropine, stylopine, europine, and lycopine belong to different classes of molecules.

== Other sources of opines ==
Opines and opine-like substances are not restricted to crown galls tumors. The very first opine discovered, octopine, was initially isolated from octopus muscle. Similar derivatives have been isolated from muscle tissue of certain marine invertebrates: alanopine, strombine, and tauropine. Opines like acetopine and nopaline can also be formed in normal callus and plant tissue as a result of arginine metabolism. Saccharopine is an intermediate in the metabolism of amino acid lysine and occurs in fungi, higher plants and mammals, including humans. The poisonous mushroom Clitocybe acromelalga is a source of four opine type amino acids: valinopine, epileucinopine, isoleucinopine and phenylalaninopine.

== Biosynthesis ==
The enzyme opine dehydrogenase catalyses reactions that make opines by adding a molecule of pyruvic acid or other keto acids to L-amino acids. This includes making derivatives of L-methionine, L-isoleucine, L-valine, and L-phenylalanine. A typical example is the reaction to give (2S)-2-[(R)-1-carboxyethylamino]pentanoic acid (1):

Norvaline
+ NADH +
Pyruvic acid
H^{+}
H_{2}O
H^{+}
H_{2}O
(1)
+ NAD^{+}

The enzyme uses nicotinamide adenine dinucleotide as its cofactor.

Similarly, D-nopaline dehydrogenase, also called nopaline synthase, produces or degrades nopaline:

Arginine
+ NADPH +
α-Ketoglutaric acid
H^{+}
H_{2}O
H^{+}
H_{2}O
Nopaline
+ NADP^{+}

Nopaline is a combination of the amino acid L-arginine with α-ketoglutaric acid.

== List of opines ==
This is an alphabetical list of some opines or opine-like compounds.

Acetopine

Acetopine (N^{2}-(carboxymethyl)-arginine or demethyl-octopine) was isolated from cotton (Gossypium hirsutum) and soybean (Glycine max) callus. It wasn't found in plant tissues transformed by Agrobacterium and therefore it is not considered a "true" opine.

Agrocinopines

Agrocinopines (A-D) are a separate class of opines. They are sugar-phosphodiesters. Agrocinopine A is phosphodiester of sucrose and L-Arabinose. Agrocinopine B is the corresponding phosphodiester, in which the glucose has been hydrolyzed from the sucrose portion of agrocinopine A.

Agropine

Agropine (1'-deoxy-D-mannitol-1'-yl)-L-glutamine,1',2'-lactone) was obtained from crown gall tumors. It is a member of the mannityl family. It is derived from mannopine through the formation of a lactone.

Agropinic acid

Agropinic acid (N-1-(D-mannityl)-L-glutamic acid lactam) is produced by crown gall tumors. Belongs to the mannityl family. It is formed by lactamization of agropine.

Alanopine

Beta-alanopine (2,2'-iminodipropionic acid or L-alanine, N-(1-carboxyethyl)-) and meso-alanopine (meso-N-(1-carboxyethyl)-alanine) were isolated from marine invertebrates. Structurally it is a member of the octopine family.

Asparaginopine

See succinamopine

Chrysopine

Chrysopine (d-lactone of N-1-deoxy-D-fructosyl-L-glutamine) was first obtained from fig tree and chrysanthemum crown gall tumors. It is the deoxyfructosyl analog of agropine.

Cucumopine

Cucumopine (4,6-dicarboxy-4,5,6,7-tetrahydro-1H-imidazo[4,5-c]pyridine-4-propanoic acid) was found in grapevine crown gall tumours and carrot hairy-root cultures.

Epileucinopine

Epileucinopine (N-(1-carboxy-3-methylbutyl)glutamic acid or N^{2}-(1,3-dicarboxypropyl)leucine) was isolated from the poisonous mushroom Clitocybe acromelalga.

Glutaminopine

Glutaminopine (N^{2}-(D-1,3-dicarboxypropyl) derivative of glutamine) is a member of the nopaline family isolated from crown gall tumors.

Heliopine

Heliopine (also named vitopine) (N^{2} -(1-carboxyethyl)glutamine) was obtained from crown gall tumors.

Histopine

Histopine (N-(D-1-carboxyethyl)histidine) is a member of the octopine family found in crown gall tumors.

Isoleucinopine

Isoleucinopine (N-(1-carboxy-2-methylbutyl)glutamic acid or N-(1,3-dicarboxypropyl)isoleucine) was isolated from the poisonous mushroom Clitocybe acromelalga.

Leucinopine

Leucinopine (N^{2}-(D-1,3-dicarboxypropyl) derivative of leucine) is a member of the nopaline family isolated from crown gall tumors.

Lysopine

Lysopine (N^{2}-(D-1-carboxyethyl)-L-lysine) is a member of the octopine family found in crown gall tumors.

Mannopine

Mannopine (N-1-(D-mannityl)-L-glutamine) is found in crown gall tumors. It is the head member of the mannityl family of opines.

Mannopinic acid

Mannopinic acid (N-1-(D-mannityl)-L-glutamic acid) was isolated from crown gall tumors. Belongs to the mannityl family.

Methiopine

Methiopine (N-[1-D-(carboxyl)ethyl]-L-methionine) was found in crown gall tumors.

Mikimopine

Mikimopine (4-epimer of cucumopine) was first isolated from tobacco crow gall tumors.

Nopaline

Nopaline (N^{2}-(D-1,3-dicarboxypropyl)-L-arginine) was first isolated from crown gall tumors. It is the head member of the nopaline family of opines. It was also found in certain nontransformed plant tissues as a result of arginine metabolism

Nopalinic acid

Nopalinic acid (also named ornaline) (N^{2}-(D-1,3-dicarboxypropyl)-L-ornithine) is a member of the nopaline family found in crown gall tumors.

Octopine

Octopine (N^{2}-(D-1-carboxyethyl)-L-arginine) is the first opine discovered in 1927 in octopus muscle and later in crown gall tumors. It is also found in other cephalopod species and lamellibranchs. It is the head member of the octopine family of opines.

Octopinic acid

Octopinic acid (N^{2}-(D-1-carboxyethyl)-L-ornithine) is a member of the octopine family isolated from crown gall tumors.

Ornaline

See nopalinic acid

Phenylalaninopine

Phenylalaninopine (N-(1-carboxy-2-phenylethyl)glutamic acid) was isolated from the poisonous mushroom Clitocybe acromelalga.

Rideopine

Rideopine (N-(4'-aminobutyl)-D-glutamic acid) is an opine-like molecule derived from putrescine. It is obtained from crown gall tumors.

Saccharopine

Although not found in crown gall tumors, saccharopine (epsilon-N-(L-glutar-2-yl)-L-lysine) is chemically similar to "true" opines. It is formed by condensation of lysine and alpha-ketoglutarate. Saccharopine is an intermediate in the metabolism of amino acid lysine and occurs in fungi, higher plants and mammals, including man.

Santhopine

Santhopine is the deoxyfructosyl analog of mannopine. It is a naturally occurring compound found in rotting fruits and vegetables. It was also isolated from crown gall tumors.

Strombine

Strombine (Methylimidodiacetic acid or N-(D-1-carboxyethyl)-glycine) was first isolated from the gastropod mollusk Strombus. It acts as a fish attractant. Structurally it is a member of the octopine family.

Succinamopine

Succinamopine (also named asparaginopine) (N-(3-amino-1-carboxy-3-oxopropyl)glutamic acid) is a member of the nopaline family isolated from crown gall tumors. Its structure is analogous to that of nopaline, with asparagine replacing arginine.

Tauropine

Tauropine (N-(D-1-carboxyethyl)-taurine) was found in some marine invertebrates. It is also called rhodoic acid. Structurally it is a member of the octopine family.

Valinopine

Valinopine (N-(1-carboxy-2-methylpropyl)glutamic acid or N-(1,3-dicarboxypropyl)valine) was isolated from the poisonous mushroom Clitocybe acromelalga.

Vitopine

See heliopine
