= Escherichia coli in molecular biology =

Gram-negative gammaproteobacterium

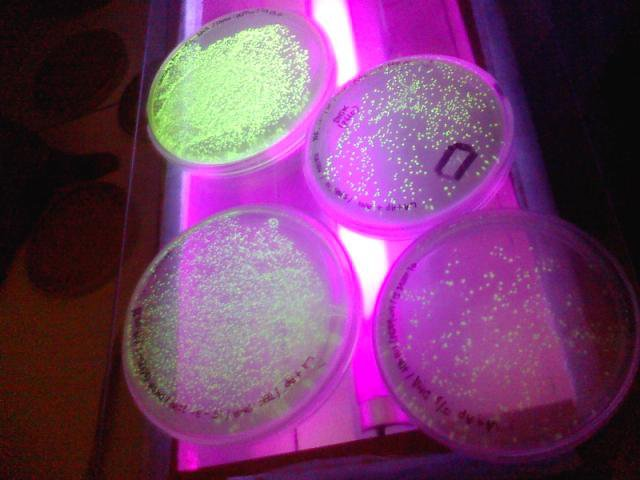
E. coli colonies containing the fluorescent pGLO plasmid

Escherichia coli (/ˌɛʃɪˈrɪkiə ˈkoʊlaɪ/; commonly abbreviated E. coli) is a Gram-negative gammaproteobacterium commonly found in the lower intestine of warm-blooded organisms (endotherms). The descendants of two isolates, K-12 and B strain, are used routinely in molecular biology as both a tool and a model organism.

== Diversity ==
Escherichia coli is one of the most diverse bacterial species, with several pathogenic strains with different symptoms and with only 20% of the genome common to all strains. Furthermore, from the evolutionary point of view, the members of genus Shigella (dysenteriae, flexneri, boydii, sonnei) are actually E. coli strains "in disguise" (i.e. E. coli is paraphyletic to the genus).

== History ==
In 1885, Theodor Escherich, a German pediatrician, first discovered this species in the feces of healthy individuals and called it Bacterium coli commune because it is found in the colon and early classifications of Prokaryotes placed these in a handful of genera based on their shape and motility (at that time Ernst Haeckel's classification of Bacteria in the kingdom Monera was in place).

Following a revision of Bacteria it was reclassified as Bacillus coli by Migula in 1895 and later reclassified as Escherichia coli.

Due to its ease of culture and fast doubling, it was used in the early microbiology experiments; however, bacteria were considered primitive and pre-cellular and received little attention before 1944, when Avery, Macleod and McCarty demonstrated that DNA was the genetic material using Salmonella typhimurium, following which Escherichia coli was used for linkage mapping studies.

== Strains ==
Four of the many E. coli strains (K-12, B, C, and W) are thought of as model organism strains. These are classified in Risk Group 1 in biosafety guidelines.

=== Escherich's isolate ===
The first isolate of Escherich was deposited in NCTC in 1920 by the Lister Institute in London (NCTC 86). It was isolated in 1885 from a child with no overt diarrhea. The strain was sequenced in 2017. It belongs to E. coli subgroup A.

=== Type strains ===
The original E. coli type strain is said to have been lost due to a lack of culture collections until the 1920s. In 1963, the strain U5/41, isolated in 1941 from the urine of a Danish patient with cystitis, was selected as the neotype. U5/41^{T} was sequenced in 2013. It carries a incFII-type plasmid and belongs to subgroup B2.

=== K-12 ===
A strain was isolated from a stool sample of a patient convalescent from diphtheria and was labelled K-12 (not an antigen) in 1922 at Stanford University. This isolate was used in 1940s by Charles E. Clifton to study nitrogen metabolism, who deposited it in ATCC (strain ATCC 10798) and lent it to Edward Tatum for his tryptophan biosynthesis experiments, despite its idiosyncrasies due to the F+ λ+ phenotype. It belongs to E. coli subgroup A.

In the course of the passages it lost its O antigen and in 1953 was cured first of its lambda phage (W1485, ATCC 12435; by UV by Joshua Lederberg and colleagues) and then in 1985 of the F plasmid by acridine orange curing.

W1485 gave rise to MG1655. Strains derived from MG1655 include DH1, parent of DH5α and in turn of DH10B (rebranded as TOP10 by Invitrogen). An alternative lineage from W1485 is that of W2637 (which contains an inversion rrnD-rrnE), which in turn resulted in W3110.

Characteristic mutations of K-12 relative to other E. coli include:

- At least in W1485 and descendants，susceptibility pyrimidine starvation from a premature end of rph (Rnase PH) due to 1-base deletion.
- Deletion of 3,205 bp in the aga gene cluster, abolishing its ability to use galactosamine and N-Acetylgalactosamine. Some descendants can use the latter but not the former via two additional suppressor mutations.

Due to the lack of specific record-keeping, the "pedigree" of strains was not available and had to be inferred by consulting lab-book and records in order to set up the E. coli Genetic Stock Centre at Yale by Barbara Bachmann. The different strains have been derived through treating E. coli K-12 with agents such as nitrogen mustard, ultra-violet radiation, X-ray etc.

=== B strain ===
A second common laboratory strain is the B strain, whose history is less straightforward and the first naming of the strain as E. coli B was by Delbrück and Luria in 1942 in their study of bacteriophages T1 and T7. The original E. coli B strain, known then as Bacillus coli, originated from Félix d'Herelle from the Institut Pasteur in Paris around 1918 who studied bacteriophages, who claimed that it originated from Collection of the Institut Pasteur, but no strains of that period exist. The strain of d'Herelle was passed to Jules Bordet, Director of the Institut Pasteur du Brabant in Bruxelles and his student André Gratia. The former passed the strain to Ann Kuttner ("the Bact. coli obtained from Dr. Bordet") and in turn to Eugène Wollman (B. coli Bordet), whose son deposited it in 1963 (CIP 63.70) as "strain BAM" (B American), while André Gratia passed the strain to Martha Wollstein, a researcher at Rockefeller, who refers to the strain as "Brussels strain of Bacillus coli" in 1921, who in turn passed it to Jacques Bronfenbrenner (B. coli P.C.), who passed it to Delbrück and Luria.

The strain of Delbrück and Luria gave rise to several other strains, such as REL606 and BL21. A genealogy of B-derived strains, much more readable than prose, is available in Daegelen et al. (2009). Strain B and descendants belong to E. coli subgroup A.

=== C strain ===
E. coli C is morphologically distinct from other E. coli strains; it is more spherical in shape and has a distinct distribution of its nucleoid. It was sequenced in 2017. It is more closely related to BL21 than to K-12 strains. It belongs to E. coli subgroup C.

=== W strain ===
The W strain was isolated from the soil near Rutgers University by Selman Waksman. It belongs to E. coli subgroup B1.

== Role in biotechnology ==
Because of its long history of laboratory culture and ease of manipulation, E. coli also plays an important role in modern biological engineering and industrial microbiology. The work of Stanley Norman Cohen and Herbert Boyer in E. coli, using plasmids and restriction enzymes to create recombinant DNA, became a foundation of biotechnology.

Considered a very versatile host for the production of heterologous proteins, researchers can introduce genes into the microbes using plasmids, allowing for the mass production of proteins in industrial fermentation processes. Genetic systems have also been developed which allow the production of recombinant proteins using E. coli. One of the first useful applications of recombinant DNA technology was the manipulation of E. coli to produce human insulin. Modified E. coli have been used in vaccine development, bioremediation, and production of immobilised enzymes. Various strains of E. Coli are used to produce proteins, BL21(DE3) or its derivatives.

E. coli have been used successfully to produce proteins previously thought difficult or impossible in E. coli, such as those containing multiple disulfide bonds or those requiring post-translational modification for stability or function. The cellular environment of E. coli is normally too reducing for disulphide bonds to form, proteins with disulphide bonds therefore may be secreted to its periplasmic space, however, mutants in which the reduction of both thioredoxins and glutathione is impaired also allow disulphide bonded proteins to be produced in the cytoplasm of E. coli. It has also been used to produce proteins with various post-translational modifications, including glycoproteins by using the N-linked glycosylation system of Campylobacter jejuni engineered into E. coli. Efforts are currently under way to expand this technology to produce complex glycosylations.

Studies are also being performed into programming E. coli to potentially solve complicated mathematics problems such as the Hamiltonian path problem.

== Model organism ==
E. coli is frequently used as a model organism in microbiology studies. Cultivated strains (e.g. E. coli K-12) are well-adapted to the laboratory environment, and, unlike wild type strains, have lost their ability to thrive in the intestine. Many lab strains lose their ability to form biofilms. These features protect wild type strains from antibodies and other chemical attacks, but require a large expenditure of energy and material resources.

In 1946, Joshua Lederberg and Edward Tatum first described the phenomenon known as bacterial conjugation using E. coli as a model bacterium, and it remains a primary model to study conjugation. E. coli was an integral part of the first experiments to understand phage genetics, and early researchers, such as Seymour Benzer, used E. coli and phage T4 to understand the topography of gene structure. Prior to Benzer's research, it was not known whether the gene was a linear structure, or if it had a branching pattern.

E. coli was one of the first organisms to have its genome sequenced; the complete genome of E. coli K-12 was published by Science in 1997.

== Lenski's long-term evolution experiment ==
The long-term evolution experiments using E. coli, begun by Richard Lenski in 1988, have allowed direct observation of major evolutionary shifts in the laboratory. In this experiment, one population of E. coli unexpectedly evolved the ability to aerobically metabolize citrate. This capacity is extremely rare in E. coli. E. coli usually does grow on citrate in anaerobic conditions and has an active citric acid cycle which can metabolize citrate even under aerobic conditions. The aerobic event is mainly an issue of citrate being able to enter the cell, caused by CitT not being expressed under aerobic conditions. The regulation of citrate fermentation genes was studied in more detail in 2020. The population evolved the ability to use citrate by having an extra copy of CitT under a different promoter.

As the inability to grow aerobically is normally used as a diagnostic criterion with which to differentiate E. coli from other, closely related bacteria such as Salmonella, this innovation may mark a speciation event observed in the lab. However, the species concept in bacterial taxonomy also requires sufficient genetic distance, which the evolution has not achieved.
