= Genetically modified organism =

Organism altered by genetic engineering

A genetically modified organism (GMO) is any organism whose genetic material has been altered using genetic engineering techniques. The exact definition of a genetically modified organism and what constitutes genetic engineering varies, with the most common being an organism altered in a way that "does not occur naturally by mating and/or natural recombination". A wide variety of organisms have been genetically modified (GM), including animals, plants, and microorganisms.

Genetic modification can include the introduction of new genes or enhancing, altering, or knocking out endogenous genes. In some genetic modifications, genes are transferred within the same species, across species (creating transgenic organisms), and even across kingdoms. Creating a genetically modified organism is a multi-step process. Genetic engineers must isolate the gene they wish to insert into the host organism and combine it with other genetic elements, including a promoter and terminator region and often a selectable marker. A number of techniques are available for inserting the isolated gene into the host genome. Recent advancements using genome editing techniques, notably CRISPR, have made the production of GMOs much simpler. Herbert Boyer and Stanley Cohen made the first genetically modified organism in 1973, a bacterium resistant to the antibiotic kanamycin. The first genetically modified animal, a mouse, was created in 1974 by Rudolf Jaenisch, and the first plant was produced in 1983. In 1994, the Flavr Savr tomato was released, the first commercialized genetically modified food. The first genetically modified animal to be commercialized was the GloFish (2003) and the first genetically modified animal to be approved for food use was the AquAdvantage salmon in 2015.

Bacteria are the easiest organisms to engineer and have been used for research, food production, industrial protein purification (including drugs), agriculture, and art. There is potential to use them for environmental purposes or as medicine. Fungi have been engineered with much the same goals. Viruses play an important role as vectors for inserting genetic information into other organisms. This use is especially relevant to human gene therapy. There are proposals to remove the virulent genes from viruses to create vaccines. Plants have been engineered for scientific research, to create new colors in plants, deliver vaccines, and to create enhanced crops. Genetically modified crops are publicly the most controversial GMOs, in spite of having the most human health and environmental benefits. Animals are generally much harder to transform and the vast majority are still at the research stage. Mammals are the best model organisms for humans. Livestock is modified with the intention of improving economically important traits such as growth rate, quality of meat, milk composition, disease resistance, and survival. Genetically modified fish are used for scientific research, as pets, and as a food source. Genetic engineering has been proposed as a way to control mosquitos, a vector for many deadly diseases. Although human gene therapy is still relatively new, it has been used to treat genetic disorders such as severe combined immunodeficiency and Leber's congenital amaurosis.

Many objections have been raised over the development of GMOs, particularly their commercialization. Many of these involve GM crops and whether food produced from them is safe and what impact growing them will have on the environment. Other concerns are the objectivity and rigor of regulatory authorities, contamination of non-genetically modified food, control of the food supply, patenting of life, and the use of intellectual property rights. Although there is a scientific consensus that currently available food derived from GM crops poses no greater risk to human health than conventional food, GM food safety is a leading issue with critics. Gene flow, impact on non-target organisms, and escape are the major environmental concerns. Countries have adopted regulatory measures to deal with these concerns. There are differences in the regulation for the release of GMOs between countries, with some of the most marked differences occurring between the US and Europe. Key issues concerning regulators include whether GM food should be labeled and the status of gene-edited organisms.

== Definition ==
The definition of a genetically modified organism (GMO) is not clear and varies widely between countries, international bodies, and other communities. At its broadest, the definition of a GMO can include anything that has had its genes altered, including by nature. Taking a less broad view, it can encompass every organism that has had its genes altered by humans, which would include all crops and livestock. In 1993, the Encyclopedia Britannica defined genetic engineering as "any of a wide range of techniques ... among them artificial insemination, in vitro fertilization (e.g., 'test-tube' babies), sperm banks, cloning, and gene manipulation." The European Union (EU) included a similarly broad definition in early reviews, specifically mentioning GMOs being produced by "selective breeding and other means of artificial selection" These definitions were promptly adjusted with a number of exceptions added as the result of pressure from scientific and farming communities, as well as developments in science. The EU definition later excluded traditional breeding, in vitro fertilization, induction of polyploidy, mutation breeding, and cell fusion techniques that do not use recombinant nucleic acids or a genetically modified organism in the process.

Another approach was the definition provided by the Food and Agriculture Organization, the World Health Organization, and the European Commission, stating that the organisms must be altered in a way that does "not occur naturally by mating and/or natural recombination". Progress in science, such as the discovery of horizontal gene transfer being a relatively common natural phenomenon, further added to the confusion on what "occurs naturally", which led to further adjustments and exceptions. There are examples of crops that fit this definition, but are not normally considered GMOs. For example, the grain crop triticale was fully developed in a laboratory in 1930 using various techniques to alter its genome.

Genetically engineered organism (GEO) can be considered a more precise term compared to GMO when describing organisms' genomes that have been directly manipulated with biotechnology. The Cartagena Protocol on Biosafety used the synonym living modified organism (LMO) in 2000 and defined it as "any living organism that possesses a novel combination of genetic material obtained through the use of modern biotechnology." Modern biotechnology is further defined as "In vitro nucleic acid techniques, including recombinant deoxyribonucleic acid (DNA) and direct injection of nucleic acid into cells or organelles, or fusion of cells beyond the taxonomic family."

Originally, the term GMO was not commonly used by scientists to describe genetically engineered organisms until after usage of GMO became common in popular media. The United States Department of Agriculture (USDA) considers GMOs to be plants or animals with heritable changes introduced by genetic engineering or traditional methods, while GEO specifically refers to organisms with genes introduced, eliminated, or rearranged using molecular biology, particularly recombinant DNA techniques, such as transgenesis.

The definitions focus on the process more than the product, which means there could be GMOS and non-GMOs with very similar genotypes and phenotypes. This has led scientists to label it as a scientifically meaningless category, saying that it is impossible to group all the different types of GMOs under one common definition. It has also caused issues for organic institutions and groups looking to ban GMOs. It also poses problems as new processes are developed. The current definitions came in before genome editing became popular and there is some confusion as to whether they are GMOs. The EU has adjudged that they are changing their GMO definition to include "organisms obtained by mutagenesis", but has excluded those "obtained by means of certain mutagenesis techniques, namely those which have conventionally been used in a number of applications and have a long safety record" from regulation. This refers to traditional random mutagenesis (radiation/chemical mutation breeding) and would not exclude "new techniques" (especially those that have emerged since the adoption of the GMO directive) like gene editing. In contrast the USDA has ruled that gene edited organisms are not considered GMOs.

Even greater inconsistency and confusion is associated with various "Non-GMO" or "GMO-free" labeling schemes in food marketing, where even products such as water or salt, which do not contain any organic substances and genetic material (and thus cannot be genetically modified by definition), are being labeled to create an impression of being "more healthy".

== Production ==
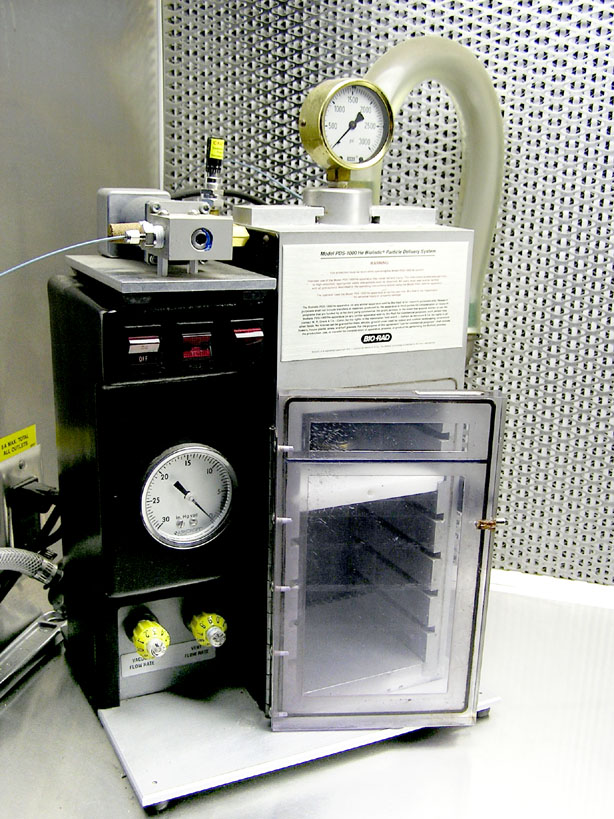
A gene gun uses biolistics to insert DNA into plant tissue.

Creating a genetically modified organism (GMO) is a multi-step process. Genetic engineers must isolate the gene they wish to insert into the host organism. This gene can be taken from a cell or artificially synthesized. If the chosen gene or the donor organism's genome has been well studied it may already be accessible from a genetic library. The gene is then combined with other genetic elements, including a promoter and terminator region and a selectable marker.

A number of techniques are available for inserting the isolated gene into the host genome. Bacteria can be induced to take up foreign DNA, usually by exposed heat shock or electroporation. DNA is generally inserted into animal cells using microinjection, where it can be injected through the cell's nuclear envelope directly into the nucleus, or through the use of viral vectors. In plants the DNA is often inserted using Agrobacterium-mediated recombination, biolistics or electroporation.

As only a single cell is transformed with genetic material, the organism must be regenerated from that single cell. In plants this is accomplished through tissue culture. In animals it is necessary to ensure that the inserted DNA is present in the embryonic stem cells. Further testing using PCR, Southern hybridization, and DNA sequencing is conducted to confirm that an organism contains the new gene.

Traditionally the new genetic material was inserted randomly within the host genome. Gene targeting techniques, which creates double-stranded breaks and takes advantage on the cells natural homologous recombination repair systems, have been developed to target insertion to exact locations. Genome editing uses artificially engineered nucleases that create breaks at specific points. There are four families of engineered nucleases: meganucleases, zinc finger nucleases, transcription activator-like effector nucleases (TALENs), and the Cas9-guideRNA system (adapted from CRISPR). TALEN and CRISPR are the two most commonly used and each has its own advantages. TALENs have greater target specificity, while CRISPR is easier to design and more efficient.

== History ==
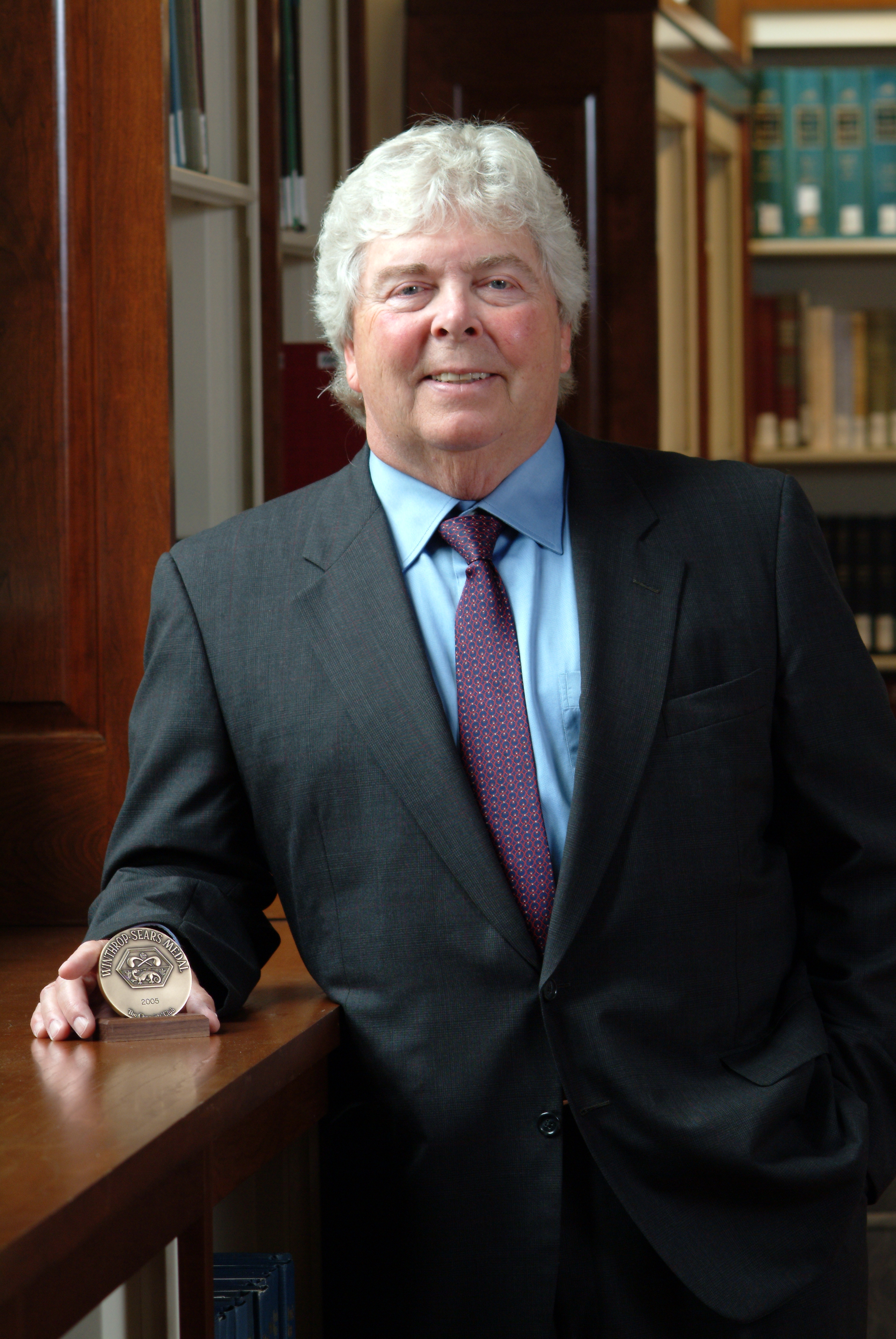
Herbert Boyer (pictured) and Stanley Cohen created the first genetically modified organism in 1973.

Humans have domesticated plants and animals since around 12,000 BCE, using selective breeding or artificial selection (as contrasted with natural selection). The process of selective breeding, in which organisms with desired traits (and thus with the desired genes) are used to breed the next generation and organisms lacking the trait are not bred, is a precursor to the modern concept of genetic modification. Various advancements in genetics allowed humans to directly alter the DNA and therefore genes of organisms. In 1972, Paul Berg created the first recombinant DNA molecule when he combined DNA from a monkey virus with that of the lambda virus.

Herbert Boyer and Stanley Cohen made the first genetically modified organism in 1973. They took a gene from a bacterium that provided resistance to the antibiotic kanamycin, inserted it into a plasmid and then induced other bacteria to incorporate the plasmid. The bacteria that had successfully incorporated the plasmid was then able to survive in the presence of kanamycin. Boyer and Cohen expressed other genes in bacteria. This included genes from the toad Xenopus laevis in 1974, creating the first GMO expressing a gene from an organism of a different kingdom.

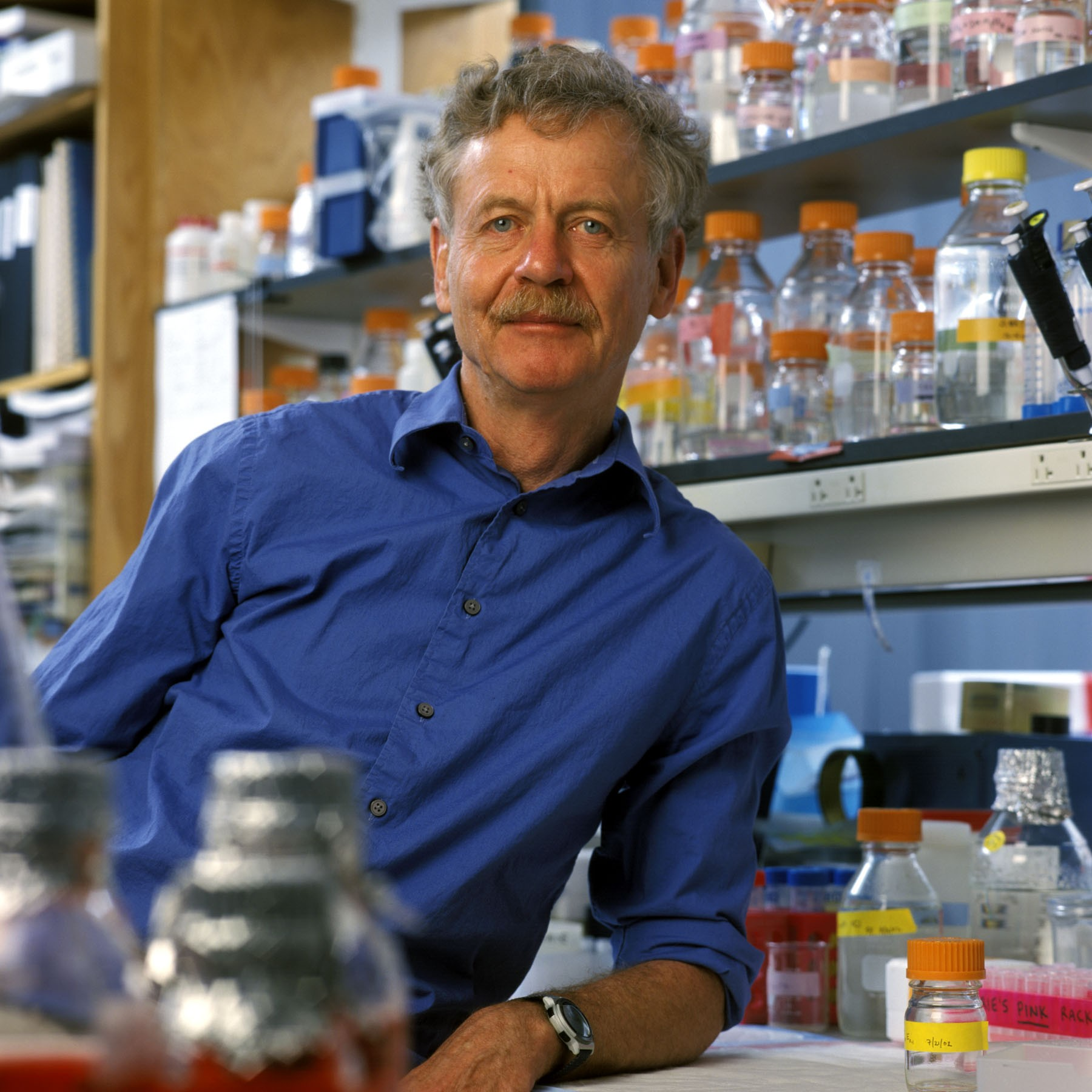
In 1974, Rudolf Jaenisch created the first genetically modified animal.

In 1974, Rudolf Jaenisch created a transgenic mouse by introducing foreign DNA into its embryo, making it the world's first transgenic animal. However it took another eight years before transgenic mice were developed that passed the transgene to their offspring. Genetically modified mice were created in 1984 that carried cloned oncogenes, predisposing them to developing cancer. Mice with genes removed (termed a knockout mouse) were created in 1989. The first transgenic livestock were produced in 1985 and the first animal to synthesize transgenic proteins in their milk were mice in 1987. The mice were engineered to produce human tissue plasminogen activator, a protein involved in breaking down blood clots.

In 1983, the first genetically engineered plant was developed by Michael W. Bevan, Richard B. Flavell and Mary-Dell Chilton. They infected tobacco with Agrobacterium transformed with an antibiotic resistance gene and through tissue culture techniques were able to grow a new plant containing the resistance gene. The gene gun was invented in 1987, allowing transformation of plants not susceptible to Agrobacterium infection. In 2000, Vitamin A-enriched golden rice was the first plant developed with increased nutrient value.

In 1976, Genentech, the first genetic engineering company was founded by Herbert Boyer and Robert Swanson; a year later, the company produced a human protein (somatostatin) in E. coli. Genentech announced the production of genetically engineered human insulin in 1978. The insulin produced by bacteria, branded Humulin, was approved for release by the Food and Drug Administration in 1982. In 1988, the first human antibodies were produced in plants. In 1987, a strain of Pseudomonas syringae became the first genetically modified organism to be released into the environment when a strawberry and potato field in California were sprayed with it.

The first genetically modified crop, an antibiotic-resistant tobacco plant, was produced in 1982. China was the first country to commercialize transgenic plants, introducing a virus-resistant tobacco in 1992. In 1994, Calgene attained approval to commercially release the Flavr Savr tomato, the first genetically modified food. Also in 1994, the European Union approved tobacco engineered to be resistant to the herbicide bromoxynil, making it the first genetically engineered crop commercialized in Europe. An insect resistant Potato was approved for release in the US in 1995, and by 1996 approval had been granted to commercially grow 8 transgenic crops and one flower crop (carnation) in 6 countries plus the EU.

In 2010, scientists at the J. Craig Venter Institute announced that they had created the first synthetic bacterial genome. They named it Synthia and it was the world's first synthetic life form.

The first genetically modified animal to be commercialized was the GloFish, a Zebra fish with a fluorescent gene added that allows it to glow in the dark under ultraviolet light. It was released to the US market in 2003. In 2015, AquAdvantage salmon became the first genetically modified animal to be approved for food use. Approval is for fish raised in Panama and sold in the US. The salmon were transformed with a growth hormone-regulating gene from a Pacific Chinook salmon and a promoter from an ocean pout enabling it to grow year-round instead of only during spring and summer.

== Plants ==
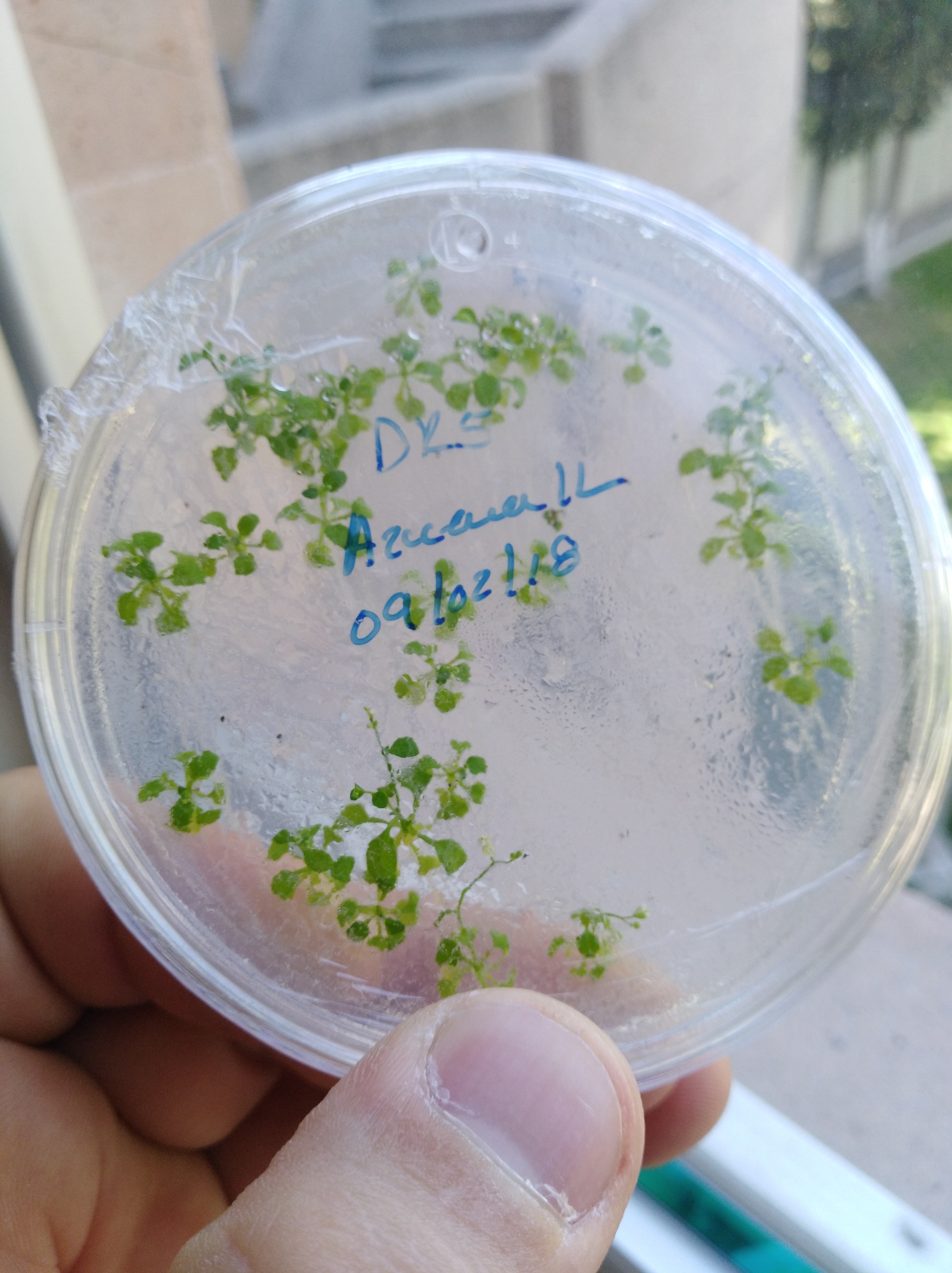
Tissue culture used to regenerate Arabidopsis thaliana

Plants have been engineered for scientific research, to display new flower colors, deliver vaccines, and to create enhanced crops. Many plants are pluripotent, meaning that a single cell from a mature plant can be harvested and under the right conditions can develop into a new plant. This ability can be taken advantage of by genetic engineers; by selecting for cells that have been successfully transformed in an adult plant a new plant can then be grown that contains the transgene in every cell through a process known as tissue culture.

Much of the advances in the field of genetic engineering has come from experimentation with tobacco. Major advances in tissue culture and plant cellular mechanisms for a wide range of plants has originated from systems developed in tobacco. It was the first plant to be altered using genetic engineering and is considered a model organism for not only genetic engineering, but a range of other fields. As such the transgenic tools and procedures are well established making tobacco one of the easiest plants to transform. Another major model organism relevant to genetic engineering is Arabidopsis thaliana. Its small genome and short life cycle makes it easy to manipulate and it contains many homologs to important crop species. It was the first plant sequenced, has a host of online resources available and can be transformed by simply dipping a flower in a transformed Agrobacterium solution.

In research, plants are engineered to help discover the functions of certain genes. The simplest way to do this is to remove the gene and see what phenotype develops compared to the wild type form. Any differences are possibly the result of the missing gene. Unlike mutagenisis, genetic engineering allows targeted removal without disrupting other genes in the organism. Some genes are only expressed in certain tissues, so reporter genes, like GUS, can be attached to the gene of interest allowing visualization of the location. Other ways to test a gene is to alter it slightly and then return it to the plant and see if it still has the same effect on phenotype. Other strategies include attaching the gene to a strong promoter and see what happens when it is overexpressed, forcing a gene to be expressed in a different location or at different developmental stages.

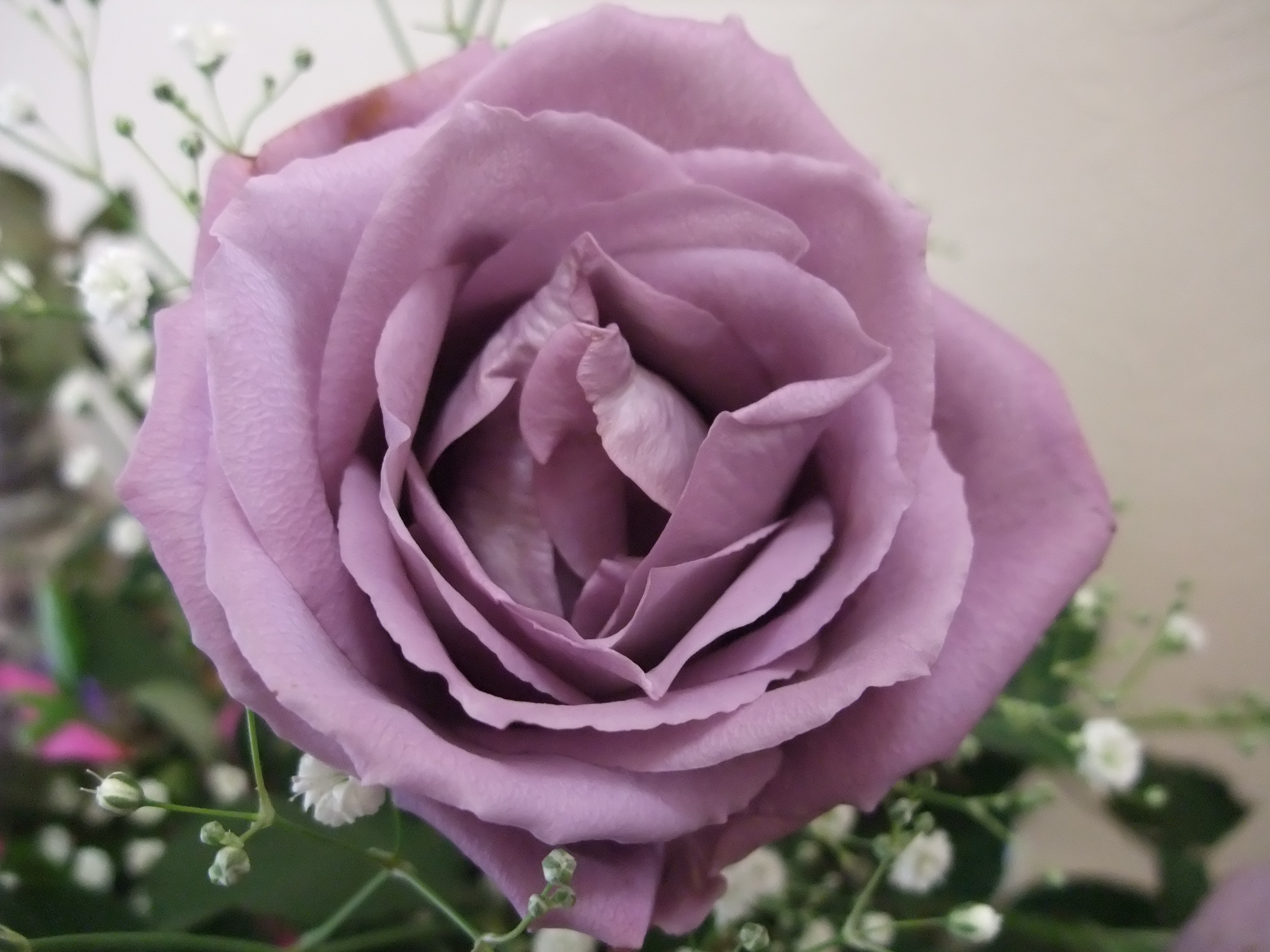
Suntory "blue" rose

Some genetically modified plants are purely ornamental. They are modified for flower color, fragrance, flower shape and plant architecture. The first genetically modified ornamentals commercialized altered color. Carnations were released in 1997, with the most popular genetically modified organism, a blue rose (actually lavender or mauve) created in 2004. The roses are sold in Japan, the United States, and Canada. Other genetically modified ornamentals include Chrysanthemum and Petunia. As well as increasing aesthetic value there are plans to develop ornamentals that use less water or are resistant to the cold, which would allow them to be grown outside their natural environments.

It has been proposed to genetically modify some plant species threatened by extinction to be resistant to invasive plants and diseases, such as the emerald ash borer in North American and the fungal disease, Ceratocystis platani, in European plane trees. The papaya ringspot virus devastated papaya trees in Hawaii in the twentieth century until transgenic papaya plants were given pathogen-derived resistance. However, genetic modification for conservation in plants remains mainly speculative. A unique concern is that a transgenic species may no longer bear enough resemblance to the original species to truly claim that the original species is being conserved. Instead, the transgenic species may be genetically different enough to be considered a new species, thus diminishing the conservation worth of genetic modification.

=== Crops ===
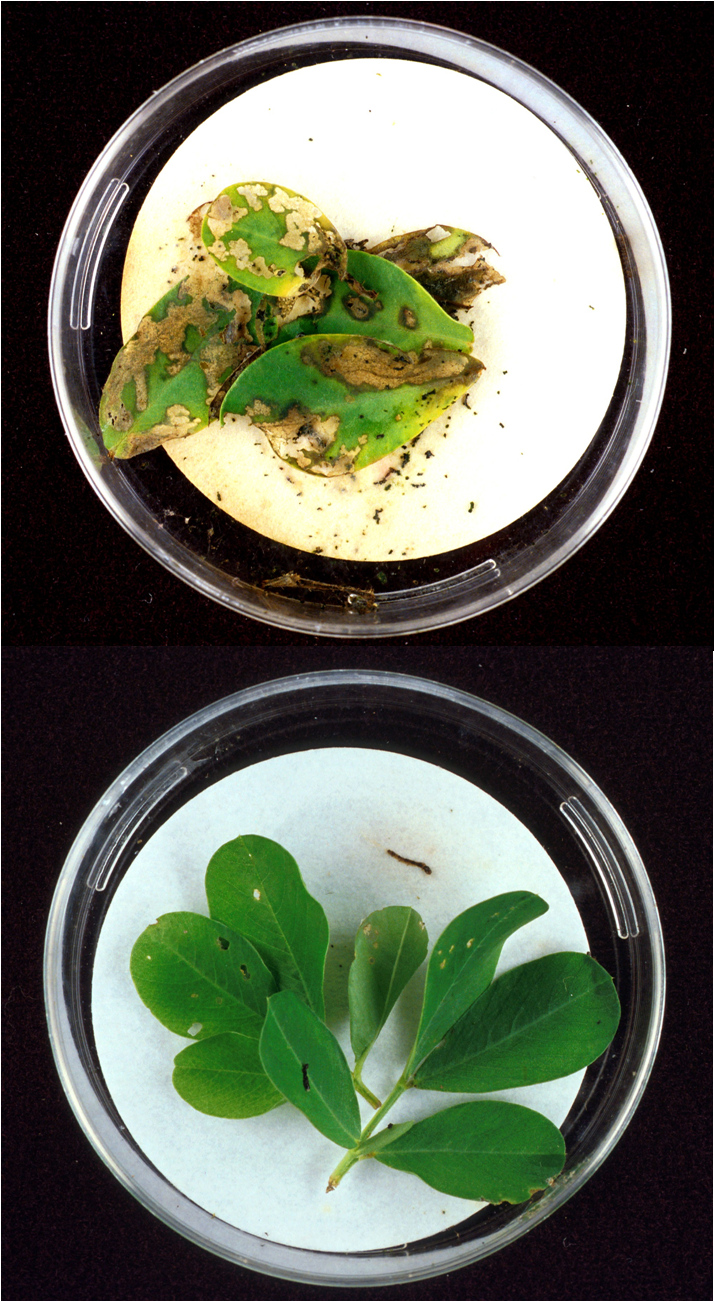
Wild type peanut (top) and transgenic peanut with Bacillus thuringiensis gene added (bottom) exposed to cornstalk borer larva

Genetically modified crops are genetically modified plants that are used in agriculture. The first crops developed were used for animal or human food and provide resistance to certain pests, diseases, environmental conditions, spoilage or chemical treatments (e.g. resistance to a herbicide). The second generation of crops aimed to improve the quality, often by altering the nutrient profile. Third generation genetically modified crops could be used for non-food purposes, including the production of pharmaceutical agents, biofuels, and other industrially useful goods, as well as for bioremediation.

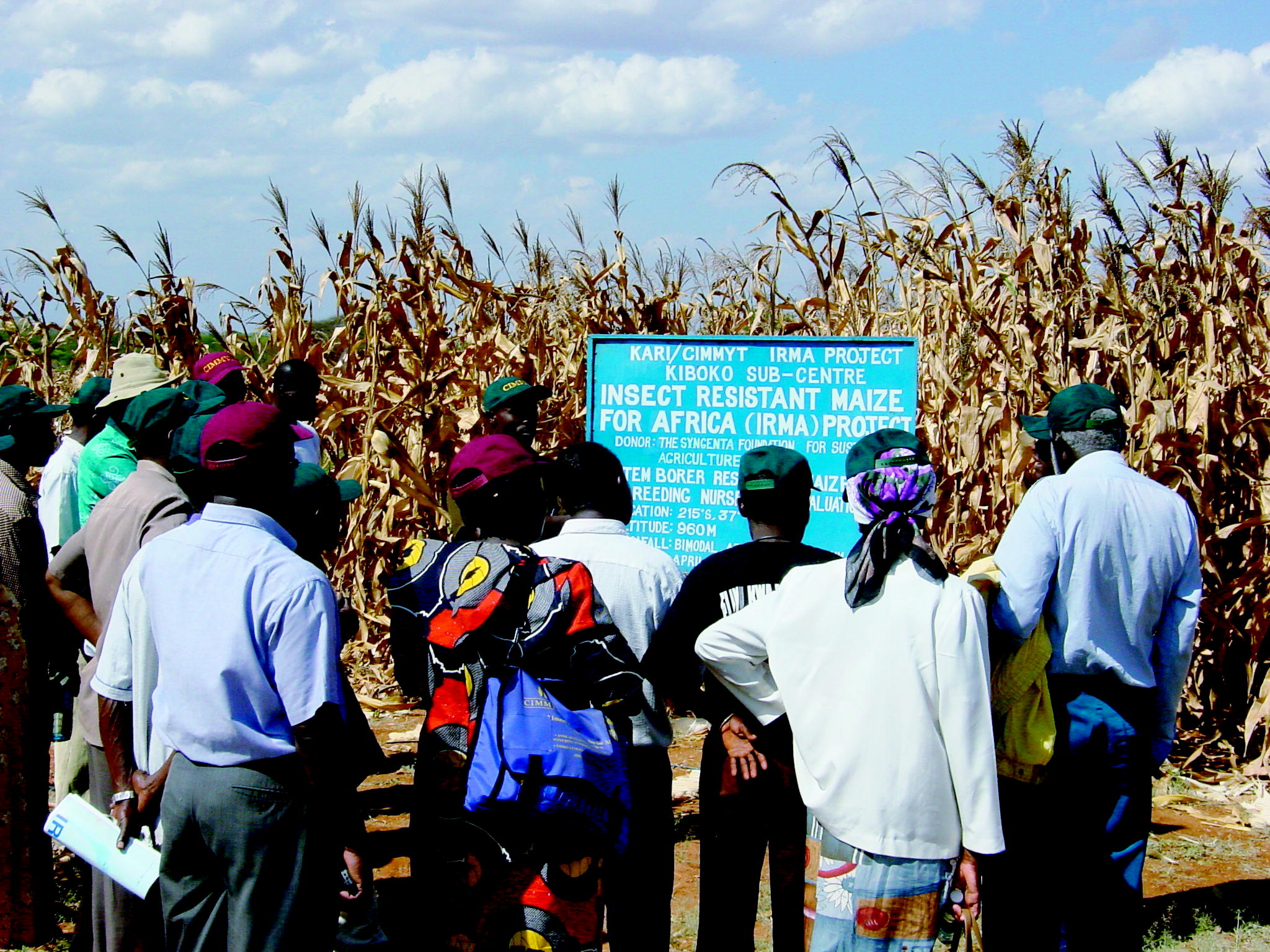
Kenyans examining insect-resistant transgenic Bacillus thuringiensis (Bt) corn

There are three main aims to agricultural advancement; increased production, improved conditions for agricultural workers and sustainability. GM crops contribute by improving harvests through reducing insect pressure, increasing nutrient value and tolerating different abiotic stresses. Despite this potential, as of 2018, the commercialized crops are limited mostly to cash crops like cotton, soybean, maize and canola and the vast majority of the introduced traits provide either herbicide tolerance or insect resistance. Soybeans accounted for half of all genetically modified crops planted in 2014. Adoption by farmers has been rapid, between 1996 and 2013, the total surface area of land cultivated with GM crops increased by a factor of 100. Geographically though the spread has been uneven, with strong growth in the Americas and parts of Asia and little in Europe and Africa. Its socioeconomic spread has been more even, with approximately 54% of worldwide GM crops grown in developing countries in 2013. Although doubts have been raised, most studies have found growing GM crops to be beneficial to farmers through decreased pesticide use as well as increased crop yield and farm profit.

The majority of GM crops have been modified to be resistant to selected herbicides, usually a glyphosate or glufosinate based one. Genetically modified crops engineered to resist herbicides are now more available than conventionally bred resistant varieties; in the USA 93% of soybeans and most of the GM maize grown is glyphosate tolerant. Most currently available genes used to engineer insect resistance come from the Bacillus thuringiensis bacterium and code for delta endotoxins. A few use the genes that encode for vegetative insecticidal proteins. The only gene commercially used to provide insect protection that does not originate from B. thuringiensis is the Cowpea trypsin inhibitor (CpTI). CpTI was first approved for use cotton in 1999 and is currently undergoing trials in rice. Less than one percent of GM crops contained other traits, which include providing virus resistance, delaying senescence and altering the plants composition.

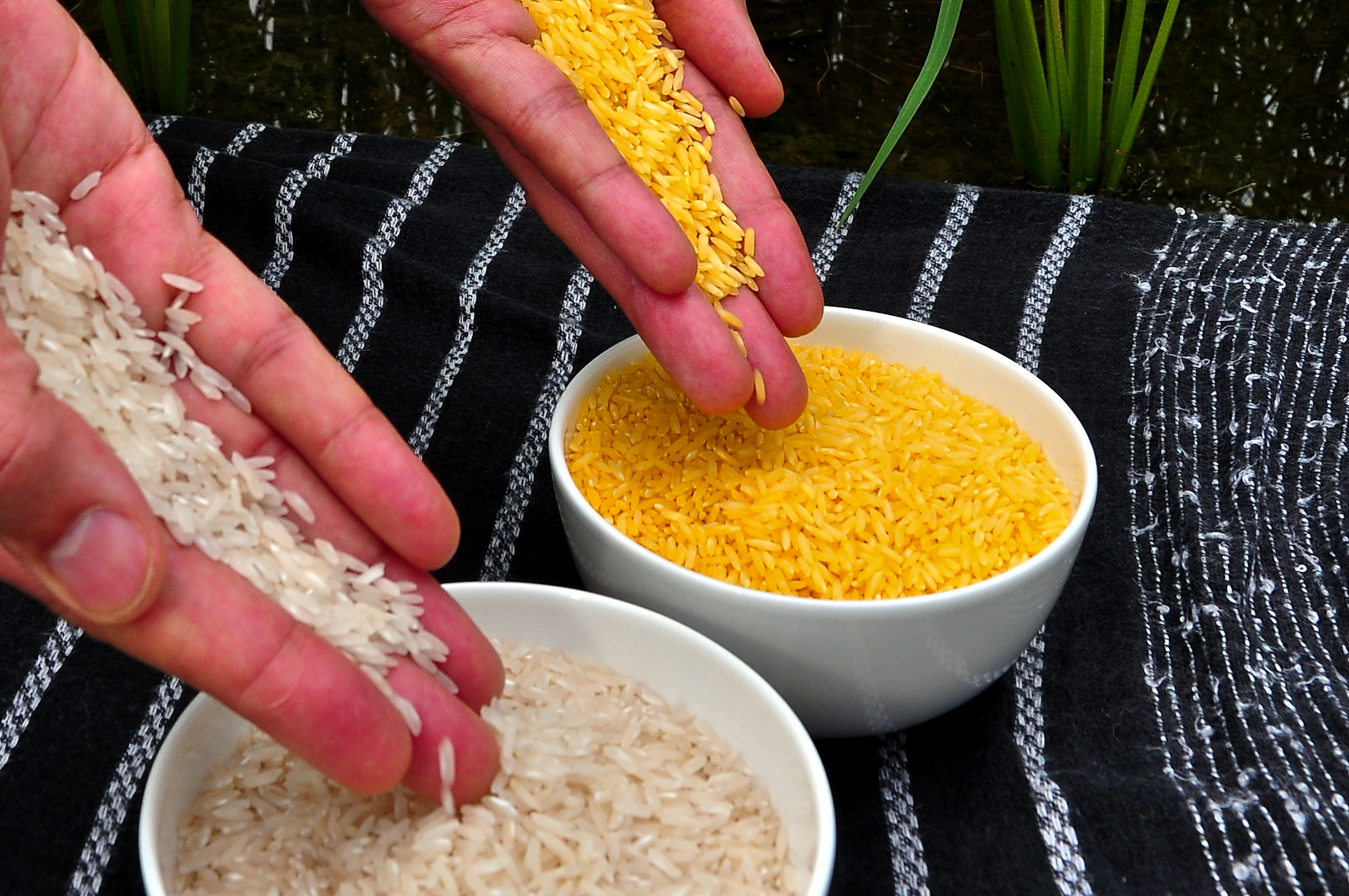
Golden rice compared to white rice

Golden rice is the most well known GM crop that is aimed at increasing nutrient value. It has been engineered with three genes that biosynthesise beta-carotene, a precursor of vitamin A, in the edible parts of rice. It is intended to produce a fortified food to be grown and consumed in areas with a shortage of dietary vitamin A, a deficiency which each year is estimated to kill 670,000 children under the age of 5 and cause an additional 500,000 cases of irreversible childhood blindness. The original golden rice produced 1.6μg/g of the carotenoids, with further development increasing this 23 times. It gained its first approvals for use as food in 2018.

Plants and plant cells have been genetically engineered for production of biopharmaceuticals in bioreactors, a process known as pharming. Work has been done with duckweed Lemna minor, the algae Chlamydomonas reinhardtii and the moss Physcomitrella patens. Biopharmaceuticals produced include cytokines, hormones, antibodies, enzymes and vaccines, most of which are accumulated in the plant seeds. Many drugs also contain natural plant ingredients and the pathways that lead to their production have been genetically altered or transferred to other plant species to produce greater volume. Other options for bioreactors are biopolymers and biofuels. Unlike bacteria, plants can modify the proteins post-translationally, allowing them to make more complex molecules. They also pose less risk of being contaminated. Therapeutics have been cultured in transgenic carrot and tobacco cells, including a drug treatment for Gaucher's disease.

Vaccine production and storage has great potential in transgenic plants. Vaccines are expensive to produce, transport, and administer, so having a system that could produce them locally would allow greater access to poorer and developing areas. As well as purifying vaccines expressed in plants it is also possible to produce edible vaccines in plants. Edible vaccines stimulate the immune system when ingested to protect against certain diseases. Being stored in plants reduces the long-term cost as they can be disseminated without the need for cold storage, don't need to be purified, and have long term stability. Also being housed within plant cells provides some protection from the gut acids upon digestion. However the cost of developing, regulating, and containing transgenic plants is high, leading to most current plant-based vaccine development being applied to veterinary medicine, where the controls are not as strict.

Genetically modified crops have been proposed as one of the ways to reduce farming-related CO_{2} emissions due to higher yield, reduced use of pesticides, reduced use of tractor fuel and no tillage. According to a 2021 study, in EU alone widespread adoption of GE crops would reduce greenhouse gas emissions by 33 million tons of CO_{2} equivalent or 7.5% of total farming-related emissions.

== Animals ==
The vast majority of genetically modified animals are at the research stage with the number close to entering the market remaining small. As of 2018 only three genetically modified animals have been approved, all in the USA. A goat and a chicken have been engineered to produce medicines and a salmon to increase its growth. Despite the differences and difficulties in modifying them, the end aims are much the same as for plants. GM animals are created for research purposes, production of industrial or therapeutic products, agricultural uses, or improving their health. There is also a market for creating genetically modified pets.

=== Mammals ===
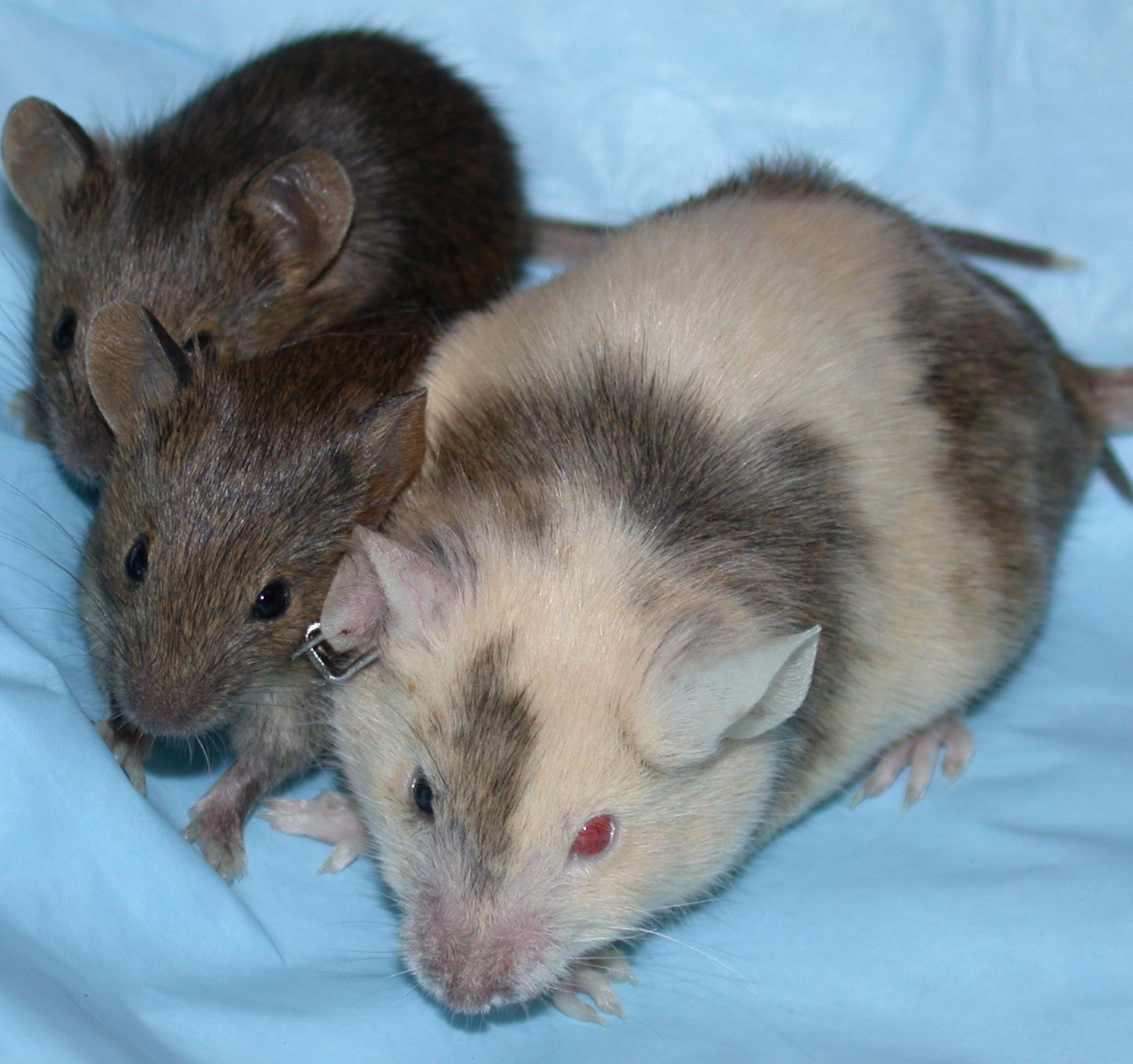
Some chimeras, like the blotched mouse shown, are created through genetic modification techniques like gene targeting.

The process of genetically engineering mammals is slow, tedious, and expensive. However, new technologies are making genetic modifications easier and more precise. The first transgenic mammals were produced by injecting viral DNA into embryos and then implanting the embryos in females. The embryo would develop and it would be hoped that some of the genetic material would be incorporated into the reproductive cells. Then researchers would have to wait until the animal reached breeding age and then offspring would be screened for the presence of the gene in every cell. The development of the CRISPR-Cas9 gene editing system as a cheap and fast way of directly modifying germ cells, effectively halving the amount of time needed to develop genetically modified mammals.

A porcine model of hemophilia A

Mammals are the best models for human disease, making genetic engineered ones vital to the discovery and development of cures and treatments for many serious diseases. Knocking out genes responsible for human genetic disorders allows researchers to study the mechanism of the disease and to test possible cures. Genetically modified mice have been the most common mammals used in biomedical research, as they are cheap and easy to manipulate. Pigs are also a good target as they have a similar body size and anatomical features, physiology, pathophysiological response and diet. Nonhuman primates are the most similar model organisms to humans, but there is less public acceptance towards using them as research animals. In 2009, scientists announced that they had successfully transferred a gene into a primate species (marmosets) for the first time. Their first research target for these marmosets was Parkinson's disease, but they were also considering amyotrophic lateral sclerosis and Huntington's disease.

Human proteins expressed in mammals are more likely to be similar to their natural counterparts than those expressed in plants or microorganisms. Stable expression has been accomplished in sheep, pigs, rats and other animals. In 2009, the first human biological drug produced from such an animal, a goat, was approved. The drug, ATryn, is an anticoagulant which reduces the probability of blood clots during surgery or childbirth and is extracted from the goat's milk. Human alpha-1-antitrypsin is another protein that has been produced from goats and is used in treating humans with this deficiency. Another medicinal area is in creating pigs with greater capacity for human organ transplants (xenotransplantation). Pigs have been genetically modified so that their organs can no longer carry retroviruses or have modifications to reduce the chance of rejection. Chimeric pigs could carry fully human organs. The first human transplant of a genetically modified pig heart occurred in 2023, and kidney in 2024.

Livestock are modified with the intention of improving economically important traits such as growth-rate, quality of meat, milk composition, disease resistance and survival. Animals have been engineered to grow faster, be healthier and resist diseases. Modifications have also improved the wool production of sheep and udder health of cows. Goats have been genetically engineered to produce milk with strong spiderweb-like silk proteins in their milk. A GM pig called Enviropig was created with the capability of digesting plant phosphorus more efficiently than conventional pigs. They could reduce water pollution since they excrete 30 to 70% less phosphorus in manure. Dairy cows have been genetically engineered to produce milk that would be the same as human breast milk. This could potentially benefit mothers who cannot produce breast milk but want their children to have breast milk rather than formula. Researchers have also developed a genetically engineered cow that produces allergy-free milk.

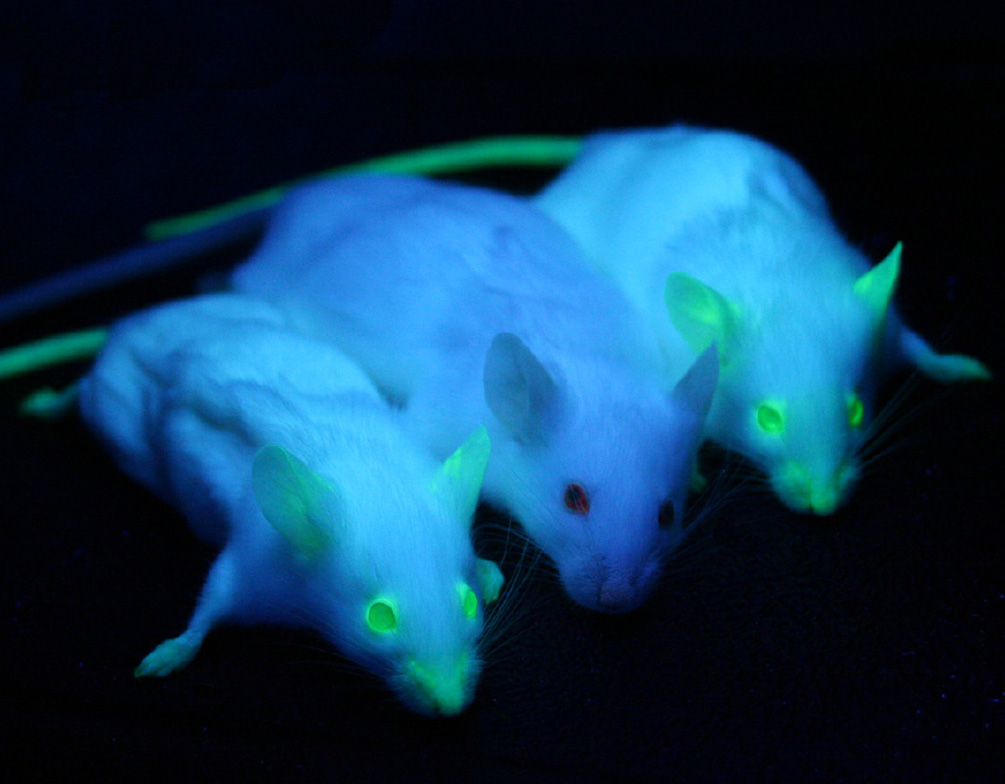
Mice expressing the green fluorescent protein

Scientists have genetically engineered several organisms, including some mammals, to include green fluorescent protein (GFP), for research purposes. GFP and other similar reporting genes allow easy visualization and localization of the products of the genetic modification. Fluorescent pigs have been bred to study human organ transplants, regenerating ocular photoreceptor cells, and other topics. In 2011, green-fluorescent cats were created to help find therapies for HIV/AIDS and other diseases as feline immunodeficiency virus is related to HIV.

There have been suggestions that genetic engineering could be used to bring animals back from extinction. It involves changing the genome of a close living relative to resemble the extinct one and is currently being attempted with the passenger pigeon. Genes associated with the woolly mammoth have been added to the genome of an African Elephant, although the lead researcher says he has no intention of creating live elephants and transferring all the genes and reversing years of genetic evolution is a long way from being feasible. It is more likely that scientists could use this technology to conserve endangered animals by bringing back lost diversity or transferring evolved genetic advantages from adapted organisms to those that are struggling.

==== Humans ====
Gene therapy uses genetically modified viruses to deliver genes which can cure disease in humans. Although gene therapy is still relatively new, it has had some successes. It has been used to treat genetic disorders such as severe combined immunodeficiency, and Leber's congenital amaurosis. Treatments are also being developed for a range of other currently incurable diseases, such as cystic fibrosis, sickle cell anemia, Parkinson's disease, cancer, diabetes, heart disease and muscular dystrophy. These treatments only effect somatic cells, meaning any changes would not be inheritable. Germline gene therapy results in any change being inheritable, which has raised concerns within the scientific community.

In 2015, CRISPR was used to edit the DNA of non-viable human embryos. In November 2018, He Jiankui announced that he had edited the genomes of two human embryos, in an attempt to disable the CCR5 gene, which codes for a receptor that HIV uses to enter cells. He said that twin girls, Lulu and Nana, had been born a few weeks earlier and that they carried functional copies of CCR5 along with disabled CCR5 (mosaicism) and were still vulnerable to HIV. The work was widely condemned as unethical, dangerous, and premature.

=== Fish ===
When exposed to 13 °C water the zebrafish modified to express a carp creatine kinase (right) maintained swimming behavior, while wild type zebrafish (left) could not.

Genetically modified fish are used for scientific research, as pets and as a food source. Aquaculture is a growing industry, currently providing over half the consumed fish worldwide. Through genetic engineering it is possible to increase growth rates, reduce food intake, remove allergenic properties, increase cold tolerance and provide disease resistance. Fish can also be used to detect aquatic pollution or function as bioreactors.

Several groups have been developing zebrafish to detect pollution by attaching fluorescent proteins to genes activated by the presence of pollutants. The fish will then glow and can be used as environmental sensors. The GloFish is a brand of genetically modified fluorescent zebrafish with bright red, green, and orange fluorescent color. It was originally developed by one of the groups to detect pollution, but is now part of the ornamental fish trade, becoming the first genetically modified animal to become publicly available as a pet when in 2003 it was introduced for sale in the USA.

GM fish are widely used in basic research in genetics and development. Two species of fish, zebrafish and medaka, are most commonly modified because they have optically clear chorions (membranes in the egg), rapidly develop, and the one-cell embryo is easy to see and microinject with transgenic DNA. Zebrafish are model organisms for developmental processes, regeneration, genetics, behavior, disease mechanisms and toxicity testing. Their transparency allows researchers to observe developmental stages, intestinal functions and tumour growth. The generation of transgenic protocols (whole organism, cell or tissue specific, tagged with reporter genes) has increased the level of information gained by studying these fish.

GM fish have been developed with promoters driving an over-production of growth hormone for use in the aquaculture industry to increase the speed of development and potentially reduce fishing pressure on wild stocks. This has resulted in dramatic growth enhancement in several species, including salmon, trout and tilapia. AquaBounty Technologies, a biotechnology company, have produced a salmon (called AquAdvantage salmon) that can mature in half the time as wild salmon. It obtained regulatory approval in 2015, the first non-plant GMO food to be commercialized. As of August 2017, GMO salmon is being sold in Canada. Sales in the US started in May 2021.

=== Insects ===
Overexpression of methyl-CpG–binding protein 2 in Drosophila impairs climbing ability (right) compared to the control group (left).

In biological research, transgenic fruit flies (Drosophila melanogaster) are model organisms used to study the effects of genetic changes on development. Fruit flies are often preferred over other animals due to their short life cycle and low maintenance requirements. They also have a relatively simple genome compared to many vertebrates, with typically only one copy of each gene, making phenotypic analysis easy. Drosophila have been used to study genetics and inheritance, embryonic development, learning, behavior, and aging. The discovery of transposons, in particular the p-element, in Drosophila provided an early method to add transgenes to their genome, although this has been taken over by more modern gene-editing techniques.

Due to their significance to human health, scientists are looking at ways to control mosquitoes through genetic engineering. Malaria-resistant mosquitoes have been developed in the laboratory by inserting a gene that reduces the development of the malaria parasite and then use homing endonucleases to rapidly spread that gene throughout the male population (known as a gene drive). This approach has been taken further by using the gene drive to spread a lethal gene. In trials the populations of Aedes aegypti mosquitoes, the single most important carrier of dengue fever and Zika virus, were reduced by between 80% and by 90%. Another approach is to use a sterile insect technique, whereby males genetically engineered to be sterile out compete viable males, to reduce population numbers.

Other insect pests that make attractive targets are moths. Diamondback moths cause US$4 to $5 billion of damage each year worldwide. The approach is similar to the sterile technique tested on mosquitoes, where males are transformed with a gene that prevents any females born from reaching maturity. They underwent field trials in 2017. Genetically modified moths have previously been released in field trials. In this case a strain of pink bollworm that were sterilized with radiation were genetically engineered to express a red fluorescent protein making it easier for researchers to monitor them.

Silkworm, the larvae stage of Bombyx mori, is an economically important insect in sericulture. Scientists are developing strategies to enhance silk quality and quantity. There is also potential to use the silk producing machinery to make other valuable proteins. Proteins currently developed to be expressed by silkworms include; human serum albumin, human collagen α-chain, mouse monoclonal antibody and N-glycanase. Silkworms have been created that produce spider silk, a stronger but extremely difficult to harvest silk, and even novel silks.

=== Other ===
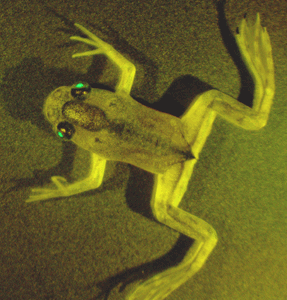
Frog expressing green fluorescent protein

Systems have been developed to create transgenic organisms in a wide variety of other animals. Chickens have been genetically modified for a variety of purposes. This includes studying embryo development, preventing the transmission of bird flu and providing evolutionary insights using reverse engineering to recreate dinosaur-like phenotypes. A GM chicken that produces the drug Kanuma, an enzyme that treats a rare condition, in its egg passed US regulatory approval in 2015. Genetically modified frogs, in particular Xenopus laevis and Xenopus tropicalis, are used in developmental biology research. GM frogs can also be used as pollution sensors, especially for endocrine disrupting chemicals. There are proposals to use genetic engineering to control cane toads in Australia.

The nematode Caenorhabditis elegans is one of the major model organisms for researching molecular biology. RNA interference (RNAi) was discovered in C. elegans and could be induced by simply feeding them bacteria modified to express double stranded RNA. It is also relatively easy to produce stable transgenic nematodes and this along with RNAi are the major tools used in studying their genes. The most common use of transgenic nematodes has been studying gene expression and localization by attaching reporter genes. Transgenes can also be combined with RNAi techniques to rescue phenotypes, study gene function, image cell development in real time or control expression for different tissues or developmental stages. Transgenic nematodes have been used to study viruses, toxicology, diseases, and to detect environmental pollutants.

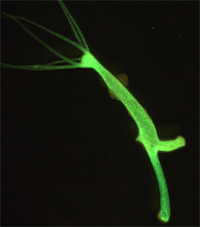
Transgenic Hydra expressing green fluorescent protein

The gene responsible for albinism in sea cucumbers has been found and used to engineer white sea cucumbers, a rare delicacy. The technology also opens the way to investigate the genes responsible for some of the cucumbers more unusual traits, including hibernating in summer, eviscerating their intestines, and dissolving their bodies upon death. Flatworms have the ability to regenerate themselves from a single cell. Until 2017 there was no effective way to transform them, which hampered research. By using microinjection and radiation scientists have now created the first genetically modified flatworms. The bristle worm, a marine annelid, has been modified. It is of interest due to its reproductive cycle being synchronized with lunar phases, regeneration capacity and slow evolution rate. Cnidaria such as Hydra and the sea anemone Nematostella vectensis are attractive model organisms to study the evolution of immunity and certain developmental processes. Other animals that have been genetically modified include snails, geckos, turtles, crayfish, oysters, shrimp, clams, abalone and sponges.

== Chromists ==
If defined monophyletically, the Chromista (Ochrophytes) are a diverse group of algae containing economically important organisms such as diatoms and kelp

=== Brown algae ===
4 brown algae:

- Ectocarpus sp.
- Scytosiphon promiscuus
- Laminaria digitata (Oarweed)
- Undaria pinnatifida (Wakame)

Saccharina japonica (Sweet kelp)

=== Diatoms ===
Phaeodactylum tricornutum

Thalassiosira pseudonana

Chaetoceros muelleri

=== Eustigmatophytes ===
Nannochloropsis oceanica

== Fungi ==
Fungi can be used for many of the same processes as bacteria. For industrial applications, yeasts combine the bacterial advantages of being a single-celled organism that is easy to manipulate and grow with the advanced protein modifications found in eukaryotes. They can be used to produce large complex molecules for use in food, pharmaceuticals, hormones, and steroids. Yeast is important for wine production and as of 2016 two genetically modified yeasts involved in the fermentation of wine have been commercialized in the United States and Canada. One has increased malolactic fermentation efficiency, while the other prevents the production of dangerous ethyl carbamate compounds during fermentation. There have also been advances in the production of biofuel from genetically modified fungi.

Fungi, being the most common pathogens of insects, make attractive biopesticides. Unlike bacteria and viruses they have the advantage of infecting the insects by contact alone, although they are out competed in efficiency by chemical pesticides. Genetic engineering can improve virulence, usually by adding more virulent proteins, increasing infection rate or enhancing spore persistence. Many of the disease carrying vectors are susceptible to entomopathogenic fungi. An attractive target for biological control are mosquitos, vectors for a range of deadly diseases, including malaria, yellow fever and dengue fever. Mosquitos can evolve quickly so it becomes a balancing act of killing them before the Plasmodium they carry becomes the infectious disease, but not so fast that they become resistant to the fungi. By genetically engineering fungi like Metarhizium anisopliae and Beauveria bassiana to delay the development of mosquito infectiousness the selection pressure to evolve resistance is reduced. Another strategy is to add proteins to the fungi that block transmission of malaria or remove the Plasmodium altogether.

Agaricus bisporus the common white button mushroom, has been gene edited to resist browning, giving it a longer shelf life. The process used CRISPR to knock out a gene that encodes polyphenol oxidase. As it didn't introduce any foreign DNA into the organism it was not deemed to be regulated under existing GMO frameworks and as such is the first CRISPR-edited organism to be approved for release. This has intensified debates as to whether gene-edited organisms should be considered genetically modified organisms and how they should be regulated.

== Bacteria ==
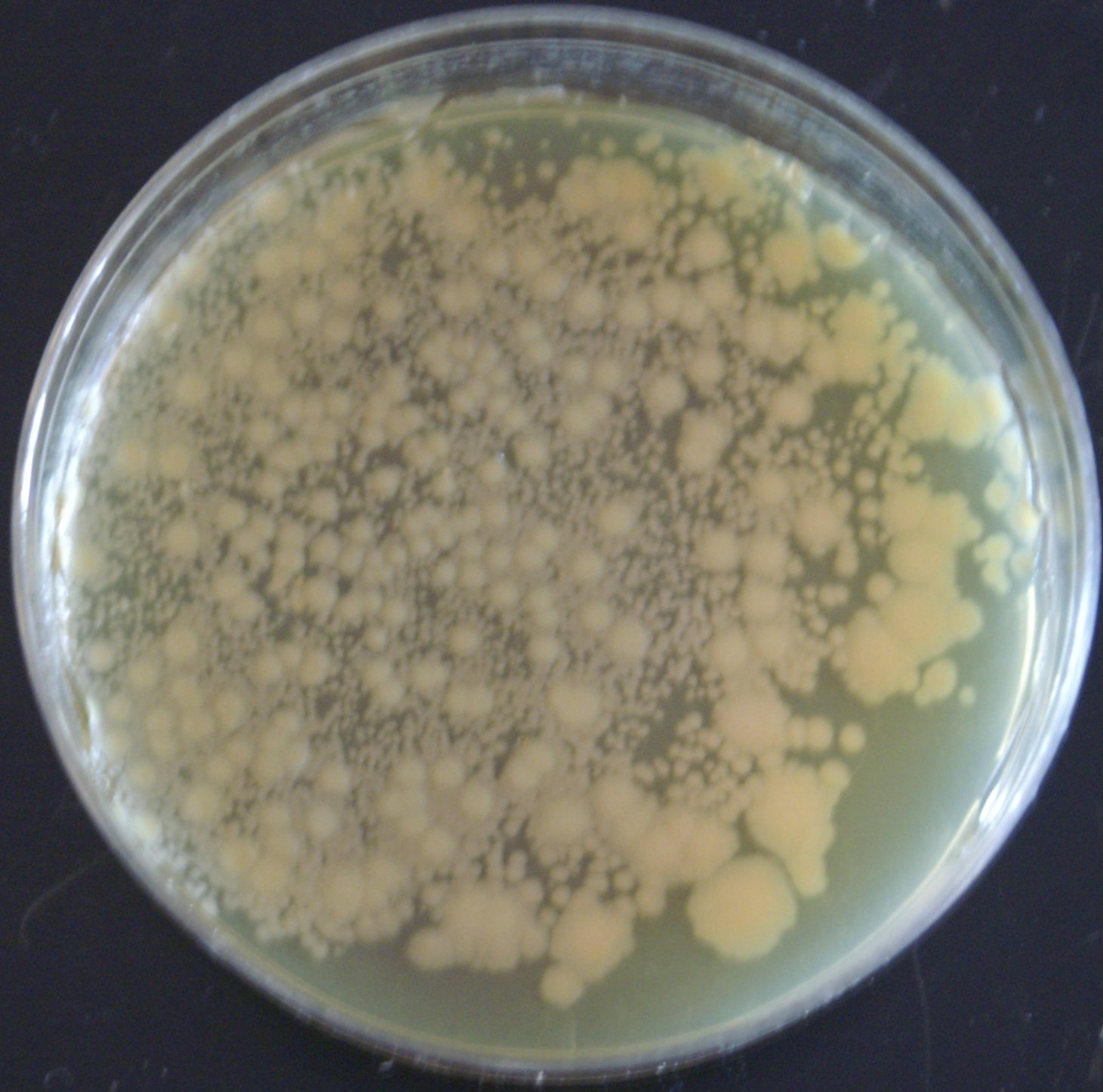
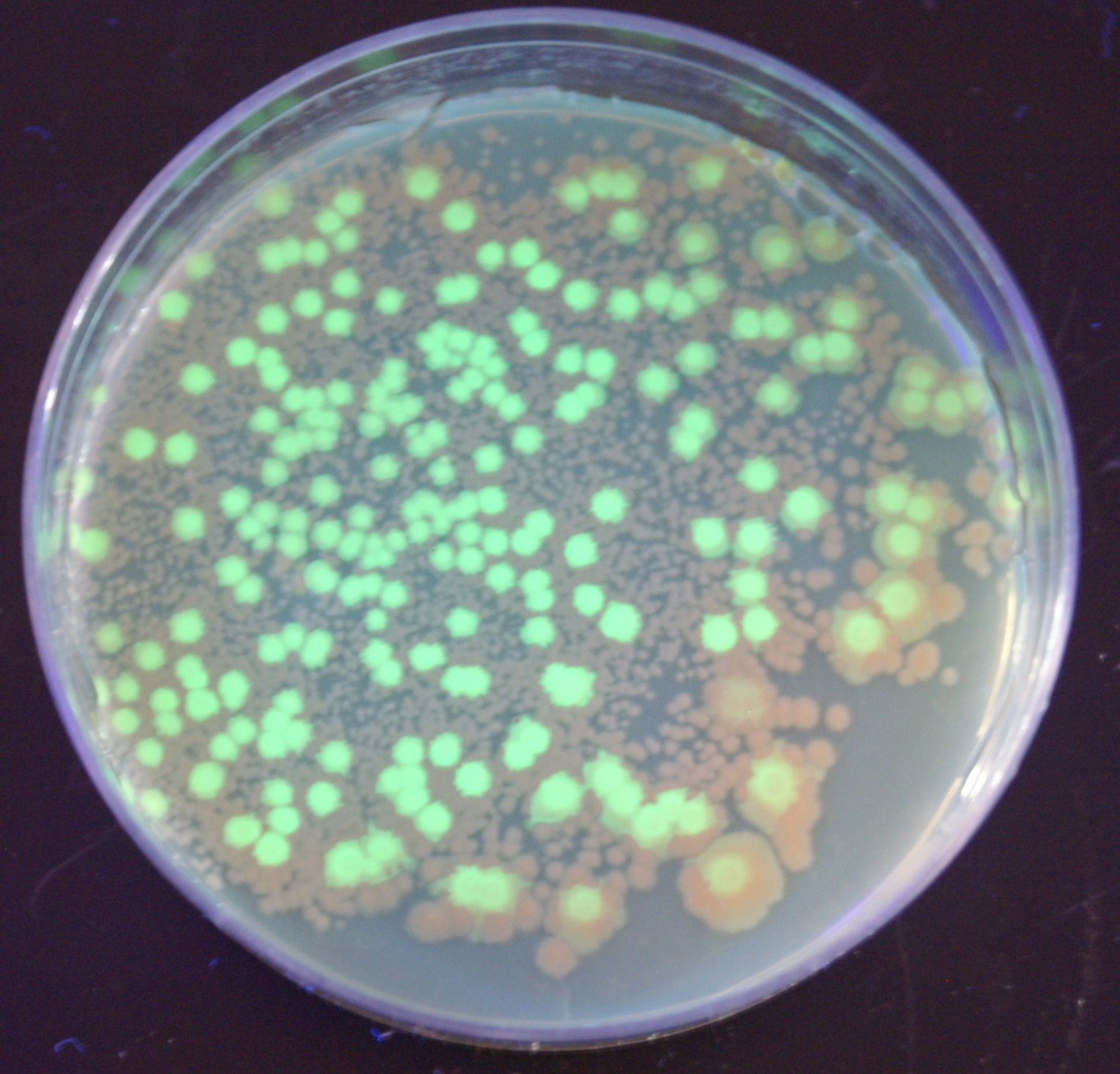
Left: Bacteria transformed with pGLO under ambient light
Right: Bacteria transformed with pGLO visualized under ultraviolet light

Bacteria were the first organisms to be genetically modified in the laboratory, due to the relative ease of modifying their chromosomes. This ease made them important tools for the creation of other GMOs. Genes and other genetic information from a wide range of organisms can be added to a plasmid and inserted into bacteria for storage and modification. Bacteria are cheap, easy to grow, clonal, multiply quickly and can be stored at −80 °C almost indefinitely. Once a gene is isolated it can be stored inside the bacteria, providing an unlimited supply for research. A large number of custom plasmids make manipulating DNA extracted from bacteria relatively easy.

Their ease of use has made them great tools for scientists looking to study gene function and evolution. The simplest model organisms come from bacteria, with most of our early understanding of molecular biology coming from studying Escherichia coli. Scientists can easily manipulate and combine genes within the bacteria to create novel or disrupted proteins and observe the effect this has on various molecular systems. Researchers have combined the genes from bacteria and archaea, leading to insights on how these two diverged in the past. In the field of synthetic biology, they have been used to test various synthetic approaches, from synthesizing genomes to creating novel nucleotides.

Bacteria have been used in the production of food for a long time, and specific strains have been developed and selected for that work on an industrial scale. They can be used to produce enzymes, amino acids, flavorings, and other compounds used in food production. With the advent of genetic engineering, new genetic changes can easily be introduced into these bacteria. Most food-producing bacteria are lactic acid bacteria, and this is where the majority of research into genetically engineering food-producing bacteria has gone. The bacteria can be modified to operate more efficiently, reduce toxic byproduct production, increase output, create improved compounds, and remove unnecessary pathways. Food products from genetically modified bacteria include alpha-amylase, which converts starch to simple sugars, chymosin, which clots milk protein for cheese making, and pectinesterase, which improves fruit juice clarity. The majority are produced in the US and even though regulations are in place to allow production in Europe, as of 2015 no food products derived from bacteria are currently available there.

Genetically modified bacteria are used to produce large amounts of proteins for industrial use. The bacteria are generally grown to a large volume before the gene encoding the protein is activated. The bacteria are then harvested and the desired protein purified from them. The high cost of extraction and purification has meant that only high value products have been produced at an industrial scale. The majority of these products are human proteins for use in medicine. Many of these proteins are impossible or difficult to obtain via natural methods and they are less likely to be contaminated with pathogens, making them safer. The first medicinal use of GM bacteria was to produce the protein insulin to treat diabetes. Other medicines produced include clotting factors to treat hemophilia, human growth hormone to treat various forms of dwarfism, interferon to treat some cancers, erythropoietin for anemic patients, and tissue plasminogen activator which dissolves blood clots. Outside of medicine they have been used to produce biofuels. There is interest in developing an extracellular expression system within the bacteria to reduce costs and make the production of more products economical.

With a greater understanding of the role that the microbiome plays in human health, there is a potential to treat diseases by genetically altering the bacteria to, themselves, be therapeutic agents. Ideas include altering gut bacteria so they destroy harmful bacteria, or using bacteria to replace or increase deficient enzymes or proteins. One research focus is to modify Lactobacillus, bacteria that naturally provide some protection against HIV, with genes that will further enhance this protection. If the bacteria do not form colonies inside the patient, the person must repeatedly ingest the modified bacteria in order to get the required doses. Enabling the bacteria to form a colony could provide a more long-term solution, but could also raise safety concerns as interactions between bacteria and the human body are less well understood than with traditional drugs. There are concerns that horizontal gene transfer to other bacteria could have unknown effects. As of 2018 there are clinical trials underway testing the efficacy and safety of these treatments.

For over a century, bacteria have been used in agriculture. Crops have been inoculated with Rhizobia (and more recently Azospirillum) to increase their production or to allow them to be grown outside their original habitat. Application of Bacillus thuringiensis (Bt) and other bacteria can help protect crops from insect infestation and plant diseases. With advances in genetic engineering, these bacteria have been manipulated for increased efficiency and expanded host range. Markers have also been added to aid in tracing the spread of the bacteria. The bacteria that naturally colonize certain crops have also been modified, in some cases to express the Bt genes responsible for pest resistance. Pseudomonas strains of bacteria cause frost damage by nucleating water into ice crystals around themselves. This led to the development of ice-minus bacteria, which have the ice-forming genes removed. When applied to crops they can compete with the non-modified bacteria and confer some frost resistance.

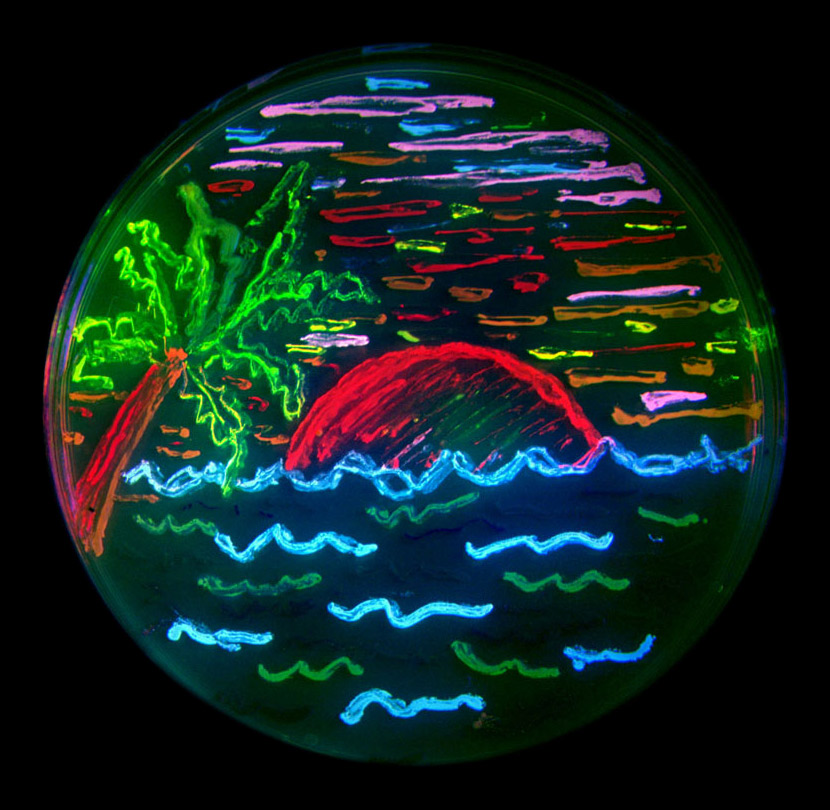
This artwork is made with bacteria modified to express 8 different colors of fluorescent proteins.

Other uses for genetically modified bacteria include bioremediation, where the bacteria are used to convert pollutants into a less toxic form. Genetic engineering can increase the levels of the enzymes used to degrade a toxin or to make the bacteria more stable under environmental conditions. Bioart has also been created using genetically modified bacteria. In the 1980s artist Jon Davis and geneticist Dana Boyd converted the Germanic symbol for femininity (ᛉ) into binary code and then into a DNA sequence, which was then expressed in Escherichia coli. This was taken a step further in 2012, when a whole book was encoded onto DNA. Paintings have also been produced using bacteria transformed with fluorescent proteins.

== Viruses ==
Viruses are often modified so they can be used as vectors for inserting genetic information into other organisms. This process is called transduction and if successful the recipient of the introduced DNA becomes a GMO. Different viruses have different efficiencies and capabilities. Researchers can use this to control for various factors; including the target location, insert size, and duration of gene expression. Any dangerous sequences inherent in the virus must be removed, while those that allow the gene to be delivered effectively are retained.

While viral vectors can be used to insert DNA into almost any organism it is especially relevant for its potential in treating human disease. Although primarily still at trial stages, there has been some successes using gene therapy to replace defective genes. This is most evident in curing patients with severe combined immunodeficiency rising from adenosine deaminase deficiency (ADA-SCID), although the development of leukemia in some ADA-SCID patients along with the death of Jesse Gelsinger in a 1999 trial set back the development of this approach for many years. In 2009, another breakthrough was achieved when an eight-year-old boy with Leber's congenital amaurosis regained normal eyesight and in 2016 GlaxoSmithKline gained approval to commercialize a gene therapy treatment for ADA-SCID. As of 2018, there are a substantial number of clinical trials underway, including treatments for hemophilia, glioblastoma, chronic granulomatous disease, cystic fibrosis and various cancers.

The most common virus used for gene delivery comes from adenoviruses as they can carry up to 7.5 kb of foreign DNA and infect a relatively broad range of host cells, although they have been known to elicit immune responses in the host and only provide short term expression. Other common vectors are adeno-associated viruses, which have lower toxicity and longer-term expression, but can only carry about 4kb of DNA. Herpes simplex viruses make promising vectors, having a carrying capacity of over 30kb and providing long term expression, although they are less efficient at gene delivery than other vectors. The best vectors for long term integration of the gene into the host genome are retroviruses, but their propensity for random integration is problematic. Lentiviruses are a part of the same family as retroviruses with the advantage of infecting both dividing and non-dividing cells, whereas retroviruses only target dividing cells. Other viruses that have been used as vectors include alphaviruses, flaviviruses, measles viruses, rhabdoviruses, Newcastle disease virus, poxviruses, and picornaviruses.

Most vaccines consist of viruses that have been attenuated, disabled, weakened or killed in some way so that their virulent properties are no longer effective. Genetic engineering could theoretically be used to create viruses with the virulent genes removed. This does not affect the viruses infectivity, invokes a natural immune response and there is no chance that they will regain their virulence function, which can occur with some other vaccines. As such they are generally considered safer and more efficient than conventional vaccines, although concerns remain over non-target infection, potential side effects and horizontal gene transfer to other viruses. Another potential approach is to use vectors to create novel vaccines for diseases that have no vaccines available or the vaccines that do not work effectively, such as AIDS, malaria, and tuberculosis. The most effective vaccine against Tuberculosis, the Bacillus Calmette–Guérin (BCG) vaccine, only provides partial protection. A modified vaccine expressing a M tuberculosis antigen is able to enhance BCG protection. It has been shown to be safe to use at phase II trials, although not as effective as initially hoped. Other vector-based vaccines have already been approved and many more are being developed.

Another potential use of genetically modified viruses is to alter them so they can directly treat diseases. This can be through expression of protective proteins or by directly targeting infected cells. In 2004, researchers reported that a genetically modified virus that exploits the selfish behavior of cancer cells might offer an alternative way of killing tumours. Since then, several researchers have developed genetically modified oncolytic viruses that show promise as treatments for various types of cancer. In 2017, researchers genetically modified a virus to express spinach defensin proteins. The virus was injected into orange trees to combat citrus greening disease that had reduced orange production by 70% since 2005.

Natural viral diseases, such as myxomatosis and rabbit hemorrhagic disease, have been used to help control pest populations. Over time the surviving pests become resistant, leading researchers to look at alternative methods. Genetically modified viruses that make the target animals infertile through immunocontraception have been created in the laboratory as well as others that target the developmental stage of the animal. There are concerns with using this approach regarding virus containment and cross species infection. Sometimes the same virus can be modified for contrasting purposes. Genetic modification of the myxoma virus has been proposed to conserve European wild rabbits in the Iberian peninsula and to help regulate them in Australia. To protect the Iberian species from viral diseases, the myxoma virus was genetically modified to immunize the rabbits, while in Australia the same myxoma virus was genetically modified to lower fertility in the Australian rabbit population.

Outside of biology scientists have used a genetically modified virus to construct a lithium-ion battery and other nanostructured materials. It is possible to engineer bacteriophages to express modified proteins on their surface and join them up in specific patterns (a technique called phage display). These structures have potential uses for energy storage and generation, biosensing and tissue regeneration with some new materials currently produced including quantum dots, liquid crystals, nanorings and nanofibres. The battery was made by engineering M13 bacteriaophages so they would coat themselves in iron phosphate and then assemble themselves along a carbon nanotube. This created a highly conductive medium for use in a cathode, allowing energy to be transferred quickly. They could be constructed at lower temperatures with non-toxic chemicals, making them more environmentally friendly.

== Regulation ==
Genetically modified organisms are regulated by government agencies. This applies to research as well as the release of genetically modified organisms, including crops and food. The development of a regulatory framework concerning genetic engineering began in 1975, at Asilomar, California. The Asilomar meeting recommended a set of guidelines regarding the cautious use of recombinant technology and any products resulting from that technology. The Cartagena Protocol on Biosafety was adopted on 29 January 2000 and entered into force on 11 September 2003. It is an international treaty that governs the transfer, handling, and use of genetically modified organisms. One hundred and fifty-seven countries are members of the Protocol and many use it as a reference point for their own regulations.

Universities and research institutes generally have a special committee that is responsible for approving any experiments that involve genetic engineering. Many experiments also need permission from a national regulatory group or legislation. All staff must be trained in the use of GMOs and all laboratories must gain approval from their regulatory agency to work with GMOs. The legislation covering GMOs are often derived from regulations and guidelines in place for the non-GMO version of the organism, although they are more severe. There is a near-universal system for assessing the relative risks associated with GMOs and other agents to laboratory staff and the community. They are assigned to one of four risk categories based on their virulence, the severity of the disease, the mode of transmission, and the availability of preventive measures or treatments. There are four biosafety levels that a laboratory can fall into, ranging from level 1 (which is suitable for working with agents not associated with disease) to level 4 (working with life-threatening agents). Different countries use different nomenclature to describe the levels and can have different requirements for what can be done at each level.

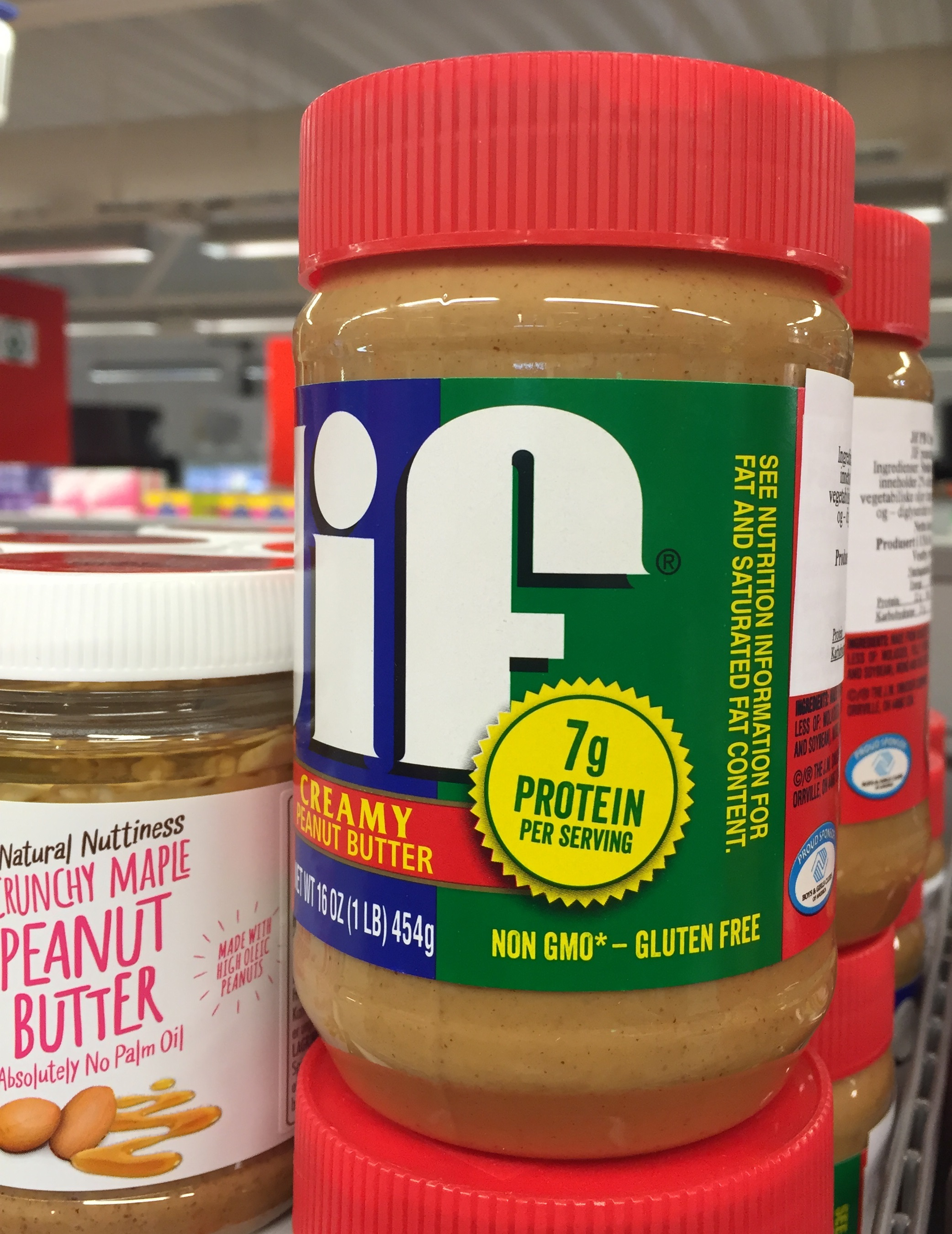
A label marking this peanut butter as being non-GMO

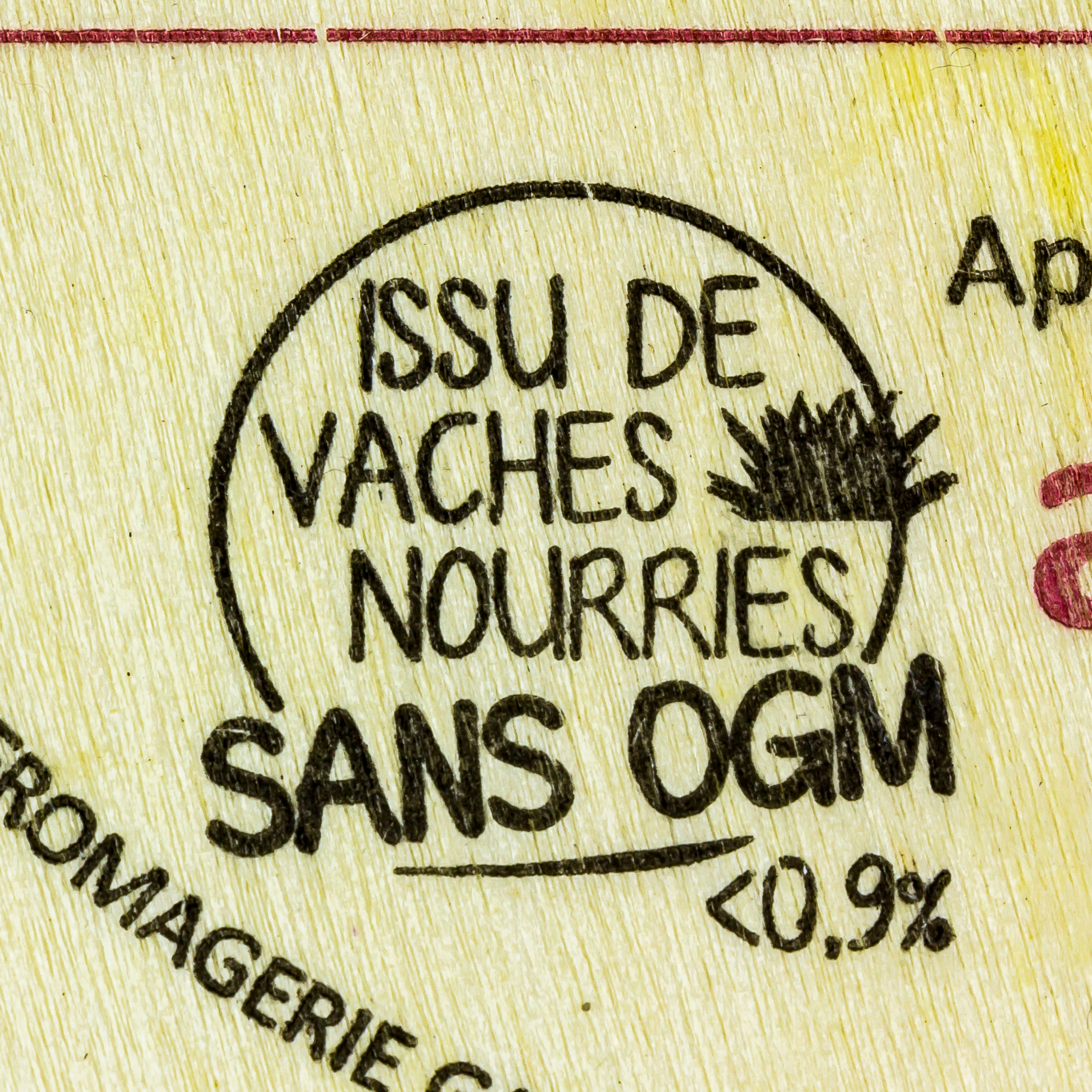
Detail of a French cheese box declaring "GMO-free" production (i.e., below 0.9%)

There are differences in the regulation for the release of GMOs between countries, with some of the most marked differences occurring between the US and Europe. Regulation varies in a given country depending on the intended use of the products of the genetic engineering. For example, a crop not intended for food use is generally not reviewed by authorities responsible for food safety. Some nations have banned the release of GMOs or restricted their use, and others permit them with widely differing degrees of regulation. In 2016, thirty eight countries officially ban or prohibit the cultivation of GMOs and nine (Algeria, Bhutan, Kenya, Kyrgyzstan, Madagascar, Peru, Russia, Venezuela and Zimbabwe) ban their importation. Most countries that do not allow GMO cultivation do permit research using GMOs. Despite regulation, illegal releases have sometimes occurred, due to weakness of enforcement.

The European Union (EU) differentiates between approval for cultivation within the EU and approval for import and processing. While only a few GMOs have been approved for cultivation in the EU a number of GMOs have been approved for import and processing. The cultivation of GMOs has triggered a debate about the market for GMOs in Europe. Depending on the coexistence regulations, incentives for cultivation of GM crops differ. The US policy does not focus on the process as much as other countries, looks at verifiable scientific risks and uses the concept of substantial equivalence. Whether gene edited organisms should be regulated the same as genetically modified organism is debated. USA regulations sees them as separate and does not regulate them under the same conditions, while in Europe a GMO is any organism created using genetic engineering techniques.

One of the key issues concerning regulators is whether GM products should be labeled. The European Commission says that mandatory labeling and traceability are needed to allow for informed choice, avoid potential false advertising and facilitate the withdrawal of products if adverse effects on health or the environment are discovered. The American Medical Association and the American Association for the Advancement of Science say that absent scientific evidence of harm even voluntary labeling is misleading and will falsely alarm consumers. Labeling of GMO products in the marketplace is required in 64 countries. Labeling can be mandatory up to a threshold GM content level (which varies between countries) or voluntary. In the U.S., the National Bioengineered Food Disclosure Standard (Mandatory Compliance Date: January 1, 2022) requires labeling GM foods. In Canada, labeling of GM food is voluntary, while in Europe all food (including processed food) or feed which contains greater than 0.9% of approved GMOs must be labeled. In 2014, sales of products that had been labeled as non-GMO grew 30 percent to $1.1 billion.

== Controversy ==
There is controversy over GMOs, especially with regard to their release outside laboratory environments. The dispute involves consumers, producers, biotechnology companies, governmental regulators, non-governmental organizations, and scientists. Many of these concerns involve GM crops and whether food produced from them is safe and what impact growing them will have on the environment. These controversies have led to litigation, international trade disputes, and protests, and to restrictive regulation of commercial products in some countries. Most concerns are around the health and environmental effects of GMOs. These include whether they may provoke an allergic reaction, whether the transgenes could transfer to human cells, and whether genes not approved for human consumption could outcross into the food supply.

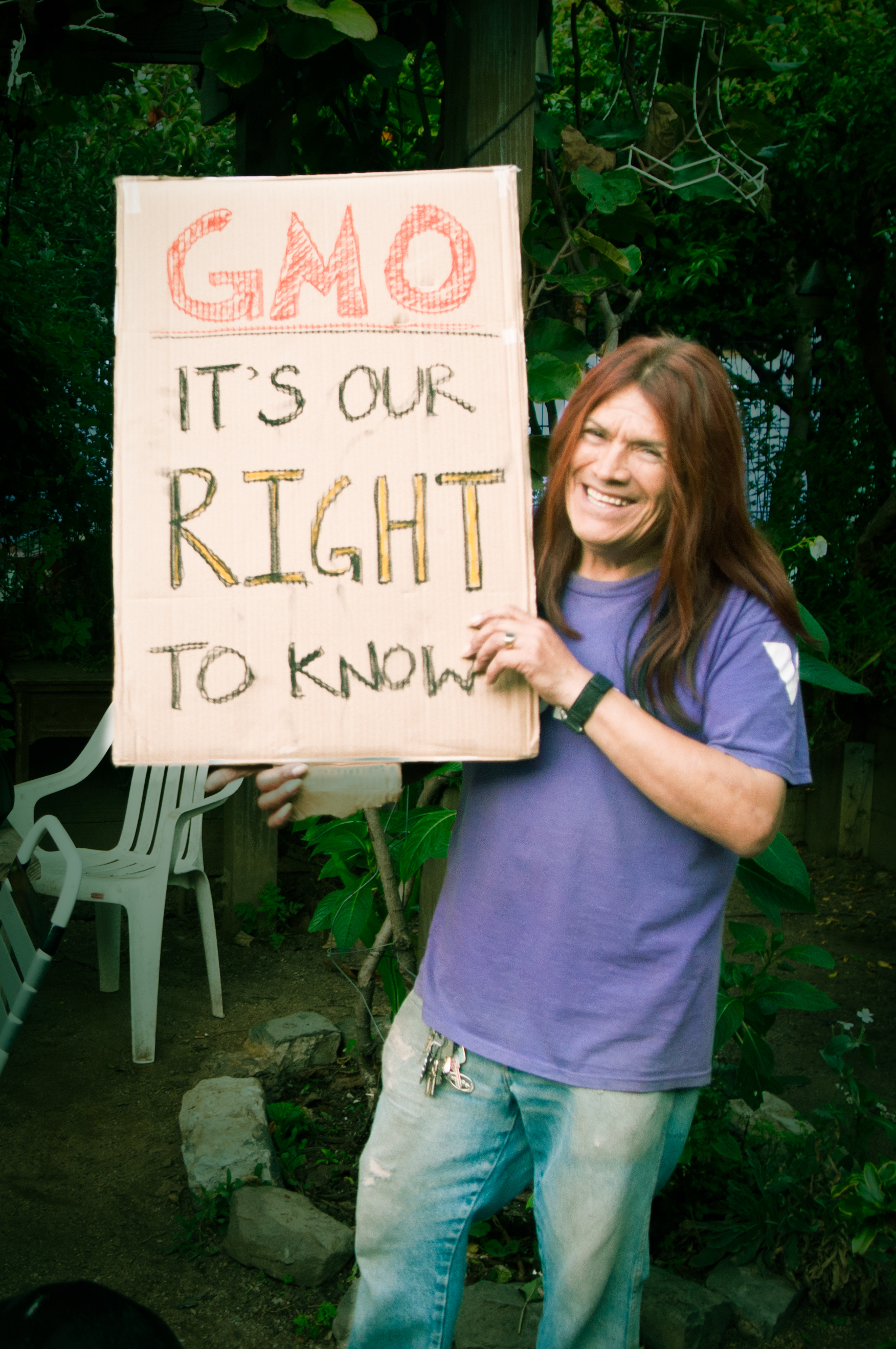
A protester advocating for the labeling of GMOs

There is a scientific consensus that currently available food derived from GM crops poses no greater risk to human health than conventional food, but that each GM food needs to be tested on a case-by-case basis before introduction. Nonetheless, members of the public are much less likely than scientists to perceive GM foods as safe. The legal and regulatory status of GM foods varies by country, with some nations banning or restricting them, and others permitting them with widely differing degrees of regulation.

As late as the 1990s gene flow into wild populations was thought to be unlikely and rare, and if it were to occur, easily eradicated. It was thought that this would add no additional environmental costs or risks – no effects were expected other than those already caused by pesticide applications. However, in the decades since, several such examples have been observed. Gene flow between GM crops and compatible plants, along with increased use of broad-spectrum herbicides, can increase the risk of herbicide resistant weed populations. Debate over the extent and consequences of gene flow intensified in 2001 when a paper was published showing transgenes had been found in landrace maize in Mexico, the crop's center of diversity. Gene flow from GM crops to other organisms has been found to generally be lower than what would occur naturally. In order to address some of these concerns some GMOs have been developed with traits to help control their spread. To prevent the genetically modified salmon inadvertently breeding with wild salmon, all the fish raised for food are females, triploid, 99% are reproductively sterile, and raised in areas where escaped salmon could not survive. Bacteria have also been modified to depend on nutrients that cannot be found in nature, and genetic use restriction technology has been developed, though not yet marketed, that causes the second generation of GM plants to be sterile.

Other environmental and agronomic concerns include a decrease in biodiversity, an increase in secondary pests (non-targeted pests) and evolution of resistant insect pests. In the areas of China and the US with Bt crops the overall biodiversity of insects has increased and the impact of secondary pests has been minimal. Resistance was found to be slow to evolve when best practice strategies were followed. The impact of Bt crops on beneficial non-target organisms became a public issue after a 1999 paper suggested they could be toxic to monarch butterflies. Follow up studies have since shown that the toxicity levels encountered in the field were not high enough to harm the larvae.

Accusations that scientists are "playing God" and other religious issues have been ascribed to the technology from the beginning. With the ability to genetically engineer humans now possible there are ethical concerns over how far this technology should go, or if it should be used at all. Much debate revolves around where the line between treatment and enhancement is and whether the modifications should be inheritable. Other concerns include contamination of the non-genetically modified food supply, the rigor of the regulatory process, consolidation of control of the food supply in companies that make and sell GMOs, exaggeration of the benefits of genetic modification, or concerns over the use of herbicides with glyphosate. Other issues raised include the patenting of life and the use of intellectual property rights.

There are large differences in consumer acceptance of GMOs, with Europeans more likely to view GM food negatively than North Americans. GMOs arrived on the scene as the public confidence in food safety, attributed to recent food scares such as Bovine spongiform encephalopathy and other scandals involving government regulation of products in Europe, was low. This along with campaigns run by various non-governmental organizations (NGO) have been very successful in blocking or limiting the use of GM crops. NGOs like the Organic Consumers Association, the Union of Concerned Scientists, Greenpeace and other groups have said that risks have not been adequately identified and managed and that there are unanswered questions regarding the potential long-term impact on human health from food derived from GMOs. They propose mandatory labeling or a moratorium on such products.

== See also ==
- Gain-of-function research
