= Barbara Bachmann =

American lecturer (1924–1999)

- Born: Barbara Joyce Bachmann; May 16, 1924; Fort Scott, Kansas, U.S.
- Died: January 31, 1999 (aged 74)
- Education: Baker University (B.A.); University of Kentucky (M.S.); Stanford University (Ph.D.)
- Occupation: Lecturer
- Known for: E. coli K-12 genetic linkage map
- Scientific career
- Workplaces: E. coli Genetic Stock Center

Barbara Joyce Bachmann (May 16, 1924 – January 31, 1999) was a lecturer at Yale University, UC Berkeley, Columbia and NYU, and is best known as director of the E. coli Genetic Stock Center and for publishing editions of the standard E. coli K-12 genetic linkage map.

== Education ==
She received her B.A. from Baker University in 1945, her M.S. from the University of Kentucky in 1947 and her Ph.D. in microbiology from Stanford University in 1954.

== Employment ==
The E. coli Genetic Stock Center was established by Edward Adelberg at Yale University in 1971. Barbara Bachmann was initially hired as curator and later become director of the center until her retirement in 1995. She was instrumental in both maintaining the strain collection but also standardizing the E. coli K-12 genetic map creating a common system for all K-12 researchers. She published 8 editions of the E. coli linkage map as well a pedigree of common K-12 strains. One of her publications of the E. coli linkage map in 1983 and 1991 became one of the most cited articles in all of biology those years.

== Awards and honors ==
Barbara Bachmann was honored with the J. Roger Porter Award in 1986 for her work curating the E. coli genetic stock center.
