= PGLO =

Engineered plasmid

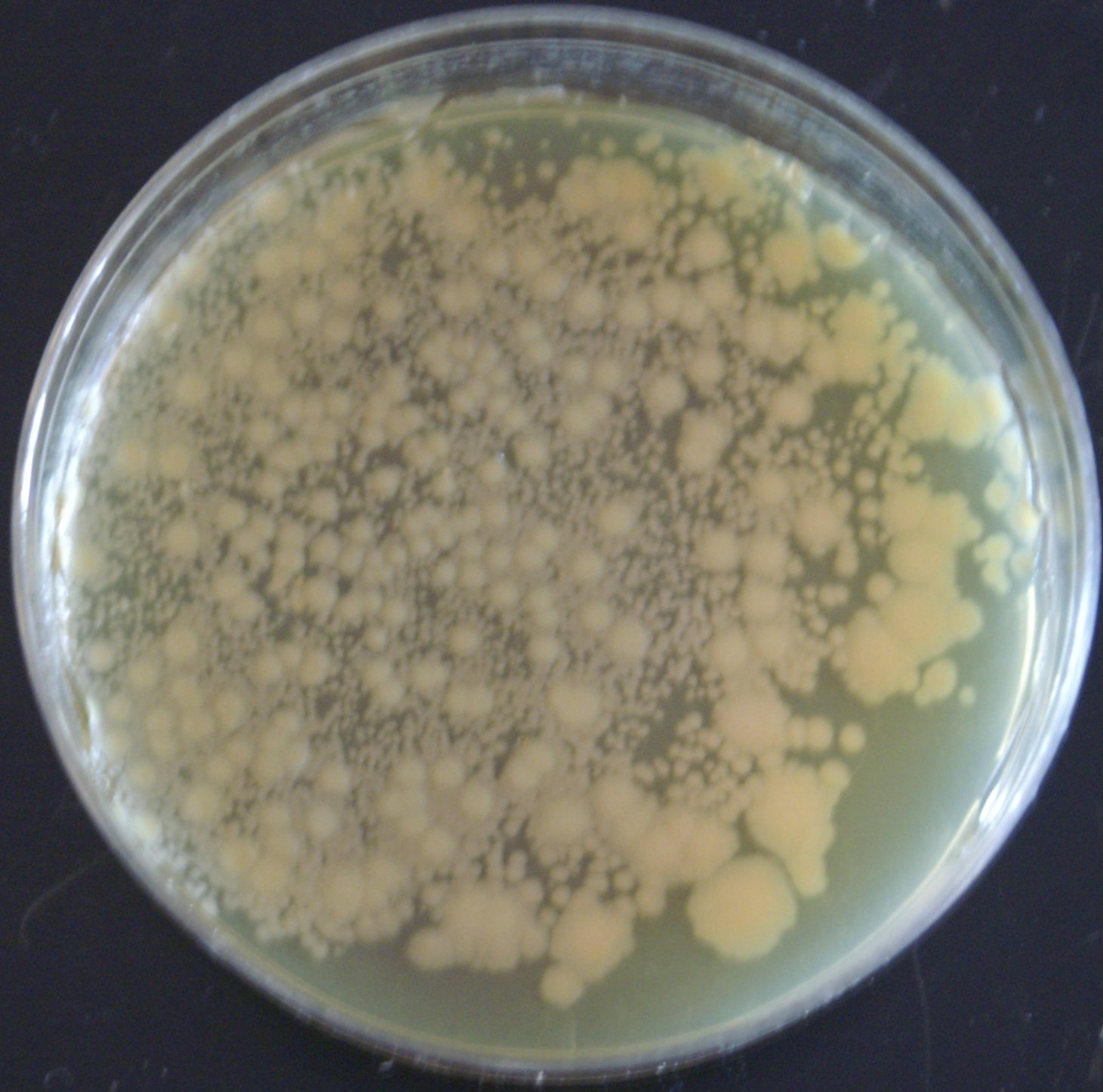
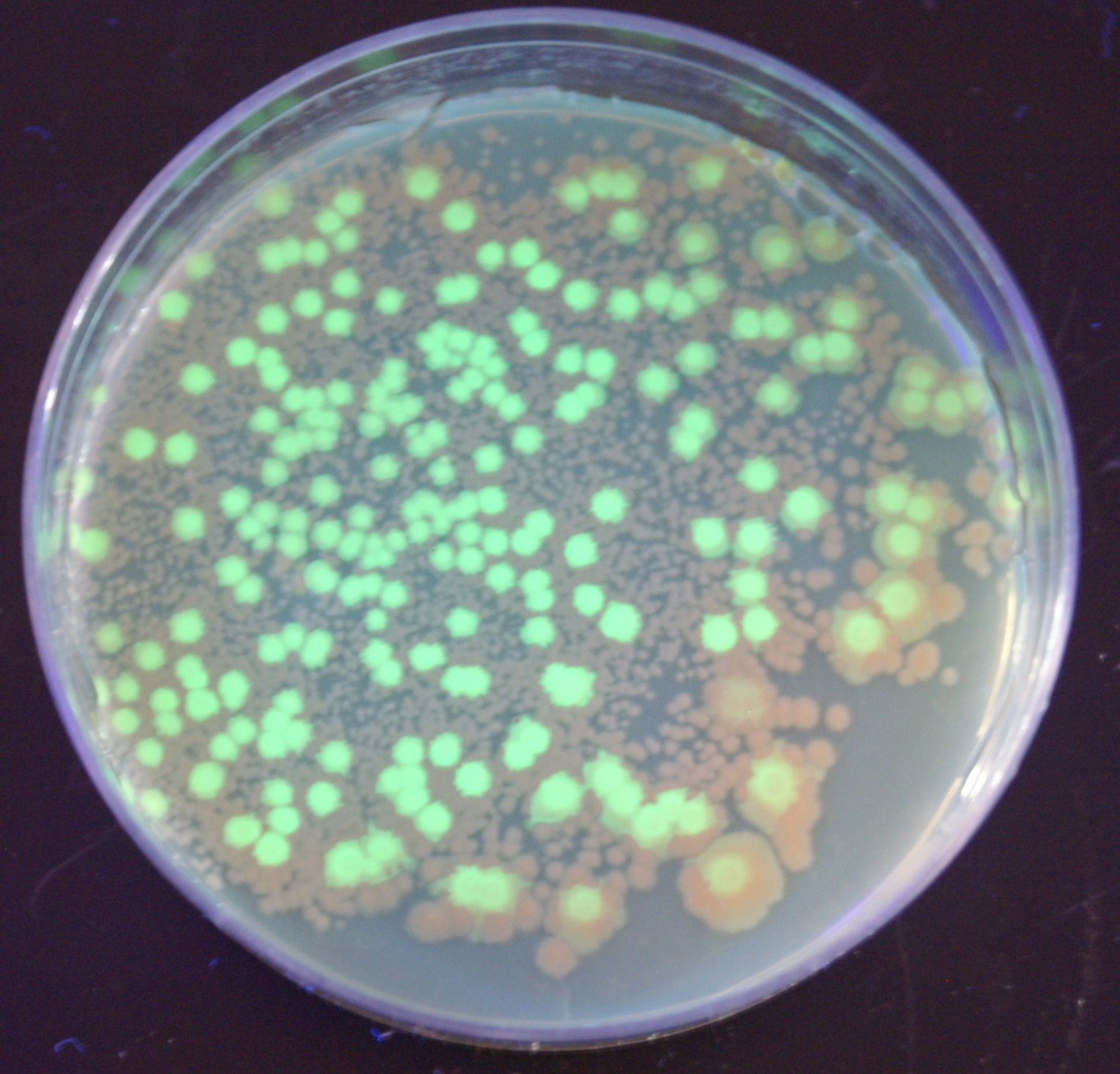
Left: Bacteria transformed with pGLO under ambient light
Right:Bacteria transformed with pGLO visualized under ultraviolet light
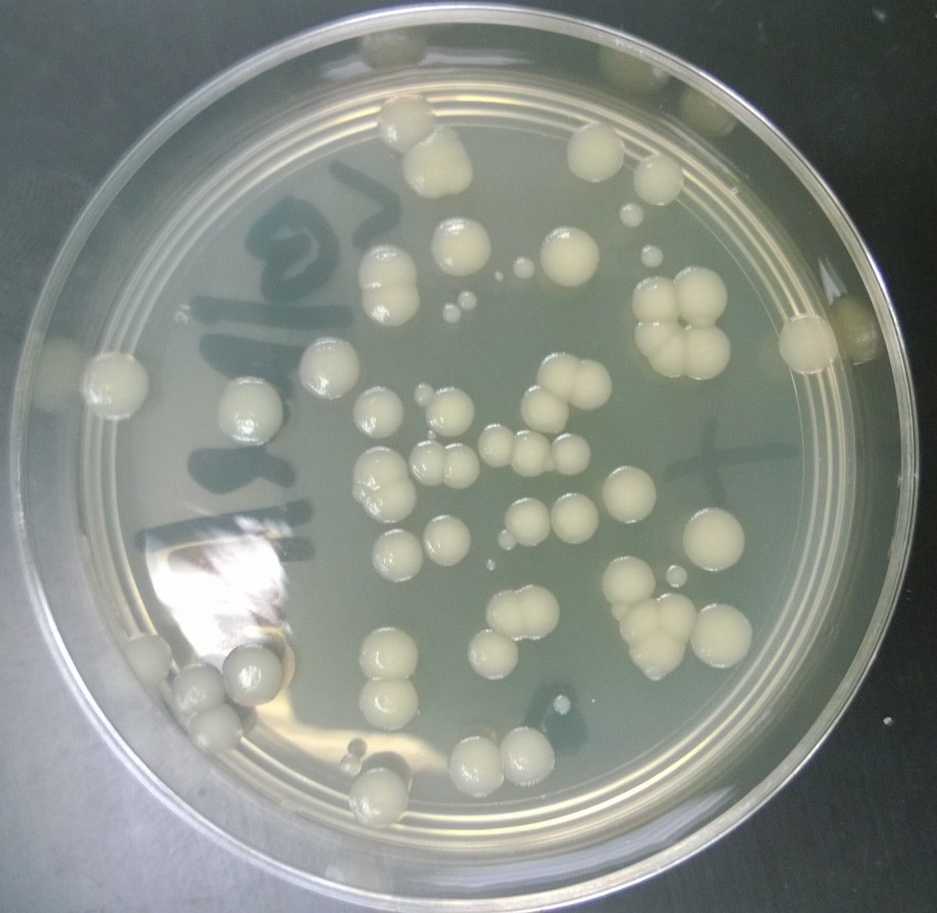
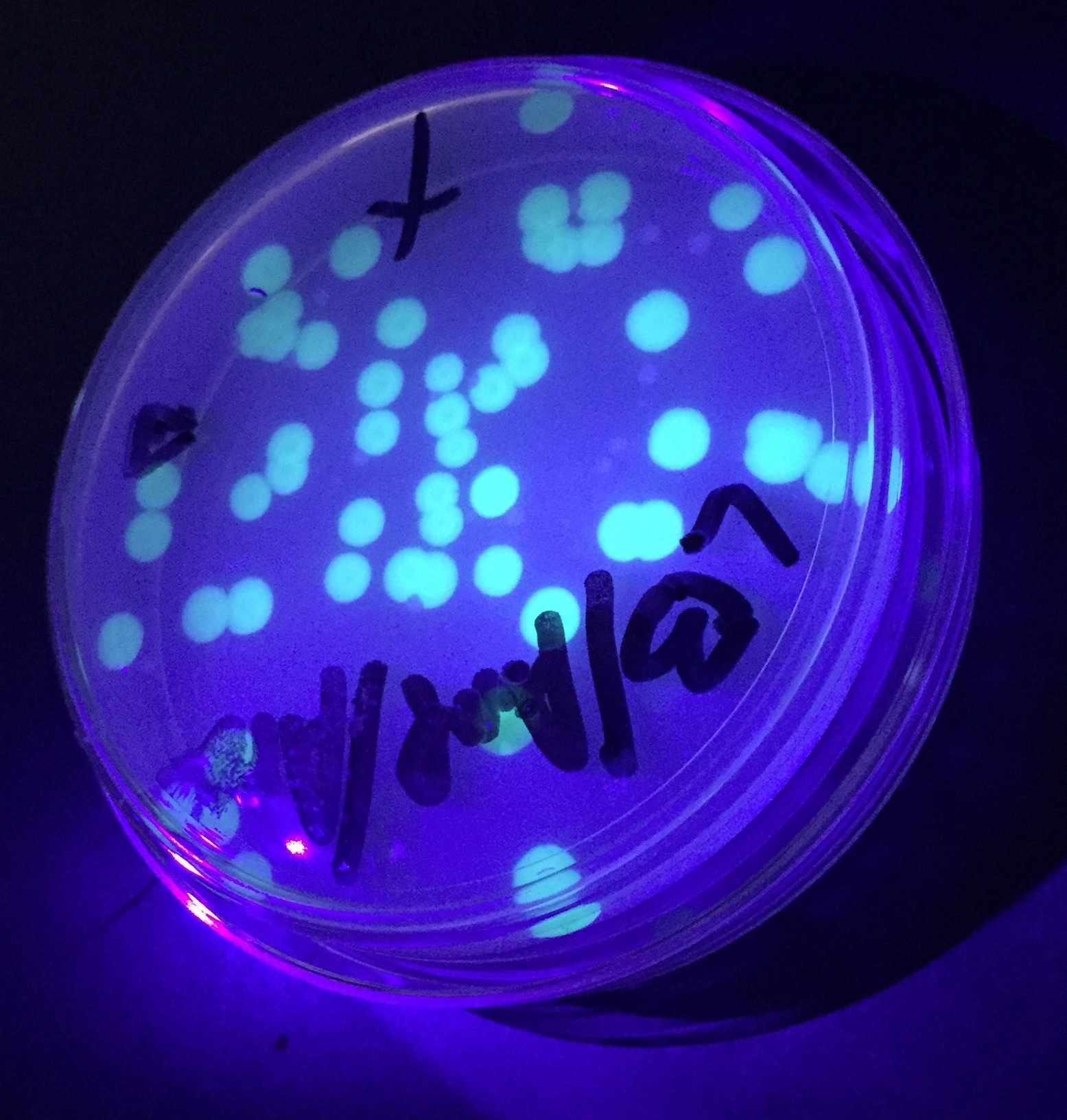
Left: Bacteria transformed with pGLO exposed to ampicillin and ambient light
Right:Bacteria transformed with pGLO exposed to ampicillin, arabinose and ultraviolet light

The pGLO plasmid is an engineered plasmid used in biotechnology as a vector for creating genetically modified organisms. The plasmid contains several reporter genes, most notably the green fluorescent protein (GFP) and the ampicillin resistance gene. GFP was isolated from the jelly fish Aequorea victoria. Because it shares a bidirectional promoter with a gene for metabolizing arabinose, the GFP gene is expressed in the presence of arabinose, which makes the transgenic organism express its fluorescence under UV light. GFP can be induced in bacteria containing the pGLO plasmid by growing them on +arabinose plates. pGLO is made by Bio-Rad Laboratories.

== Structure ==
pGLO is made up of three genes that are joined together using recombinant DNA technology. They are as follows:

- Bla, which codes for the enzyme beta-lactamase giving the transformed bacteria resistance to the beta-lactam family of antibiotics (such as of the penicillin family)
- araC, a promoter region that regulates the expression of GFP (specifically, the GFP gene will be expressed only in the presence of arabinose)
- GFP, the green fluorescent protein, which gives a green glow if cells produce this type of protein

Like most other circular plasmids, the pGLO plasmid contains an origin of replication (ori), which is a region of the plasmid where replication will originate. The pGLO plasmid was made famous by researchers in France who used it to produce a green fluorescent rabbit named Alba.

Other features on pGLO, like most other plasmids, include a selectable marker and an MCS (multiple cloning site) located at the end of the GFP gene. The plasmid is 5371 base pairs long. In supercoiled form, it runs on an agarose gel in the 4200–4500 range.

== Discovery of GFP ==
The GFP gene was first observed by Osamu Shimomura and his team in 1962 while studying the jellyfish Aequorea victoria that have a ring of blue light under their umbrella. Shimomura and his team isolated the protein aequorin from thousands of jellyfish until they gathered enough for a full analysis of the protein. It was through the study of aequorin that Shimomura discovered small amounts of GFP which glows green when aequorin emits blue light. After successfully discovering how GFP works with aequorin in the jellyfish, he set it aside to study bioluminescence in other organisms.

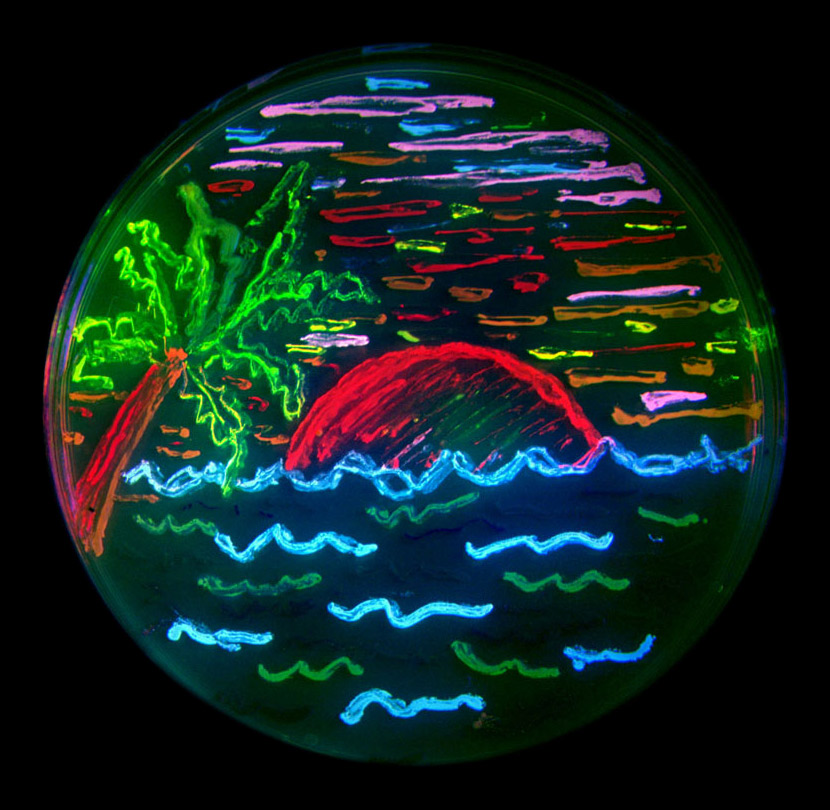
Example of mutant GFP that glow different colors to paint a picture of a beach

In 1994 Marty Chalfie and his team were able to successfully create bacteria and round worms that expressed the GFP protein. Soon after, Roger Tsien and his team were able to create mutant GFP that can emit a range of colors, not just green.

The three scientists hold the Nobel Prize in Chemistry for 2008 for the discovery and development of the green fluorescent protein, GFP.
