= DMH-11 Mustard =

Genetically modified variety of mustard plant

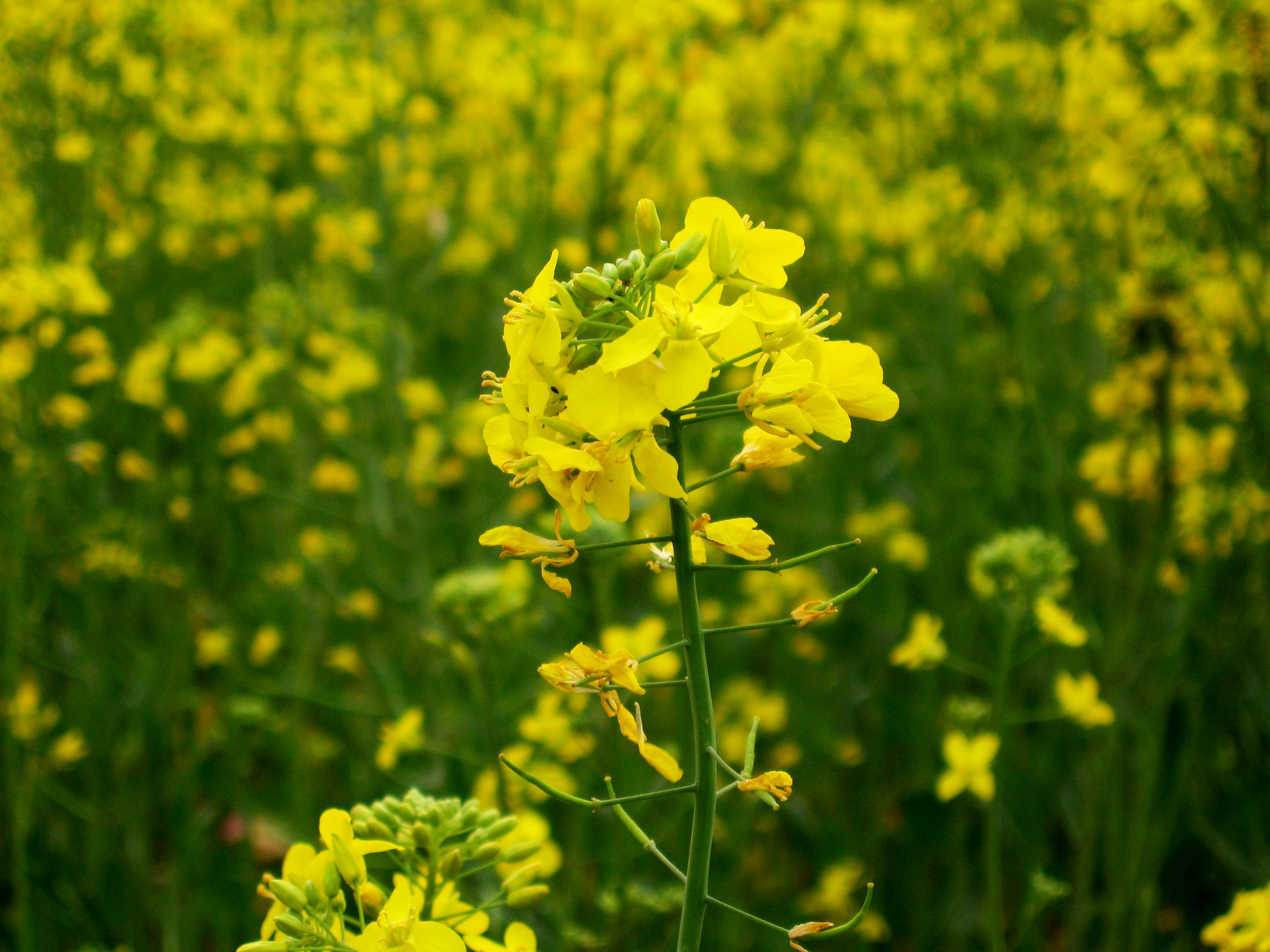
Mustard plant

Dhara Mustard Hybrid-11, otherwise known as DMH - 11, is a genetically modified hybrid variety of the mustard species Brassica juncea. It was developed by Professor Deepak Pental from the University of Delhi, with the aim of reducing India's demand for edible oil imports. DMH - 11 was created through transgenic technology, primarily involving the Bar, Barnase and Barstar gene system. The Barnase gene confers male sterility, while the Barstar gene restores DMH - 11's ability to produce fertile seeds. The insertion of the third gene Bar, enables DMH - 11 to produce phosphinothricin-N- acetyl-transferase, the enzyme responsible for Glufosinate resistance. This hybrid mustard variety has come under intense public scrutiny, mainly due to concerns regarding DMH - 11's potential to adversely affect the environment as well as consumer health. DMH - 11 was found not to pose any food allergy risks, and has demonstrated increased yields over existing mustard varieties. Conflicting details and results regarding the field trials and safety evaluations conducted on DMH - 11 have delayed its approval for commercial cropping.

== History ==
Mustard is an oil seed crop which currently occupies 6–7 million ha (15–17 million acres) of agricultural land, predominantly in the North-western dry land regions of India. Mustard is among the three highest produced oil seed crops in India. However, its yields have not experienced any significant increase for several years, and has remained below 7.5 million tonnes. The DMH - 11 Mustard variety was developed to reduce India's dependence on foreign oil imports for human consumption. On an annual basis, India approximately spends Rs. 60,000 crore ($10.5 billion) on 14.5 million tonnes of edible oil imports, with over 60% of domestic edible oil demands being met only through supplies from overseas. Increasing domestic yields of mustard oil would significantly reduce India's dependency on oil imports and the associated costs. The transgenic mustard variety DMH - 11 was developed by Dr. Deepak Pental, and his colleagues from the Centre for Genetic Manipulation of Crop Plants at the University of Delhi, South Campus. It took 14 years and approximately Rs. 700 million to successfully create the DMH - 11 variety. If approved, DMH - 11 will be the first genetically modified food crop to be commercially cultivated in India. The project to develop DMH - 11 received funding from the National Dairy Development Board of India, as well as the Department of Biotechnology (DBT).

== Development ==
=== Methods and mechanism ===
The transgenic mustard DMH - 11 was developed in 2002 using genetic material isolated from non-pathogenic soil bacteria, and techniques in transgenic systems for pollination control, which primarily involved the Barnase-Barstar system. Three genes, Bar, Barnase and Barstar, were extracted from Bacillus amyloliquefaciens to produce the hybrid seed. The main reason for introducing the Barnase-Barstar gene system into the transgenic mustard line, was for heterosis breeding and to prevent self-fertilization. The insertion of the Barnase gene induces genetic male sterility by preventing the production of the male gametophytes (pollen grains) in the mustard plant. Meanwhile, the Barstar gene acts to restore the ability of the plant to produce fertile hybrid seeds. Mustard is a self-pollinating plant, thus, making it difficult to perform cross-pollination with another desired male parental line, without the occurrence of self-pollination. The Barnase gene induced male sterility in DMH - 11, simplifying the process of cross pollination to derive new hybrid varieties. The two parental strains used to develop DMH -11 are the Early Hira mutant (EH -2) which was developed by Anil Khalatkar of Nagpur University, and the Varuna bn 3.6. The seed weight of DHM-11 is reported to be around 3.3 to 3.5 grams (0.12 oz)/1000 seeds.

DMH - 11's Glufosinate resistance is due to an enzyme expressed by the Bar (Bialaphos resistance) gene. Derived from Streptomyces hygroscopicus, the cloned Bar gene in DMH-11 encodes for the synthesis of phosphinothricin-N- acetyl-transferase (PAT). This enzyme is responsible for detoxifying the active ingredient in the herbicide Glufosinate : phosphinothricin. Phosphinothricin's mechanism of action involves the inhibition of Glutamine synthetase, which prevents the detoxification of ammonia and subsequently causes toxic buildup within plant cells. Inhibition of glutamine synthetase also leads to an overall reduction in Glutamine levels. In plants, Glutamine acts as a signalling molecule, and as a major amino acid donor for nucleotide synthesis. PAT enzymes produced by the Bar gene, deactivate Bialaphos (the tripeptide precursor to phosphinothricin) through acetylation to form an inactive, non-toxic product.

=== Safety evaluation ===
In September 2015, the University of Delhi South Campus submitted an application to the Genetic Engineering Appraisal Committee requesting permission for environmental release of DMH - 11. Prior to commercialisation, the mustard hybrid was subject to a confined bio-safety field evaluation, formally known as a Bio-safety Research Level (BRL) trial, under the Indian Council of Agricultural Research (ICAR). This trial was carried out in 2014–2015 after being granted permission from the Genetic Engineering Appraisal Committee (GEAC), India's apex regulator of transgenic products. The safety studies done for DMH - 11 were assigned to the following categories : molecular characterisation, food safety, environmental safety and detection protocols. Molecular characterisation involves expression studies of the Bar, Barnase and Barstar genes inserted into DMH - 11's DNA sequence. Food safety tests examined the toxicity of the three proteins in DMH - 11, using compositional and bioinformatics analysis. Environmental safety trials tested the potential for weediness, and aggressive parameters of DMH - 11. The details and results of these safety trials have not been made public yet.

There is a summary of the safety evaluation available online, however, the raw data has been withheld from the public by the Ministry of Environment and Forests (MoEF). It can only be accessed through an application to the MoEF. The official 133-page safety assessment of DMH - 11, entitled "Assessment of Food and Environmental Safety of GE Mustard", was uploaded onto GEAC's website for public feedback, where it received 750 comments from members of the public. These comments were then reviewed by a sub-committee, and incorporated into the final safety evaluation report submitted to GEAC. The report inferred that DMH - 11 was safe for human consumption, and contains nutritious value. Anita Prasad, the chairperson of the GEAC, announced that the commission will positively recommend DMH - 11 to Environment Minister Anil Madhav Dave for planting.

The GEAC initially cleared DMH - 11 for commercial cultivation, however, they retracted their approval upon deciding that more tests, and additional data concerning the effect of DMH - 11 on insect pollinators, in particular honeybees, and on soil microbial diversity was needed prior to commercialisation. The Centre for Genetic Manipulation of Crop Plants at the University of Delhi applied for permission to grow DMH - 11 plots in Delhi and Punjab, to test the effects of the transgenic mustard on honeybees. In March 2018, the Genetic Engineering Appraisal Committee approved DMH - 11 for field studies to investigate its potential effects on honeybees and other pollinating insects. The field trials will be conducted at the Punjab Agriculture University and the Indian Agricultural Research Institute.

== Controversy ==
=== Health effects ===
The Honorable Supreme Court of India appointed a Technical Expert Committee (TEC) which in its 2013 report recommended a total ban on herbicide-tolerant transgenic crops. One of the reasons the TEC cited was the possibility of ensuing negative health effects as a result of farmers generously applying herbicide to their crops.

=== Ecological effects ===
A major reason for to DMH - 11 being commercialised is the potential formation of 'super weeds'. DMH - 11 is Glufosinate tolerant, and therefore it is thought to encourage farmers to liberally spray the herbicide upon commercialisation. This causes an artificial selection pressure on weeds which could result in the emergence of Glufosinate-resistant weed species. The biggest concern, however, with regards to DMH - 11 being commercially cultivated, is the potential genetic pollution of the rich biodiversity of the genus Brassica, via cross pollination between DMH-11 and wild populations. Mustard plants undergo wind and insect mediated pollination. Due to its susceptibility to outcrossing, there is a possibility of India's rich mustard germplasm consisting of wild varieties and domesticated landraces being irreversibly contaminated.

=== Social and economic effects ===
In 2004, the chairman of the Task Force in Agricultural Biotechnology advised against commercialisation of herbicide-resistant crops as they eliminate the need for manual weeding, a job undertaken by many rural women in India. It was estimated by Kavita Kuruganti, a member of the Alliance for Sustainable and Holistic Agriculture, that growing even 25% of DMH - 11 will result in a loss of 4.25 crore employment days for many women.

Another reason for the strong opposition against the commercialisation of DMH - 11 across India, is due to past negative experiences with GM crops, most notably Bt cotton in Maharashtra. There was a proposed link between the poor performance of Bt cotton, and a large number of farmers' suicides, particularly in 2004. DMH - 11 protesters believe that exorbitant seed prices, coupled with low yields could lead to financial hardship, economic stress and possibly more suicide among farmers. The link between GE crop cultivation and farmer suicides, however, has been shown to be unsubstantiated by available data, despite being used as a common talking point against agricultural biotechnology within India. Yet another past negative experience is the threat of adding terminator gene in the GM crop which will make the farmers perpetually dependent on big corporate which threatens farmers' sovereignty.

== Performance ==
=== Yield ===
DMH - 11 demonstrated yield heterosis in the range of 19%–40% over some of the best Indian varieties. There are, however, two traits that have been found to be poorly developed and expressed in the hybrid variety; these are seed size and siliqua length. Both of these traits are important yield components. Another multi-site trial conducted under field conditions found the DMH - 11 to produce 30% more yield than existing strains of traditional mustard varieties.

=== Allergenic potential ===
DMH - 11 was also subject to a food allergenicity test using bioinformatics comparisons following CODEX and ICMR guidelines, to examine whether the amino acid sequence of Bar, Barnase and Bastar proteins were potential allergens. The test was carried out by identifying any similarities between the amino acid sequence of the three proteins, to that of other known putative allergens. The potential open reading frames at the DNA insertion site of the three genes, were assessed for potential similarities to existing allergens in the AllergenOnline.org database. The results of the study found that DMH - 11 does not present any risk of food allergy to consumers. Further trials on DMH - 11 have been suggested, such as performing a human serum IgE test.
