= Ferrier reaction =

Ferrier reaction can refer to two different chemical reactions:

- Ferrier rearrangement
- Ferrier carbocyclization (Ferrier II reaction)
