= C11H13NO3 =

The molecular formula C_{11}H_{13}NO_{3} (molar mass : 207.23 g/mol) may refer to:

- Hydrastinine
- Methylone
- Streptazolin
- Toloxatone
- N-Benzoyl-GABA
- βk-BDB
