= Phosphonoacetaldehyde reductase (NADH) =

Enzyme

Identifiers
- EC no.: 1.1.1.309

Databases
- IntEnz: IntEnz view
- BRENDA: BRENDA entry
- ExPASy: NiceZyme view
- KEGG: KEGG entry
- MetaCyc: metabolic pathway
- PRIAM: profile
- PDB structures: RCSB PDB PDBe PDBsum
Search
- PMC: articles
- PubMed: articles
- NCBI: proteins

Phosphonoacetaldehyde reductase (NADH) (EC 1.1.1.309, PhpC) is an enzyme with systematic name 2-hydroxyethylphosphonate:NAD^{+} oxidoreductase. This enzyme catalyses the following chemical reaction

2-hydroxyethylphosphonic acid
+ NAD^{+}
H^{+}
H^{+}
phosphonoacetaldehyde
+ NADH

The enzyme from Streptomyces viridochromogenes catalyses a step in the biosynthesis of phosphinothricin tripeptide, the reduction of phosphonoacetaldehyde to 2-hydroxyethylphosphonic acid.
