= Binary vector =

Binary vector may mean:

- In computer science: a bit array or bit vector
- In biotechnology: a transfer DNA binary system
