= 23S rRNA (uridine2479-2'-O)-methyltransferase =

Class of enzymes

23S rRNA (uridine^{2479}-2'-O)-methyltransferase

Identifiers
- EC no.: 2.1.1.208

Databases
- IntEnz: IntEnz view
- BRENDA: BRENDA entry
- ExPASy: NiceZyme view
- KEGG: KEGG entry
- MetaCyc: metabolic pathway
- PRIAM: profile
- PDB structures: RCSB PDB PDBe PDBsum
Search
- PMC: articles
- PubMed: articles
- NCBI: proteins

23S rRNA (uridine^{2479}-2'-O)-methyltransferase (EC 2.1.1.208, AviRb) is an enzyme with systematic name S-adenosyl-L-methionine:23S rRNA (uridine^{2479}-2'-O)-methyltransferase. This enzyme catalyses the following chemical reaction

S-adenosyl-L-methionine + uridine^{2479} in 23S rRNA $\rightleftharpoons$ S-adenosyl-L-homocysteine + 2'-O-methyluridine^{2479} in 23S rRNA

Streptomyces viridochromogenes produces the antibiotic avilamycin A which binds to the 50S ribosomal subunit to inhibit protein synthesis.
