= Lynn Caporale =

American biochemist and author

- Born: September 29, 1948 (age 78); United States
- Education: Brooklyn College (B.S.); University of California, Berkeley (Ph.D., 1973)
- Known for: Arguing that mechanisms generating genome variation are themselves subject to natural selection
- Notable work: Darwin in the Genome, 2003; The Implicit Genome, 2006
- Scientific career
- Fields: Biochemistry, molecular biology, evolutionary biology
- Workplaces: Georgetown University Medical Center; Merck & Co. Columbia University

Lynn Helena Caporale is an American biochemist, author and independent scholar of biology known for her work on the molecular mechanisms of genome variation and their relationship to natural selection. She has argued that the mechanisms by which genetic variation is generated are themselves subject to natural selection, such that genomes have evolved to increase the probability of adaptive mutations.

== Education ==
Caporale is of Italian and Eastern European descent, she received a B.S. with honors in chemistry from Brooklyn College of the City University of New York, and a Ph.D. in molecular biology from the University of California, Berkeley in 1973. Her postdoctoral work included a fellowship at New York University Medical Center, a research position at Memorial Sloan Kettering Cancer Center, and a adjunct assistant professor role at Rockefeller University.

== Career ==
Caporale served as an assistant professor of biochemistry at Georgetown University Medical Center, where she first proposed that the degeneracy of the genetic code could allow additional information to be represented within a protein-coding sequence, as described in her 1984 paper "Is There a Higher Level Genetic Code that Directs Evolution?"

She subsequently spent over a decade at Merck & Co., as a Senior Director, establishing scientific collaborations with international pharmaceutical companies and research institutions. She has also taught genetics and biomedical topics at Columbia University, St. John's University, and City University of New York.

Caporale has published research around the idea that mutation rates and types are not uniformly random across a genome, and that the mechanisms generating heritable variation are themselves shaped by natural selection, a feedback loop in which biochemical mechanisms that tend to produce variants surviving recurring environmental challenges are preserved and inherited across lineages of genomes.

== Books ==
=== Darwin in the Genome (2003) ===
Published by McGraw-Hill, Darwin in the Genome: Molecular Strategies in Biological Evolution argues that genomes have evolved biochemical mechanisms that increase the relative probability of adaptive mutations, challenging the neo-Darwinian assumption that heritable variation arises from purely random mutations. Examples discussed include mutational hot spots in cone snail toxin genes and the antibody diversity-generating machinery of the vertebrate immune system. Caporale explicitly rejects the suggestion that her use of words like "strategy" implies a "preordained plan", as biochemical mechanisms can explain what appears to be directed mutation, and that rejecting the term "random" deepens rather than refutes Darwinian theory.

The book received mixed reviews. Lynn Corale's writing was described as informational, tough containing factual errors, possibly due to poor editing, such as a misstatement of the haploid chromosome number in humans. Adam Wilkins, writing in BioEssays, praised it as informative but argued that most of Caporale's examples are accelerated variations in a small number of genes, and that her extrapolation of these cases to evolution in general was not convincing, noting that elevated mutation rates carry biological costs she acknowledged only in passing.

=== The Implicit Genome (2006) ===
Caporale edited this compilation for Oxford University Press, bringing together various contributions arguing that genomes contain forms of information beyond the linear nucleotide sequence. Straying well beyond "orthodox" Neo-Darwinism, It has been described as reiterating ideas similar to that of Richard Goldschmidt's "Hopeful Monsters" theory.

== See also ==
- Eva Jablonka
- Mae-Wan Ho
