= Robert Ferrier =

Robert or Bob Ferrier may refer to:

- Bob Ferrier (English footballer) (1899–1971), played for Motherwell F.C.
- Bob Ferrier (Scottish footballer) (1874–1947), father of the above, played for Sheffield Wednesday F.C.
- Robert J. Ferrier (1932–2013), chemist
