= PGreen =

The pGreen plasmids are vectors for plant transformation. They were first described in 2000 as components of a novel T-DNA binary system. The supporting web page provides supplementary information and ongoing support to researchers to request their plasmid resources. As these plasmids have been taken up by the research community, the plasmids have been developed, expanding the resources available to the community.

Researchers are encouraged to contribute to this research community by submitting their vector sequence to genbank and providing a description of the plasmid on the site.

== pGreenI and pGreenII ==
pGreen is the original pGreen plasmid. pGreenII features plasmid backbone modification to improve plasmid stability.

== T-DNA regions ==
=== No transformation selection ===
pGreenII 0000: minimal T-DNA with Left and Right border, lacZ gene for blue/white selection during cloning multiple cloning site derived from pBluescript.

pGreenII 62-SK: derived from pGreenII 0000, the LacZ blue/white cloning selection has been replaced with a 35S-MCS-CaMV cassette that allows the insertion of a gene of interest into a 35S over-expression cassette. The multiple cloning site (MCS) is derived from pBluescript.

=== Kanamycin selection ===
pGreenII 0029: derived from pGreenII 0000, a nos-kan cassette has been inserted into the HpaI site of the Left Border, providing resistance to kanamycin during plant transformation selection.

pGreenII 0029 62-SK: derived from pGreenII 0029, the LacZ blue/white cloning selection has been replaced with a 35S-MCS-CaMV cassette that allows the insertion of a gene of interest into a 35S over-expression cassette. The MCS is derived from pBluescript.

=== Hygromycin selection ===
pGreenII 0179: derived from pGreenII 0000, a 35S-hyg cassette has been inserted into the HpaI site of the Left Border, providing resistance to hygromycin during plant transformation selection.

=== Bialaphos selection ===
pGreenII 0229: derived from pGreenII 0000, a nos-bar cassette has been inserted into the HpaI site of the Left Border, providing resistance to bialaphos or phosphinothricin during plant transformation selection.

pGreenII 0229 62-SK: derived from pGreenII 0229, the LacZ blue/white cloning selection has been replaced with a 35S-MCS-CaMV cassette that allows the insertion of a gene of interest into a 35S over-expression cassette. The MCS is derived from pBluescript.

== pSoup ==
This is the helper plasmid that provides the replicase function for the pSa replication origin of pGreen. pSoup is tetracyclin resistant and a complementary incompatibility group such that it can co-exist with pGreen in the Agrobacterium cell.

pSoup: the original help plasmid for pGreen. pGreen will not replicate in Agrobacterium if it is not present.
