= Avira (disambiguation) =

Avira is a German multinational cybersecurity company.

Avira may also refer to:

- 23S rRNA (guanine2535-N1)-methyltransferase, an enzyme
- Avira Rebecca, Indian filmmaker and script writer
- AviraKids, a Russian holding company founded in 2010 specializing in safe gaming and entertainment equipment
