= 23S rRNA (guanine2535-N1)-methyltransferase =

Class of enzymes

23S rRNA (guanine^{2535}-N^{1})-methyltransferase

Identifiers
- EC no.: 2.1.1.209

Databases
- IntEnz: IntEnz view
- BRENDA: BRENDA entry
- ExPASy: NiceZyme view
- KEGG: KEGG entry
- MetaCyc: metabolic pathway
- PRIAM: profile
- PDB structures: RCSB PDB PDBe PDBsum
Search
- PMC: articles
- PubMed: articles
- NCBI: proteins

23S rRNA (guanine^{2535}-N^{1})-methyltransferase (EC 2.1.1.209, AviRa) is an enzyme with systematic name S-adenosyl-L-methionine:23S rRNA (guanine^{253}5-N^{1})-methyltransferase. This enzyme catalyses the following chemical reaction

S-adenosyl-L-methionine + guanine^{2535} in 23S rRNA $\rightleftharpoons$ S-adenosyl-L-homocysteine + N^{1}-methylguanine^{2535} in 23S rRNA

This is one of the methyltransferases from Streptomyces viridochromogenes . Streptomyces viridochromogenes produces the antibiotic avilamycin A which binds to the 50S ribosomal subunit to inhibit protein synthesis.
