= Richard Furneaux =

New Zealand chemist

Professor Richard Furneaux
- Education: Victoria University Wellington
- Known for: Carbohydrate chemistry
- Scientific career
- Doctoral advisor: Robin Ferrier

Richard Furneaux is a New Zealand carbohydrate chemist. He is known for leadership in chemistry and research commercialisation, and his role as the first director of the Ferrier Research Institute. He is currently director of Humblebee Ltd.

== Biography ==
Furneaux completed his PhD at Victoria University of Wellington, under the supervision of Robin Ferrier. He then completed a postdoctoral fellowship in the lab of Fred Shafizadeh at the University of Montana. Following his fellowship, he returned to New Zealand and worked at Department of Scientific and Industrial Research. He eventually leading the carbohydrate team in what became Industrial Research Limited and eventually the Ferrier Research Institute.

In collaboration with Vern L. Schramm, Furneaux and Peter Tyler designed and synthesised Forodesine.

Furneaux is a Fellow of the Royal Society Te Aparangi and was awarded the Hector Medal in 2006 and Thomson Medal in 2012. He was awarded Wellingtonian of the Year in Science and Technology in 2013 and won the Kiwinet Supreme Award in 2017.
