= Phosalacine =

Names
- IUPAC name (2S)-2-[[(2S)-2-[[(2S)-2-amino-4-[hydroxy(methyl)phosphoryl]butanoyl]amino]propanoyl]amino]-4-methylpentanoic acid
- Other names (2S)-2-Amino-4-(hydroxymethylphosphinyl)butanoyl-L-alanyl-L-leucine

Identifiers
CAS Number	92567-89-0
3D model (JSmol)	Interactive image
ChemSpider	62917600
PubChem CID	13564971
- InChI: InChI=1S/C14H28N3O6P/c1-8(2)7-11(14(20)21)17-12(18)9(3)16-13(19)10(15)5-6-24(4,22)23/h8-11H,5-7,15H2,1-4H3,(H,16,19)(H,17,18)(H,20,21)(H,22,23)/t9-,10-,11-/m0/s1 Key: GRIZBDACBCXJCF-DCAQKATOSA-N
- SMILES: C[C@@H](C(=O)N[C@@H](CC(C)C)C(=O)O)NC(=O)[C@H](CCP(=O)(C)O)N

Properties
Chemical formula	C_{14}H_{28}N_{3}O_{6}P
Molar mass	365.367 g·mol^{−1}
- Except where otherwise noted, data are given for materials in their standard state (at 25 °C [77 °F], 100 kPa). Infobox references

Phosalacine is a natural antimicrobial and herbicidal compound that has been isolated from the Actinobacteria Kitasatosporia phosalacinea.

It is a tripeptide consisting of the amino acids glufosinate (phosphinothricin), alanine, and leucine. It is similar in structure to bialaphos, differing by replacement of the terminal alanine with leucine.

Phosalacine has antimicrobial activity against Gram-positive and Gram-negative bacteria and some fungi. It also shows herbicidal activity against alfalfa. It is believed that the herbicidal activity is due to the slow release of glufosinate, which is a commercially-used broad spectrum herbicide.
