= EHA101 =

Agrobacterium helper plasmid for plant gene transfer

EHA101 was one of the first and most widely used Agrobacterium helper plasmid for plant gene transfer. Created in 1985 in the laboratory of Mary-Dell Chilton at Washington University in St. Louis, it was named after the graduate student who constructed it. The EH stands for "Elizabeth Hood" and A for "Agrobacterium". The EHA101 helper strain is a derivative of A281, the hypervirulent A. tumefaciens strain that causes large, fast-growing tumors on solanaceous plants. This strain is used for moving genes of interest into many hundreds of species of plants all over the world.

For recalcitrant crops such as maize, wheat, and rice, the EHA helper strains are often employed for gene transfer. These strains are efficient at promoting T-DNA transfer because of the hypervirulence of the vir genes suggesting that a higher success rate can be achieved on these "hard to transform" crops or cultivars.

The chromosomal background of EHA101 is C58C1, a cured nopaline strain. The helper strains were derived from A281, which is A136(pTiBo542). A281 was genetically engineered through a double crossover, site-directed deletion to yield EHA101, a T-DNA deleted strain useful for target gene transfer into plants. EHA101 is resistant to kanamycin by way of an npt I gene in place of T-DNA. The parent strain, A281, does not show antibiotic resistances at higher levels than normal A. tumefaciens strains. Moreover, other transconjugant strains in the C58C1 background, do not show these increased resistances to antibiotics. Therefore, these characteristics are not simply a manifestation of the chromosomal background, but most likely an interaction of this Ti plasmid and the C58 chromosomal background.

The npt I gene in place of the T-DNA in EHA101 requires that binary plasmids that are put into the strain encode a drug resistance other than kanamycin. Strains EHA105 was generated from EHA101 through site-directed deletion of the kanamycin resistance gene from the Ti plasmid, otherwise the strains are identical. This latter strain has been useful to plant biotechnologists who use kanamycin as a selectable marker on their binary plasmids.
