= Deepak Pental =

Vice Chancellor University of Delhi
- In office 1 September 2005 – 31 August 2010
- Chancellor: Mohammad Hamid Ansari
- Preceded by: Prof. Deepak Nayyar
- Succeeded by: Prof. Dinesh Singh (academic)

Director, South Campus University of Delhi
- In office 2000–2005
- Preceded by: Prof. Abhai Mansingh
- Succeeded by: Prof. Dinesh Singh

Personal details
- Born: 1951 (age 74–75)
- Education: Punjab University, Chandigarh, Rutgers University, United States
- Profession: Research, Academician

Deepak Pental (born 1951) is a Professor of Genetics and the Ex Vice Chancellor at the University of Delhi. He is a noted researcher whose current research interests lie in development of transgenics and marker-assisted breeding of crops. He took charge of the post of Vice-chancellor of the University succeeding Professor Deepak Nayyar on 1 September 2005. As the VC, Pental has outlined his agenda to update the library system, work on teachers’ recruitment, increase student accommodation facilities and bring researchers working abroad to India. A new frog species, Minervarya Pentali, discovered in Western Ghats by a team of Delhi University researchers; was named after Pental.

== Education and employment ==
Pental completed his B.Sc.(Hons) and M.Sc.(Hons. School) from the Department of Botany, Panjab University, Chandigarh in 1971 and 1973 respectively. And subsequently he did his Ph.D. from Rutgers University, United States in 1978. Pental was a Postdoctoral and University Research Fellow at the University of Nottingham from 1978-84. He returned to India to join Tata Energy Research Institute (TERI) in 1985 and in 1993 he joined the University of Delhi, South Campus as Professor of Genetics. Pental had been Director of the University of Delhi, South Campus from 2000-2005. From 2005-2010 he was the Vice-Chancellor of the University.

== Research work ==
Pental’s research interests lie in breeding of mustard and cotton. He has published more than sixty research papers in the national and international peer reviewed journals and his work has led to major breakthroughs in hybrid seed production technologies. Pental is a keen student of social science policy particularly related to the field of agriculture. Years back Pental got Punjab University medal for diploma in Gandhian Philosophy which shows his interest in social sciences and Gandhian thought.

Some of his works are described below:

1. "Development of Transgenics in Four Major Crops – Cotton, Rice, Mungbean and Tomato for Resistance to Biotic Stresses" funded by Department of Biotechnology (DBT).
2. "Functional Genomics in Plants: Development and Use of the Technologies for Gene Discovery and Expression Modulation" funded by The New Millennium Indian Technology Leadership Initiative (NMITLI).
3. Edited a special issue of Current Science (Vol. 84, 2003) on Transgenic Crops. He also contributed three articles in the same volume.
4. Contributed an article "Transgenic Crops for Indian Agriculture: An Assessment of Their Relevance and Effective Use" in ‘Policy and Institutional Issues and Challenges in Indian Agriculture’ ed: Dr. Ramesh Chand, Oxfam, In Press.

== Awards and recognition ==
1. Awarded a Punjab University gold medal for first position in Diploma in Gandhian Philosophy.
2. Awarded a Biotechnology Career Fellowship in 1986 by the Rockefeller Foundation to work at the Max-Planck Institute in Cologne.
3. In 2004 he was awarded Jawaharlal Nehru Fellowship which he could not avail due to his administrative responsibilities.
4. Elected member of the National Academy of Agricultural Sciences, National Academy of Sciences, India, Indian Academy of Sciences and the Indian National Science Academy.
5. Member Governing body of CSIR.
6. Member editorial board of Journal of Biosciences and Current Science.
7. Member of various Project Advisory Committees in DST and DBT from 1986 onwards.
8. Member of RAC of CIMAP and IHBT
9. In 2007 he was awarded Officier Des Palmes Academiques for contributions to Research and Education by the Government of Republic of France.
10. Lifetime Achievement Award by Mahindra Samriddhi Foundation in 2018
