= Mae-Wan Ho =

Hong Kong geneticist

Mae-Wan Ho (Chinese: 何梅灣; pinyin: Hé Méiwān; 12 November 1941 – 24 March 2016) was a geneticist known for her critical views on genetic engineering and evolution. She authored or co-authored a number of publications, including 10 books, such as The Rainbow and the Worm, the Physics of Organisms (1993, 1998), Genetic Engineering: Dream or Nightmare? (1998, 1999), Living with the Fluid Genome (2003) and Living Rainbow H_{2}O (2012).

Interview with Ho on electromagnetic fields (02:01min)

Ho was criticized for embracing pseudoscience.

== Biography ==
Ho received a PhD in biochemistry in 1967 from Hong Kong University, was postdoctoral fellow in biochemical genetics, University of California, San Diego, from 1968 to 1972, senior research fellow in Queen Elizabeth College, lecturer in genetics (from 1976) and reader in biology (from 1985) in the Open University, and since retiring in June 2000 visiting professor of biophysics in Catania University, Sicily.

Ho died of cancer in March 2016.

== Institute of Science in Society ==
Ho was a co-founder and director of the Institute of Science in Society (ISIS), an interest group which published fringe articles about climate change, GMOs, homeopathy, traditional Chinese medicine, and water memory. In reviewing the organisation, David Colquhoun accused the ISIS of promoting pseudoscience and specifically criticised Ho's understanding of homeopathy.

The institute is on the Quackwatch list of questionable organizations.

== Genetic engineering ==
Ho, together with Joe Cummins of the University of Western Ontario, has argued that a sterility gene engineered into a crop could be transferred to other crops or wild relatives and that "This could severely compromise the agronomic performance of conventional crops and cause wild relatives to go extinct". They argued that this process could also produce genetic instabilities, which might be "leading to catastrophic breakdown", and stated that there are no data to assure that this has not happened or cannot happen. This concern contrasts with the reason why these sterile plants were developed, which was to prevent the transfer of genes to the environment by preventing any plants that are bred with or that receive these genes from reproducing. Indeed, any gene that caused sterility when transferred to a new species would be eliminated by natural selection and could not spread.

Ho expressed concerns about the spread of altered genes through horizontal gene transfer and that the experimental alteration of genetic structures may be out of control. One of her concerns is that the antibiotic resistant gene that was isolated from bacteria and used in some GM crops might cross back from plants by horizontal gene transfer to different species of bacteria, because "If this happened it would leave us unable to treat major illnesses like meningitis and E coli." Her views were published in an opinion article based on a review of others' research. The arguments and conclusions of this article were heavily criticized by prominent plant scientists, and the claims of the article criticized in detail in a response that was published in the same journal, prompting a reply from Ho. A review on the topic published in 2008 in the Annual Review of Plant Biology stated that "These speculations have been extensively rebutted by the scientific community". Indeed, at the launch of her 1998 book Genetic Engineering Dream or Nightmare? (held in the very room in which the first reading of Darwin´s On The Origin of Species had been given in 1860!) opposing her was John Durant, Professor of Public Understanding of Science at Imperial College, London. At a dinner afterwards - and Ho already a grandmother - the Professor came to blows with her.

Ho has also argued that bacteria could acquire the bacterial gene barnase from transgenic plants. This gene kills any cell that expresses it and lacks barstar, the specific inhibitor of barnase activity. In an article entitled Chronicle of An Ecological Disaster Foretold, which was published in an ISIS newsletter, Ho speculated that if a bacterium acquired the barnase gene and survived, this could make the bacteria a more dangerous pathogen.

== Evolution ==
Ho has claimed that evolution is pluralistic because there are many mechanisms that can produce variation in phenotypes independently of haphazard mutations. Ho has advocated a form of Lamarckian evolution. She has been criticized by the scientific community for setting up straw man arguments in her criticism of natural selection and supporting discredited evolutionary theories. But some of her Lamarckian ideas have since entered the mainstream of the evolutionary literature.

The paleontologist Philip Gingerich has noted that Ho's evolutionary ideas are based on vitalistic thinking.

== Publications ==
- Mae-Wan Ho. Living Rainbow H_{2}O, Singapore; River Edge, NJ: World Scientific, 2012. ISBN 978-9814390897.
- Mae-Wan Ho. Meaning of Life & the Universe, Singapore; River Edge, NJ: World Scientific, 2017. ISBN 978-981-3108-85-1
- Mae-Wan Ho. The Rainbow and the Worm, the Physics of Organisms, Singapore; River Edge, NJ: World Scientific, 1998. ISBN 981-02-4813-X.
- Mae-Wan Ho. Genetic engineering: dream or nightmare? Turning the tide on the brave new world of bad science and big business, New York, NY: Continuum, 2000. ISBN 0-8264-1257-2.
- Mae-Wan Ho. Living with the fluid genome, London, UK: Institute of Science in Society; Penang, Malaysia: Third World Network, 2003. ISBN 0-9544923-0-7.
- Mae-Wan Ho, Sam Burcher, Rhea Gala and Vejko Velkovic. Unraveling AIDS: the independent science and promising alternative therapies, Ridgefield, CT: Vital Health Pub., 2005. ISBN 1-890612-47-2.
- Mae- Wan Ho, Peter Saunders. Beyond Neo-Darwinism: An Introduction to the New Evolutionary Paradigm, London: Academic Press, 1984. ISBN 978-0123500809
