= Robin Ferrier =

New Zealand chemist (1932–2013)

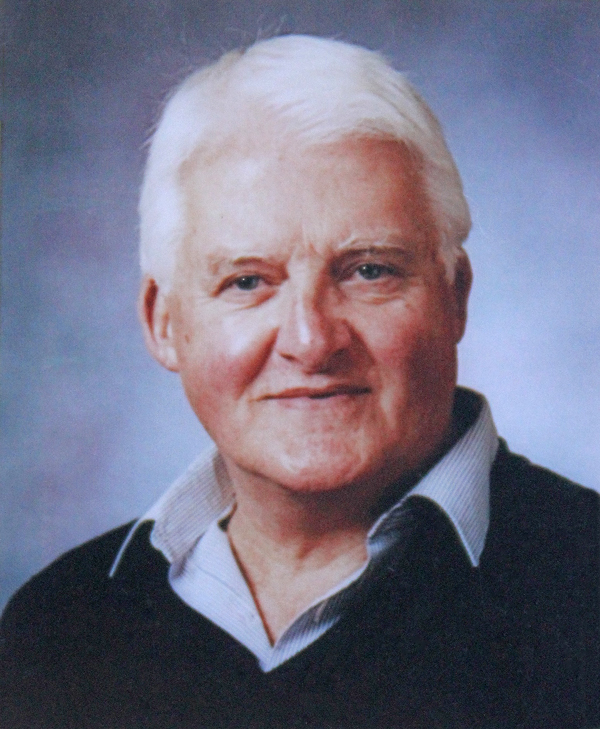
- Born: Robert John Ferrier; 7 August 1932; Edinburgh, Scotland
- Died: 11 July 2013 (aged 80); Wellington, New Zealand
- Other names: Robert John; Robin Ferrier
- Citizenship: New Zealand
- Education: University of Edinburgh
- Spouse: Carolyn Louise Tompkins
- Children: 2
- Scientific career
- Fields: Chemistry
- Workplaces: Birkbeck College, University of London; Victoria University of Wellington
- Doctoral advisor: Professor Gerald Aspinall
- Doctoral students: Richard Furneaux

Robert John Ferrier FRSNZ, FNZIC, (7 August 1932 – 11 July 2013) was an organic chemist who discovered two chemical reactions, the Ferrier rearrangement and the Ferrier carbocyclization. Originally from Edinburgh, he moved to Wellington, New Zealand, in 1970.

== Early life and education ==
Ferrier was born in Edinburgh on 7 August 1932. Following the family's idiosyncratic naming tradition, although he was named Robert John, he was always known as Robin. Likewise his father Edward was known as William and his mother Sophia was known as Rita. William was a policeman and became head of Edinburgh CID, while Rita was a housewife.

His only sibling was a fraternal twin sister Dr Barbara M. Ferrier (d. 2006), known as Ray, who likewise became an organic chemist, becoming professor emeritus of the Department of Biochemistry and Biomedical Sciences at McMaster University. A polycyclic ketone "barbaralone", related to bullvalene was named after her.

Ferrier attended George Heriot's School for all of his schooling, apart from a brief time in Traquair, to where he was evacuated during the war with his mother and sister.

He gained a Bachelor of Science with first class honours in 1954 and a PhD in plant polysaccharides in 1957, under Professor Gerald Aspinall.

== Academic career ==
Appointed to a teaching position at Birkbeck College, University of London, Ferrier's focus turned from polysaccharides to monosaccharides. New laboratory tools and methods enabled their reactions and mechanisms to be studied like normal organic compounds, rather than a separate field, and he pioneered this approach. In the early 1960s as a NATO Post Doctoral Fellow, he worked in Professor Melvin Calvin’s group at the University of California, Berkeley. They were exciting times. While Ferrier was there, Calvin was awarded the Nobel Prize for Chemistry, and he also met Carolyn Tompkins, the pair marrying in Edinburgh in 1962.

Arriving in New Zealand in 1970 as Victoria University’s first chair of organic chemistry, Ferrier continued to lead work on the monosaccharides, specialising in their use as starting materials for the synthesis of non-carbohydrate compounds of pharmaceutical interest. He had previously clarified the mechanism of the Fischer glycosidation and discovered an allylic rearrangement reaction of glycals, now known as the Ferrier rearrangement – the first of two reactions that bear his name. Many of Ferrier's best discoveries were made by following up unexpected chemical observations, which often led him into uncharted territory. His second ‘name’ reaction, the Ferrier carbocyclization, was the result of this approach.

He served on the Toxic Substances Board in the 1980s and the leadership of the RSNZ report Lead in the Environment that confirmed the toxic effects of lead and began the phase-out of leaded petrol.

After his retirement from Victoria University in 1998, he became an emeritus professor. Ferrier then entered what he referred to as his 'supposed retirement', working with the carbohydrate chemists at Industrial Research Ltd. Here he continued to foster the next generation of carbohydrate chemists in New Zealand – his 'grandchildren', instilling his rigorous approach to chemistry with mentoring and assistance with the group's publications.

== Ferrier Research Institute ==
The Ferrier Research Institute at Victoria University of Wellington was named for Ferrier. It was created on 6 January 2014 to accommodate the group of carbohydrate chemists who left Callaghan Innovation on that date. (Callaghan Innovation was previously Industrial Research Ltd.)

== Ferrier Lecture ==
In August 2012, Ferrier celebrated his 80th birthday and retired a second time. Later that year, the Ferrier Trust was set up in his honour, to bring a scientist to New Zealand each year, to engage with chemistry students and lecture. Peppi Prasit, a Ferrier PhD graduate and founder of Amira Pharmaceuticals and Inception Sciences in the US, was the trust's foundation donor. He was able to attend the inaugural Ferrier Lecture in March 2013.

== Publications ==
In his 50-year career, Ferrier published 180 papers, reviews and books, and gave 10 invited plenary lectures at international symposia. His reviews were of particular benefit to the chemical community but perhaps of most value was the book "Monosaccharide Chemistry, written with Dr Peter Collins in 1972 and majorly updated as "Monosaccharides: Their chemistry and their roles in natural products in 1995.

== Awards ==
Ferrier was elected Fellow of the Royal Society of New Zealand (1977) and the New Zealand Institute of Chemistry (1972) and awarded a DSc (London, 1968).
