= Ferrier carbocyclization =

Organic reaction

The Ferrier carbocyclization (or Ferrier II reaction) is an organic reaction that was first reported by the carbohydrate chemist Robert J. Ferrier in 1979. It is a metal-mediated rearrangement of enol ether pyrans to cyclohexanones. Typically, this reaction is catalyzed by mercury salts, specifically mercury(II) chloride.

Several reviews have been published.

== Reaction mechanism ==
Ferrier proposed the following reaction mechanism:

In this mechanism, the terminal olefin undergoes hydroxymercuration to produce the first intermediate, compound 2, a hemiacetal. Next, methanol is lost and the dicarbonyl compound cyclizes through an attack on the electrophilic aldehyde to form the carbocycle as the product. A downside to this reaction is that the loss of CH_{3}OH at the anomeric position (carbon-1) results in a mixture of α- and β-anomers. The reaction also works for substituted alkenes (e. g. having an -OAc group on the terminal alkene).

Ferrier also reported that the final product, compound 5, could be converted into a conjugated ketone (compound 6) by reaction with acetic anhydride (Ac_{2}O) and pyridine, as shown below.

== Modifications ==
In 1997, Sinaÿ and co-workers reported an alternative route to the synthesis (shown below) that did not involve cleavage of the bond at the anomeric position (the glycosidic bond). In this case, the major product formed had maintained its original configuration at the anomeric position.

(Bn = benzyl, i-Bu = isobutyl)

Sinaÿ proposed this reaction went through the following transition state:

Sinaÿ also discovered that titanium (IV) derivatives such as [TiCl_{3}(OiPr)] worked in the same reaction as a milder version of the Lewis acid, i-Bu_{3}Al, which goes through a similar transition state involving the retention of configuration at the anomeric center.

In 1988, Adam reported a modification of the reaction that used catalytic amounts of palladium (II) salts, which brought about the same conversion of enol ethers into carbosugars in a more environmentally friendly manner.

== Applications ==
The development of the Ferrier carbocyclization has been useful for the synthesis of numerous natural products that contain the carbocycle group. In 1991, Bender and co-workers reported a synthetic route to pure enantiomers of myo-inositol derivatives using this reaction. It has also been applied to the synthesis of aminocyclitols in work done by Barton and co-workers. Finally, Amano et al. used the Ferrier conditions to synthesise complex conjugated cyclohexanones in 1998.
