= Βk-BDB =

βk-BDB

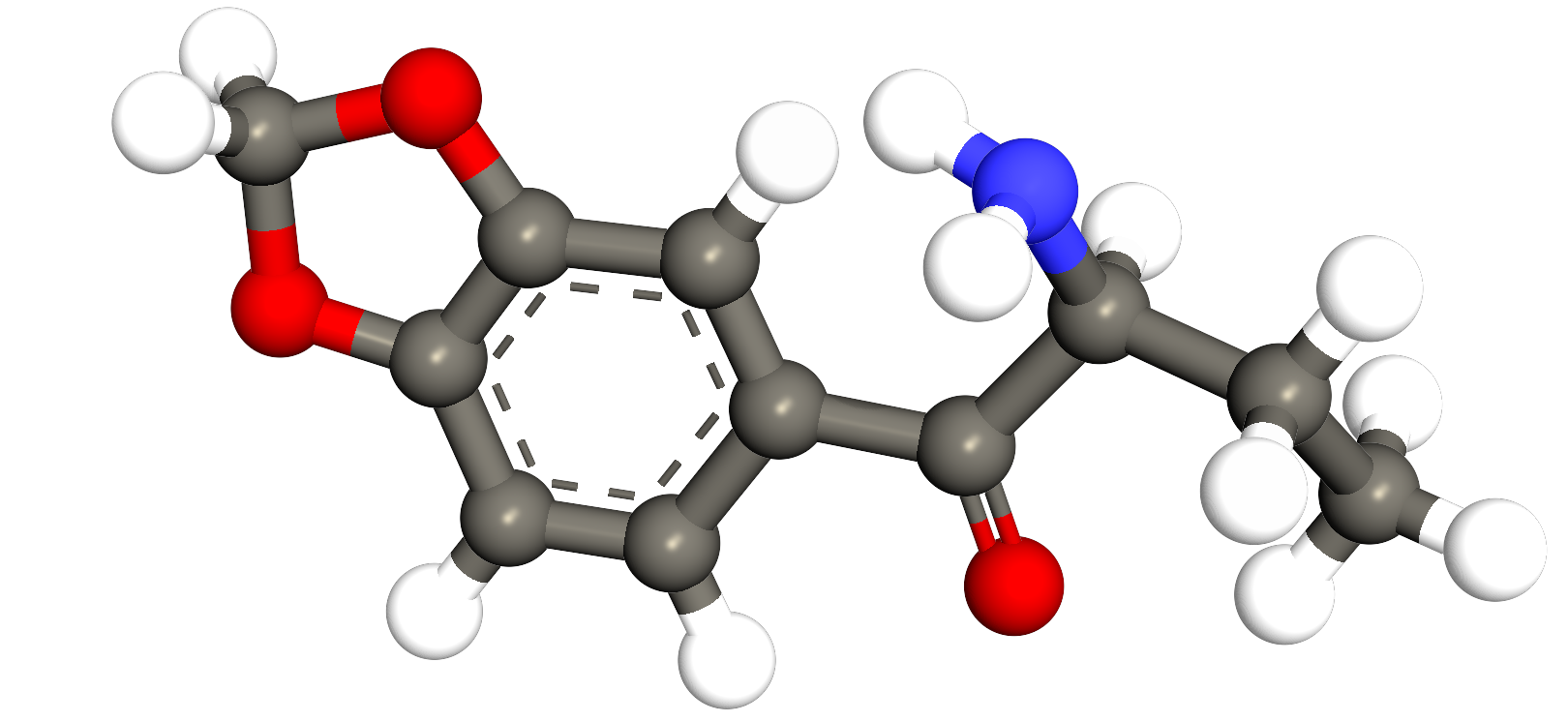

Clinical data
- Other names: bk-BDB; MD-BP; 3′,4′-Methylenedioxy-2-aminobutanophenone
- ATC code: None

Legal status
- Legal status: Illegal in Russia, Japan

Identifiers
- IUPAC name: 2-Amino-1-(1,3-benzodioxol-5-yl)butan-1-one
- CAS Number: 1213250-93-1
- PubChem CID: 102362578
- ChemSpider: 26954708
- UNII: 4LQE09H5G4
- CompTox Dashboard (EPA): DTXSID901358548

Chemical and physical data
- Formula: C_{11}H_{13}NO_{3}
- Molar mass: 207.229 g·mol^{−1}
- 3D model (JSmol): Interactive image
- SMILES: CCC(C(=O)C1=CC2=C(C=C1)OCO2)N
- InChI: InChI=1S/C11H13NO3/c1-2-8(12)11(13)7-3-4-9-10(5-7)15-6-14-9/h3-5,8H,2,6,12H2,1H3; Key:LPWAUWDHBUIFEE-UHFFFAOYSA-N

β-Keto-1,3-benzodioxolylbutanamine (βk-BDB) is a minor metabolite formed by N-demethylation of butylone (βk-MBDB).

βk-BDB belongs to the substituted cathinones and substituted methylenedioxyphenylethylamines and can be characterized as an N-demethyl derivative of butylone, or as one of the possible homologues of methylone and ethylone, or as a beta-keto derivative of 1,3-benzodioxolylbutanamine (BDB).

== See also ==
- Substituted cathinone
- Substituted methylenedioxyphenethylamine
- Substituted phenylisobutylamine
