= Phosphinothricin acetyltransferase =

Identifiers
- EC no.: 2.3.1.183

Databases
- IntEnz: IntEnz view
- BRENDA: BRENDA entry
- ExPASy: NiceZyme view
- KEGG: KEGG entry
- MetaCyc: metabolic pathway
- PRIAM: profile
- PDB structures: RCSB PDB PDBe PDBsum
Search
- PMC: articles
- PubMed: articles
- NCBI: proteins

Phosphinothricin acetyltransferase (EC 2.3.1.183, PAT, PPT acetyltransferase, Pt-N-acetyltransferase, ac-Pt) is an enzyme with systematic name acetyl-CoA:phosphinothricin N-acetyltransferase. This enzyme catalyses the following chemical reaction

acetyl-CoA + phosphinothricin $\rightleftharpoons$ CoA + N-acetylphosphinothricin

The substrate phosphinothricin is used as a nonselective herbicide and is a potent inhibitor of EC 6.3.1.2.

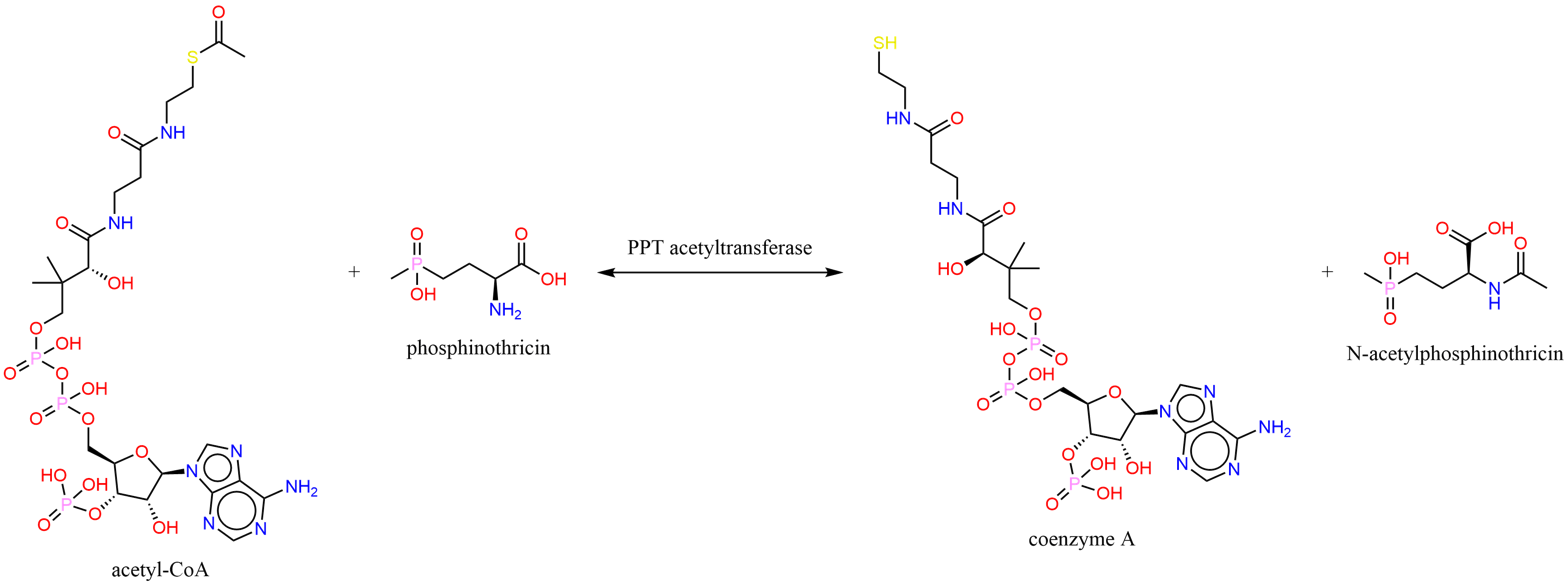
Reaction.
