= Ferrier rearrangement =

Organic reaction

Named after	Robert J. Ferrier
Reaction type	Rearrangement reaction

Identifiers
RSC ontology ID	RXNO:0000229

The Ferrier rearrangement is an organic reaction that involves a nucleophilic substitution reaction combined with an allylic shift in a glycal (a 2,3-unsaturated glycoside). It was discovered by the carbohydrate chemist Robert J. Ferrier.

A typical Ferrier rearrangement

== Mechanism ==
In the first step, a delocalized allyloxocarbenium ion (2) is formed, typically with the aid of a Lewis acid like indium(III) chloride or boron trifluoride. This ion reacts in situ with an alcohol, yielding a mixture of the α (3) and β (4) anomers of the 2-glycoside, with the double bond shifted to position 3,4.

== Examples ==
Lewis acid	Alcohol	Conditions	Results
InCl_{3}	methanol	in dichloromethane	α:β = 7:1
dioxane	water	heating	75% yield
SnCl_{4}	methanol	in dichloromethane, –78 °C, 10 min	83% yield, α:β = 86:14
BF_{3}·O(C_{2}H_{5})_{2}	isopropanol	in dichloromethane, RT, 24 hr	95% yield
ZnCl_{2}	ethanol	in toluene, RT, 30–60 min	65–95% yield, α:β = 89:11
BF_{3}·O(C_{2}H_{5})_{2}	benzyl alcohol	in dichloromethane, –20 °C to RT, 1 hr	98% yield

== Modifications ==
=== Forming of C-glycosides ===
By replacing the alcohol with a silane, C-glycosides can be formed. With triethylsilane (R'=H), the reaction yields a 2,3-unsaturated deoxy sugar.

Forming of a C-glycoside via Ferrier rearrangement

=== Nitrogen analogue ===
An analogous reaction with nitrogen as the heteroatom was described in 1984 for the synthesis of the antibiotic substance streptazolin.

Nitrogen analogue of the Ferrier rearrangement
