= Bialaphos =

Names
- Systematic IUPAC name (2S)-2-[(2S)-2-{(2S)-2-Amino-4-[hydroxy(methylphosphonoyl)]butanamido}propanamido]propanoic acid
- Other names L-Alanyl-L-alanyl-phosphinothricin

Identifiers
| CAS Number | 35597-43-4 |
| 3D model (JSmol) | Interactive image |
| ChemSpider | 4575372 |
| ECHA InfoCard | 100.113.731 |
| PubChem CID | 5462314 |
| UNII | 7488PCM6I2 |
| CompTox Dashboard (EPA) | DTXSID5058066 |
- InChI: InChI=1S/C11H22N3O6P/c1-6(9(15)14-7(2)11(17)18)13-10(16)8(12)4-5-21(3,19)20/h6-8H,4-5,12H2,1-3H3,(H,13,16)(H,14,15)(H,17,18)(H,19,20)/t6-,7-,8-/m0/s1 Key: GINJFDRNADDBIN-FXQIFTODSA-N; InChI=1/C11H22N3O6P/c1-6(9(15)14-7(2)11(17)18)13-10(16)8(12)4-5-21(3,19)20/h6-8H,4-5,12H2,1-3H3,(H,13,16)(H,14,15)(H,17,18)(H,19,20)/t6-,7-,8-/m0/s1 Key: GINJFDRNADDBIN-FXQIFTODBR
- SMILES: O=C(O)[C@@H](NC(=O)[C@@H](NC(=O)[C@@H](N)CCP(=O)(O)C)C)C

Properties
| Chemical formula | C_{11}H_{22}N_{3}O_{6}P |
| Molar mass | 323.286 g·mol^{−1} |
| Density | 1.33 g/mL |
- Except where otherwise noted, data are given for materials in their standard state (at 25 °C [77 °F], 100 kPa). Infobox references

Bialaphos is a natural herbicide produced by the bacteria Streptomyces hygroscopicus and Streptomyces viridochromogenes. It is also known by the ISO common name bilanafos. Bialaphos is a protoxin and nontoxic as is. When it is metabolized by a plant, the glutamic acid analog glufosinate is released which inhibits glutamine synthetase. This results in the accumulation of ammonium and disruption of primary metabolism.

Bialaphos is made up of two alanine residues and glufosinate, and is commonly used as a selection marker in plants. Resistance plasmids include pGreenII 0229 and pGreenII 0229 62-SK. pGreenII 0229 is derived from pGreenII 0000, a nos-bar cassette has been inserted into the HpaI site of the left border, providing resistance to bialaphos or phosphinothricin during plant transformation selection. pGreenII 0229 62-SK is derived from pGreenII 0229, the LacZ blue/white cloning selection has been replaced with a 35S-MCS-CaMV cassette that allows the insertion of a gene of interest into a 35S overexpression cassette.

== See also ==
- Phosalacine, a related tripeptide
