= Streptazolin =

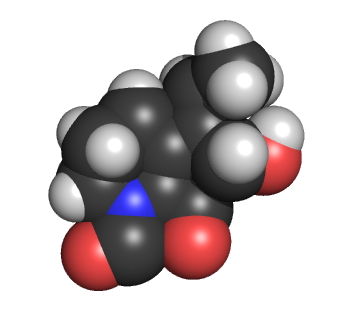

Names
- Preferred IUPAC name (2aS,2a^{1}S,3S,4Z)-4-Ethylidene-3-hydroxy-2a,2a^{1},3,4,6,7-hexahydro-1H-2-oxa-7a-azacyclopenta[cd]inden-1-one

Identifiers
CAS Number	80152-07-4
3D model (JSmol)	Interactive image
ChEMBL	ChEMBL450203
ChemSpider	9944359
PubChem CID	11769676
- InChI: InChI=1S/C11H13NO3/c1-2-6-7-4-3-5-12-8(7)10(9(6)13)15-11(12)14/h2,4, 8-10,13H,3,5H2,1H3/b6-2-/t8-,9-,10-/m0/s1 Key: OJIUACOQFBQCDF-IKXJTIOISA-N
- SMILES: C=3CCN1C(=O)OC2C1C=3\C(=C\C)\C2O

Properties
Chemical formula	C_{11}H_{13}NO_{3}
Molar mass	207.229 g·mol^{−1}
- Except where otherwise noted, data are given for materials in their standard state (at 25 °C [77 °F], 100 kPa). Infobox references

Streptazolin is an antibiotic and antifungal substance isolated in 1981 from Streptomyces viridochromogenes.

Because of its tendency to polymerize, it is not suitable for therapeutic use. 1,4-Reduction of the conjugated diene gives dihydrostreptazolin which is stable, but has very limited antimicrobial properties.

(+)-Dihydrostreptazolin

The first total synthesis of racemic streptazolin was achieved in 1985 with the aid of a modified Ferrier rearrangement.
