= Deepak Nayyar =

Indian economist

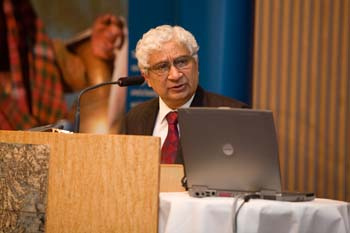
- Deepak Nayyar at UNU-WIDER Annual Lecture, 2009.
- Born: 26 September 1946 (age 80)
- Spouse: Rohini Nayyar

Academic background
- Education: St. Stephen's College, Delhi; Delhi University; Balliol College, University of Oxford
- Influences: Paul Streeten

Academic work
- Discipline: Macroeconomics, International Economics, Development Economics
- Institutions: Jawaharlal Nehru University, New Delhi
- Awards: Honorary Fellow of Balliol College, Oxford

Deepak Nayyar (born 26 September 1946) is an Indian economist and an academic. He is currently Chair of the Board of Trustees, Institute for Development Studies, Sussex, United Kingdom (since August 2020); Emeritus Professor of Economics, Jawaharlal Nehru University, New Delhi; Honorary Fellow of Balliol College, Oxford; and Distinguished Fellow, Centre for the Study of Developing Societies, New Delhi. Earlier, he taught at the University of Oxford, the University of Sussex, the Indian Institute of Management Calcutta (IIM-C). He also served as Vice-Chancellor, University of Delhi.

Nayyar was Distinguished University Professor of Economics, New School for Social Research, New York. He was invited to the Kluge Chair in Countries and Cultures of the South at the United States Library of Congress in Washington DC for 2022-23. Nayyar’s professional life in academia has been interspersed with time in the world of public policy and in government.

Before turning to academics, Nayyar was a Member of the Indian Administrative Service (IAS), and worked in the State of Uttar Pradesh (1969 to 1973). Later, he served as Economic Adviser to the Ministry of Commerce in the Government of India (1983 to 1985) and, subsequently, as Chief Economic Adviser to the Government of India and Secretary, Ministry of Finance, New Delhi (1989 to 1991).

== Early life and education ==
Nayyar’s schooling began in Shimla, “followed by eight years in Hindi-medium schools at different places in provincial India. He completed it at St Xavier’s School, Jaipur, where Father Extross was his mentor for the next stage of his journey in life”. He went on to complete a Bachelor of Arts (BA) Honors in Economics in 1965 and Master of Arts (MA) in Economics in 1967, from St. Stephen's College, University of Delhi. Bagging the coveted Rhodes Scholarship, he went on to study at Balliol College, University of Oxford, where he obtained a Bachelor of Philosophy (B.Phil.) in Economics in 1969 and a Doctor of Philosophy (D. Phil) in 1973. His D.Phil thesis was on ‘India’s Exports and Export Policies in the 1960s’ completed under the supervision of Paul Streeten.

== Career ==
Nayyar has had a career that includes academia, government service, and corporate boards. His career has also been marked by his presence in several commissions and committees of the Government of India, committees for review and evaluation of several institutions of higher learning and universities, and editorial board of several academic journals.

Academia

Nayyar served as a Research Fellow, Queen Elizabeth House, University of Oxford, from 1972 to 1973 and as a Lecturer in Economics at the University of Sussex between 1973 and 1980. Thereafter, he became Professor of Economics at the Indian Institute of Management (IIM), Calcutta, till 1983. He was Professor of Economics (and Chairman 1987-1989) at the Centre for Economic Studies and Planning (CESP), Jawaharlal Nehru University (JNU), New Delhi, from 1986 to 1989; 1992 to 2000; and 2005 to 2011. He served as Vice-Chancellor, University of Delhi from May 2000 to May 2005. He was Distinguished University Professor of Economics, New School for Social Research, New York, from 2008 to 2012.

Institutional Affiliations – Indian

Nayyar is currently Chairman (2005 onwards) and Trustee (from 1992), Sameeksha Trust, Mumbai, which publishes Economic & Political Weekly (EPW); Chairman (2013 onwards) and Trustee (2002 to 2012), Nehru Trust for Cambridge University; Chairman, Indian National Trust for Education and Development, New Delhi (2014 onwards); Chairman, Board of Governors (2014 onwards) and Member of the Board (2012 to 2014), Centre for the Study of Developing Societies (CSDS), New Delhi; Chairman, Board of Governors, Institute for Human Development, New Delhi (2023 onwards); and Emeritus Professor of Economics, Jawaharlal Nehru University, New Delhi (since 2012).

He was also President, Indian Society for Labour Economics (2015 to 2025); and Member of the Governing Council and the Executive Committee, Indian National Trust for Art and Cultural Heritage (2016 to 2025);

Institutional Affiliations – International

Currently, Nayyar is the Chairman, Board of Trustees, Institute for Development Studies, Sussex (since August 2020). He served as Chairman of the Board of Governors of the World Institute for Development Economics Research (UNU-WIDER), Helsinki (2001 to 2008); Chairman of the Advisory Council (2004 to 2007) and Member (2001 to 2004), Department of International Development, Queen Elizabeth House, University of Oxford; Member of the Board of Directors, Social Science Research Council, New York (2001 to 2007); Member of the Administrative Board and Vice President, International Association of Universities, Paris (2004 to 2008); Vice Chairman (2011 to 2014) and Member (2005 to 2011) of the Board, South Centre, Geneva; Visiting Professor, Sciences-Po, Paris (May–June 2008); and Member of the World Commission on the Social Dimensions of Globalization established by the International Labour Organisation (ILO) (2002 to 2004).

Services in Government

Nayyar became a Member of the Indian Administrative Service (IAS), Government of India in 1969 which he left in 1973. He served as the Economic Adviser to the Government of India, Ministry of Commerce, New Delhi from 1983 to 1985; and then as the Chief Economic Adviser (CEA) to the Government of India and Permanent Secretary, Ministry of Finance, New Delhi, from 1989 to 1991.

Committees and Commissions - India

Nayyar was the Chairman of Review Committee, Indian Council for Social Science Research, New Delhi (2011); Member of the National Knowledge Commission, India (2005 to 2009); Member, Apex Committee, Commonwealth Games 2010, New Delhi (2006 to 2008); Member of the Pay Commission for the Public Sector, Government of India (1996-1998); Member of the Governing Council for Indian Council of Social Science Research, New Delhi (1993 to 1996); Member of the Technology, Information, Forecasting and Assessment Council, Government of India (1987 to 1993); Member of the Review Committee for the Council for Scientific and Industrial Research India (1986); Chairman of the Committee on Export Processing Zones, Government of India (1985); Member of the Expert Committee on the Textile Industry, Government of India (1985) and of the Committee to Review the Implementation of Textile Policy, Government of India (1989); and Member-Secretary of the Committee on Trade Policies Government of India (1984).

Committees and Commissions – International

Nayyar was a Member of Evaluation Committee, Institute of Social Studies, The Hague (2012); Chairman of the Working Groups on Labour Mobility and Construction and Engineering Services for the Group of Negotiations on Services, Uruguay Round of Multilateral Trade Negotiations, Geneva (1989 to 1990); and Member of the North-South Roundtable on Trade (1986 to 1989).

Corporate Boards

Nayyar has also served as the member of Board of Directors of several companies: Press Trust of India (2015 onwards), Oil and Natural Gas Corporation (2011 to 2014), Steel Authority of India Limited (2006 to 2009, 2010 to 2013), ICRA (2002 to 2014), Maruti Udyog (1990 and 1991), Export-Import Bank of India (1990 and 1991), State Bank of India (1987 to 1990), State Trading Corporation of India (1983 to 1985), Jute Corporation of India (1983 to 1985), and Cotton Corporation of India (1983 to 1985).

== Awards and honours ==
Nayyar has been invited to the Kluge Chair in Countries and Cultures of the South at the United States Library of Congress in Washington DC for 2022-23. He was bestowed with the coveted Malcolm Adiseshiah Award in 2019 recognising his Lifetime Contribution to Development Studies. He was awarded the Order of Merit of the Italian Republic, L’Onorificenza di Cavaliere, conferred by the President of Italy in 2007, and received the VKRV Rao Award in 1989 for his contribution to research in Economics. He was a Rhodes Scholar from India at Oxford (1967 to 1969). He was President of Indian Economic Association in 1995.

In his honour, Ananya Ghosh Dastidar, Rajeev Malhotra and Vivek Suneja edited a book titled Economic Theory and Policy amidst Global Discontent, Essays in Honor of Deepak Nayyar, published by Routledge, London, in 2018. Eminent economists from across the globe had contributed to this volume.

== Publications ==
A. Books - Authored

1. Resurgent Asia: Diversity in Development, Oxford University Press, Oxford, 2019, Paperback Edition, 2023.
2. Employment, Growth and Development, Routledge, London and New York, 2017.
3. Catch Up: Developing Countries in the World Economy, Oxford University Press, Oxford and New York, 2013, Paperback Edition, 2016.
4. Liberalization and Development, Oxford University Press, Delhi, 2008, Paperback Edition, 2012.
5. Trade and Globalization, Oxford University Press, Delhi, 2008, Paperback Edition, 2012.
6. Stability with Growth: Macroeconomics, Liberalization and Development, co-authors Joseph Stiglitz, Jose Antonio Ocampo, Shari Spiegel and Ricardo French Davis, Oxford University Press, Oxford, 2006.
7. The Intelligent Person's Guide to Liberalization, co-author Amit Bhaduri, Penguin Books, 1996.
8. Economic Liberalization in India: Analytics, Experience and Lessons, Orient Longman, Calcutta, 1995.
9. Migration, Remittances and Capital Flows: The Indian Experience, Oxford University Press, Delhi, 1994.
10. India's Exports and Export Policies in the 1960s, Cambridge University Press, Cambridge, 1976, Paperback Edition, 2008.

B. Books - Edited

1. Asian Transformations: An Inquiry into the Development of Nations, Oxford University Press, Oxford, 2019.
2. Macroeconomics and Human Development, Taylor and Francis, London, 2013.
3. Governing Globalization: Issues and Institutions, Oxford University Press, Oxford, 2002
4. Economics as Ideology and Experience, Frank Cass, London, 1998.
5. Trade and Industrialization, Oxford University Press, Delhi, 1997.
6. Industrial Growth and Stagnation: The Debate in India, Oxford University Press, Bombay, 1994.
7. Economic Relations between Socialist Countries and the Third World, Macmillan, London, 1977.

C. Articles in Journals

1. "A World Order in Crisis and Transition: Contemplating Its Future", Economic and Political Weekly, 4 January 2025 and Brazilian Journal of Political Economy, April–June 2025.
2. “Made in India: Industrial Policy in a Changing World”, co-author Gaurav Nayyar, Journal of Industry Competition and Trade, 24:13, May 2024.
3. “Economic Policies for Human Development: A Neglected Domain”, Journal of Human Development and Capabilities, November 2023.
4. “Economic and Social Policies for Human Development”, co-author Rajeev Malhotra, Journal of Human Development and Capabilities, November 2023.
5. “Industrialization in Developing Asia since 1970: Why Technology, Leaning and Innovation Matter”, Innovation and Development, October 2021.
6. “The Coronavirus Pandemic: India in Global Perspective, co-author Ramesh Thakur, The Asia Pacific Journal, January 2021.
7. “Lives, Livelihoods and the Economy: India in Pandemic Times”, Indian Journal of Labour Economics, July 2020.
8. “The Future of Globalization: Learning from History”, Economic and Political Weekly, November 2019.
9. "Economic Liberalization in India: Then and Now", Economic and Political Weekly, 14 January 2017, pp. 41–48, reprinted in Quarter Century of Liberalization in India, Oxford University Press, New Delhi, 2018.
10. “BRICS, Developing Countries and Global Governance”, Third World Quarterly, April 2016.
11. “Birth, Life and Death of Development Finance Institutions in India”, Economic and Political Weekly, 15 August 2015.
12. “Globalization and Democracy”, Brazilian Journal of Political Economy, July–September 2015, and Economic and Political Weekly, 9 May 2015.
13. "Globalization and Employment", Indian Journal of Labour Economics, January–March 2015.
14. "Why Employment Matters: Reviving Growth and Reducing Inequality", International Labour Review, September 2014.
15. "The West and the Rest in the World Economy: The Next Transformation?”, Challenge, March–April, 2014.
16. "The Millennium Development Goals Beyond 2015: Old frameworks and New Constructs", Journal of Human Development and Capabilities, August 2013.
17. "Macroeconomics and Human Development", Journal of Human Development and Capabilities, February 2012.
18. "Economic Growth and Technological Capabilities in Emerging Economies: National Specificities and International Context", Innovation and Development, October 2011.
19. "Discrimination and Justice: Beyond Affirmative Action", Economic and Political Weekly, 15 October 2011.
20. "Rethinking Macroeconomic Policies for Development", Brazilian Journal of Political Economy, July–September 2011.
21. "The Financial Crisis, the Great Recession and the Developing World", Global Policy, January 2011.
22. "Developing Countries in the World Economy: The Future in the Past?", WIDER Annual Lecture 12, UNU-WIDER, Helsinki, 2009.
23. "Learning to Unlearn from Development", Oxford Development Studies, September 2008.
24. “Macroeconomics of Structural Adjustment and Public Finance in Developing Countries: A Heterodox Perspective”, International Journal of Development Issues, June 2008.
25. “The Internationalization of Firms from India: Investment, Mergers and Acquisitions”, Oxford Development Studies, March 2008.
26. “Globalization: What Does it Mean for Higher Education?” in Luc E. Weber and James D. Duderstadt eds. The Globalization of Higher Education, Economica, Paris and London, 2008, reprinted in Economic and Political Weekly, 15 December 2007.
27. “Macroeconomics in Developing Countries”, Banca Nazionale del Lavoro Quarterly Review, September 2007.
28. “India’s Unfinished Journey: Transforming Growth into Development”, Modern Asian Studies, July 2006.
29. “Economic Growth in Independent India: Lumbering Elephant or Running Tiger?”, Economic and Political Weekly, 15 April 2006, reprinted in P. Balakrishnan ed. Economic Reforms and Growth in India, Orient Black Swan, Hyderabad.
30. “Globalization, History and Development: A Tale of Two Centuries”, Cambridge Journal of Economics, January 2006.
31. “Economic Reforms in India: Understanding the Process and Learning from Experience”, International Journal of Development Issues, December 2004.
32. "Work, Livelihoods and Rights", Indian Journal of Labour Economics, January–March 2003.
33. "Economic Development and Political Democracy: The Interaction of Economics and Politics in Independent India", Economic and Political Weekly, December 1998, reprinted in N.G. Jayal ed. Democracy in India, Oxford University Press, Delhi, 2001.
34. "Democracy, Markets and People in the context of Globalization", Public Policy January–March 1998.
35. "Short-termism, Public Policies and Economic Development", Economies et Societies, No.1, 1998.
36. "The Washington Consensus and the Liberalization of Economies", co-author Amit Bhaduri, Revue Tiers Monde, April–June 1997.
37. "Free Trade: Why, When and For Whom?" Banca Nazionale del Lavoro Quarterly Review, September 1996.
38. "Globalization: The Past in Our Present", Indian Economic Journal, January–March 1996.
39. "Macro-Economics of Stabilisation and Adjustment. The Indian. Experience", Economie Appliquee, No.3, 1995.
40. "International Labour Movements, Trade Flows and Migration Transitions". Asia and Pacific Migration Journal, No.1, 1994.
41. “International Trade and the Agricultural Sector in India”, Economic and Political Weekly, co-author Abhijit Sen, May 14, 1994.
42. “Indian Economy at the Crossroads Illusions and Realities”, Economic and Political Weekly, April 10, 1993.
43. “Intellectual Property Rights and LDCs Some Strategic Issues”, Economic and Political Weekly, February 8, 1992.
44. "The Dunkel Text: An Assessment", Social Scientist, January–February 1992.
45. "Some Reflections on the Uruguay Round and Trade in Services", Journal of World Trade, October 1988.
46. "Political Economy of International Trade in Services", Cambridge Journal of Economics, June 1988.
47. “India’s Export Performance, 1970-85 Underlying Factors and Constraints”, Economic and Political Weekly, Annual Number, May, 1987.
48. "International Relocation of Production and Industrialization in LDCs", Economic and Political Weekly, July 1983.
49. "India's Balance of Payments", Economic and Political Weekly, Annual Number, April 1982, reprinted in D.K. Bose ed., Review of the Indian Planning Process, Indian Statistical Institute, Calcutta, 1986.
50. "Industrial Development in India: Growth or Stagnation?", Economic and Political Weekly, Special Number, August 1978, reprinted in AK. Bagchi and N. Banerji eds., Change and Choice in Indian Industry, Calcutta, 1980.
51. "Transnational Corporations and Manufactured Exports from Poor Countries", Economic Journal, March 1978.
52. "Socialist Countries and the Third World", Economic and Political Weekly, Special Number, August 1976.
53. "India’s Export Performance in the 1970s", Economic and Political Weekly, May 15, 1976.
54. "India's Trade with the Socialist Countries", World Development, May 1975.
55. "An Analysis of the Stagnation in India's Cotton Textile Exports", Oxford Bulletin of Economics and Statistics, February 1973.

D. Articles in Edited Volumes

1. “Industrialization, Hubs and Catch Up: The World Economy in Historical Perspective”, in Arkebe Oqubay and Justin Yifu Lin, eds. The Oxford Handbook of Industrial Hubs and Economic Development, Oxford University Press, Oxford, 2020.
2. “BRICS and Emerging Markets in the World Economy”, in P.B. Anand, S. Fennel and F. Comim eds. Handbook of BRICS and Emerging Economies, Oxford University Press, Oxford, 2020.
3. “Globalization in Historical Perspective” in Machiko Nissanke and Jose Antonio Ocampo eds. The Palgrave Handbook of Development Economics, Springer Nature, London, 2019.
4. “Rethinking Asian Drama: Fifty Years Later”, in Deepak Nayyar ed. Asian Transformations: An Inquiry into the Development of Nations, Oxford University Press, Oxford, 2019.
5. “India’s Path to Structural Transformation: And Exception and the Rule”, in Celestin Monga and Justin Lin eds. The Oxford Handbook of Structural Transformation, Oxford University Press, Oxford, 2019.
6. "Can Catch Up Reduce Inequality?" in Peter van Bergeijk and Rolph van der Hoeven eds. Sustainable Development Goals and Income Inequality, Edward Elgar, London, 2017.
7. "Development Banks and Industrial Finance: the Indian Experience and its Lessons", in Akbar Noman and Joseph Stiglitz eds. Efficiency, Finance and Varieties of Industrial Policy, Columbia University Press, New York, 2017.
8. "A Better Future for the Bottom Billion", in R. Brian Heap ed. Smart Villages: New Thinking for Off-Grid Communities Worldwide, Banson, Cambridge, 2015.
9. “Social Development and Economic Progress: Some Reflections on the Relationship”, in Imrana Qadeer ed. India Social Development Report 2014, Oxford University Press, New Delhi, 2015.
10. "The South in the World Economy: Past, Present and Future", in Khalid Malik and Maurice Kugler eds. Human Progress and the Rising South, UNDP, New York, 2013.
11. "The Global Economic Crisis: What does it mean for the Developing World?", in Michael Cohen ed. The Global Economic Crisis in Latin America, Routledge, London, 2012.
12. "The Emerging Asian Giants and Economic Development in Africa", in Akbar Noman, Kwesi Botchwey, Howard Stein and Joseph Stiglitz eds. Good Growth and Governance in Africa: Rethinking Development Strategies, Oxford University Press, Oxford, 2012.
13. "China, India, Brazil and South Africa in the World Economy: Engines of Growth?" in Amelia Santos-Paulino and Guanghua Wan eds. Southern Engines of Global Growth, Oxford University Press, Oxford, 2010.
14. "Economic Growth and Technological Capabilities in BRICs: Implications for Latecomers to Industrialization", in Xialon Fu and Luc Soete eds. The Rise of Technological Power in the South, Palgrave Macmillan, London, 2010.
15. “The Rise of China and India: Implications for Developing Countries”, in Philip Artesis and John Eatwell eds. Issues in Economic Development and Globalization, Palgrave, London, 2008.
16. “International Migration and Economic Development”, in Joseph Stiglitz and Narcis Serra eds. The Washington Consensus Reconsidered: Towards a New Global Governance, Oxford University Press, Oxford, 2008.
17. “Globalization: What Does it Mean for Higher Education?” in Luc E. Weber and James D. Duderstadt eds. The Globalization of Higher Education, Economica, Paris and London, 2008, reprinted in Economic and Political Weekly, 15 December 2007.
18. “Development through Globalization?” in George Mavrotas and Anthony Shorrocks eds. Advancing Development: Core Themes in Global Economics, Palgrave, London, 2007.
19. “Globalization and Free Trade: Theory, History and Reality”, in Anwar Shaikh ed. Globalization and Myths of Free Trade, Palgrave, London, 2007.
20. “India 2025: Illusions, Realities and Dreams”, in B.G.Verghese, ed. Tomorrow’s India:Another Tryst with Destiny, Penguin Books, New Delhi, 2006.
21. “Globalization and Development in the Long Twentieth Century”, in K.S.Jomo ed. Globalization under Hegemony, Oxford University Press, Delhi, 2005.
22. "Globalization and Development", in Ha-Joon Chang ed. Rethinking Development Economics, Anthem Press, London, 2004.
23. "On Exclusion and Inclusion: Democracy, Markets and People", in A. K. Dutt and J. Ros eds. Development Economics and Structuralist Macroeconomics, Edward Elgar, Cheltenham, 2003.
24. "Globalization and Development Strategies", in J. Toye ed. Trade and Development: New Directions for the Twenty-first Century, Edward Elgar, Cheltenham, 2002.
25. "Capital Controls and the World Financial Authority: What can we learn from the Indian Experience?" in J. Eatwell and L. Taylor eds. International Capital Markets: Systems in Transition, Oxford University Press, New York, 2002.
26. "Globalization: What does it mean for Development?" in K.S. Jomo and S. Nagaraj eds. Globalization versus Development, Palgrave, London, 2001.
27. "Macroeconomic Reforms in India: Short-term Effects and Long-run Implications", in W. Mahmud ed. Adjustment and Beyond: The Reform Experience in South Asia, Palgrave, London, 2000.
28. "What can we Learn from the Asian Development Experience?" in M. Formiga and I. Sachs eds. Celso Furtado: A Tribute, Sudene, Recife, 2000.
29. "International trade and Factor Mobility", in Deepak Nayyar ed. Economics as Ideology and Experience, Frank Cass, London, 1998.
30. "Globalization: The Game, the Players and the Rules", in S.D. Gupta ed. The Political Economy of Globalization, Kluwer Academic Publishers, Dordrecht, 1997.
31. "Themes in Trade and Industrialization", in Deepak Nayyar ed. Trade and Industrialization, Oxford University Press, Delhi, 1997.
32. "Implications of NAFTA for South Asia", in ESCAP, Implications of the North American Free Trade Agreement for the Asian and Pacific Region, United Nations, New York, 1995.
33. "International Trade and the Agricultural Sector in India", in G.S. Bhalla ed. Economic Liberalisation and Indian Agriculture, ISID-FAO, New Delhi, 1994.
34. "The Foreign Trade Sector, Planning and Industrialization in India", in T.J. Byres ed., The State and Development Planning in India, Oxford University Press, Delhi, 1993.
35. "Comparative National Approaches to Intellectual Property Rights: India" in M.B. Wallerstein et al eds. Global Dimensions of Intellectual Property Rights in Science and Technology, National Academy of Sciences Press, Washington DC, 1993.
36. "Towards a Possible Multilateral Framework for Trade in Services: Issues and Concepts", in UNCTAD, Technology, Trade Policy and the Uruguay Round, United Nations, New York, 1989.
37. "International Labour Migration from India: A Macro-Economic Analysis", in Rashid Amjad, ed., To the Gulf and Back: Studies on the Economic Impact of Asian Labour Migration, ILO, Geneva and New Delhi, 1989.
38. "India's Export Performance: 1970-1985: Underlying Factors and Constraints", in Robert Lucas and Gustav Papanek, eds., The Indian Economy: Recent Development and Future Prospects, Westview Press, London and Oxford University Press, Delhi, 1988.
39. "East-South Trade" in S. Lall and F. Stewart, eds., Theory and Reality in Development, Essays in Honour of Paul Streeten, Macmillan, London, 1985.
40. "East-West-South: Interests and Prospects: A Note", in C. Saunders, Ed., East-West-South: Economic Interaction between Three Worlds, Macmillan, London, 1981.
