= Transfer DNA binary system =

A transfer DNA (T-DNA) binary system is a pair of plasmids consisting of a T-DNA binary vector and a vir helper plasmid. The two plasmids are used together (thus binary) to produce genetically modified plants. They are artificial vectors that have been derived from the naturally occurring Ti plasmid found in bacterial species of the genus Agrobacterium, such as A. tumefaciens. The binary vector is a shuttle vector, so-called because it is able to replicate in multiple hosts (e.g. Escherichia coli and Agrobacterium).

Systems in which T-DNA and vir genes are located on separate replicons are called T-DNA binary systems. T-DNA is located on the binary vector (the non-T-DNA region of this vector containing origin(s) of replication that could function both in E. coli and Agrobacterium, and antibiotic resistance genes used to select for the presence of the binary vector in bacteria, became known as vector backbone sequences). The replicon containing the vir genes became known as the vir helper plasmid. The vir helper plasmid is considered disarmed if it does not contain oncogenes that could be transferred to a plant

== Background of Agrobacterium-mediated transformation ==
The transfer DNA binary system is derived from the naturally occurring Agrobacterium tumefaciens infection mechanism of plants. Agrobacterium is a parasitic bacterium that naturally occurs in soils and infects plant cells to utilize their biological processes and machinery, integrating its own genetic material into the genome of the plant cell to produce resources that support its survival.

=== Ti plasmid ===
Agrobacterium contains a plasmid, a circular piece of DNA, called the "Tumor-inducing plasmid" ("Ti plasmid" for short). The Ti plasmid contains the following elements:

The "T-DNA" region: The T-DNA region is the section of the plasmid that becomes integrated into the genome of the host plant cell. Agrobacterium utilizes the plant's transcription and translation machinery to express the genes located within the T-DNA region. It contains the following elements:

- Left and right borders (LB and RB): The left and right borders define the boundaries of the T-DNA region. The RB acts as a starting point for the genetic transfer and the LB acts as an endpoint. The borders are recognized and cleaved by the endonucleases encoded by the virD gene.
- Auxin and cytokinin genes: These genes encode and force the plant cell to produce auxin and cytokinin, plant hormones that promote cell division and growth. By inducing cell division, the infected cells reproduce more rapidly, increasing the population of cells containing the T-DNA, consequently producing more opines. This rapid cell division leads to the formation of tumors called crown galls.
- Opine genes: The opine genes encode and force the plant cell to express enzymes that synthesize opine, a carbon- and nitrogen-rich compound that acts as a food source for Agrobacterium. After synthesis, the opines are secreted into the intercellular space and surrounding environment, allowing them to be taken-up by nearby Agrobacterium. The most common opines produced by plant cells infected with Agrobacterium DNA are nopaline and octopine.

Opine catabolism genes: The opine catabolism genes encode elements of the Agrobacterium's opine catabolism pathway. This pathway allows the bacterium to break down and use the opine as an energy source. Only carriers of this plasmid are able to metabolize opine, providing them with a competitive advantage over other soil microbes.

Vir genes cassette: The vir genes, or "virulence genes", encode elements that aid in the transfer of T-DNA from the Ti plasmid into the plant cell genome. There are 6 vir operons involved in the transfer of T-DNA: virA, virB, virG, virC, virD, and virE.

Ori: The ori is the "origin of replication", a site on the plasmid at which the two DNA strands begin to unwind to allow for DNA replication during cell division.

Bacteria are prokaryotic organisms and plants are eukaryotic organisms. Mechanisms of and machinery involved in gene expression differs in prokaryotic and eukaryotic organisms. Agrobacterium has evolved to contain eukaryotic gene elements in the T-DNA region which allows for the genes encoded in the region to be expressed by the plant cells. The remaining Ti plasmid adheres to regular prokaryotic processes.

In genetic engineering of plants, the auxin, cytokinin, and opine genes are replaced with a "gene(s) of interest", the gene(s) to be inserted into the plant. The opine catabolism genes are also removed. The transfer of the gene(s) of interest from the Agrobacterium to the plant cell occurs via the natural infection mechanism of the bacterium.

=== Infection mechanism ===
The natural mechanism of Agrobacterium infection of plant cells is mediated via the 6 vir genes located on the Ti plasmid. The process of infection occurs in 2 general steps:

1. Plant cell recognition and activation of vir gene expression: When a plant cell wall becomes damaged, phenolic compounds such as acetosyringone are released into the surrounding environment. These compounds bind to the cross-membrane receptor kinases located on the membrane of nearby Agrobacterium, signalling to the bacterium that a damaged plant cell is close by. The receptor kinases are encoded by virA. The binding of the phenolic compound to the extracellular domain of the receptor causes the intracellular domain to become phosphorylated. The phosphate group moves from the receptor to a free-floating effector protein encoded by virG. The phosphorylated effector becomes activated and binds to cis-elements within the promoter region of the remaining 4 vir genes, inducing their expression.
2. Transfer of T-DNA: The virD gene expresses an endonuclease that recognizes the RB sequence. The endonuclease cuts one strand of the RB and covalently binds to the 5' cut end of the T-DNA strand. The break in the DNA triggers the cell's natural DNA repair mechanisms, which begin to synthesize a new T-DNA strand beginning at the 3' cut end of the RB. This new strand pushes the original T-DNA strand away. As this occurs, single-stranded DNA binding proteins (ssDNA binding proteins), encoded by virE, bind along the length of the original T-DNA to stabilize it and prevent it from being degraded. Another virD endonuclease recognizes and cuts a strand in the LB, releasing the original T-DNA strand from the plasmid. The virB expresses proteins that form a transport channel between the Agrobacterium and plant cells, acting as a physical bridge along which the T-DNA moves from one organism to the other. The virC proteins aid in recruiting virD endonucleases to the borders and directing the released T-DNA to the virB transport channel.

The T-DNA then integrates into a random location within the plant cell genome.

The table below is a summary of the vir genes and their function:

Operon	Number of Genes	Type of Protein(s)	Expression Activation	Basal Expression Level	Induced Expression Level	Functional Location	Function
VirA	virA	Cross-membrane sensor kinase		Low		Membrane	Recognizes the phenolic compounds released by nearby damaged plant cells; Autophosphorylates; Transfers phosphate group to virG effector.
VirB	virB1-11		Induced by virA/G		High	Membrane	Form the Type 5 secretion system transfer channel between the Agrobacterium and plant cell.
VirC	virC1, virC2		Induced by virA/G		High	Cytoplasm	Aid in recruiting virD endonucleases to the left and right borders; Direct the T-DNA to the transport channel. VirC1 binds to the overdrive sequence, a region near the RB, to aid in T-DNA processing.
VirD	virD1-5	Helicase (virD1); Nuclease (virD2)	Induced by virA/G		High	Nucleus	VirD2 recognizes and nicks the left and right borders; Covalently binds to the 5' end of the T-DNA; Contains a nuclear localization signal to direct the T-DNA into the plant nucleus.
VirE	virE1-3	Effector (virE2)	Induced by virA/G		High	Nucleus	VirE1 prevents virE2 proteins from aggregating with themselves. VirE2 ssDNA binding proteins coat the length of the T-DNA; Stabilize T-DNA to prevent degradation.
VirG	virG	Transcriptional regulator	Induced by positive feedback loop of virA/G	Low	High	Cytoplasm	Becomes activated via phosphorylation by virA; Induces expression of vir genes.

== Components of the binary vector system ==
=== Binary vector ===
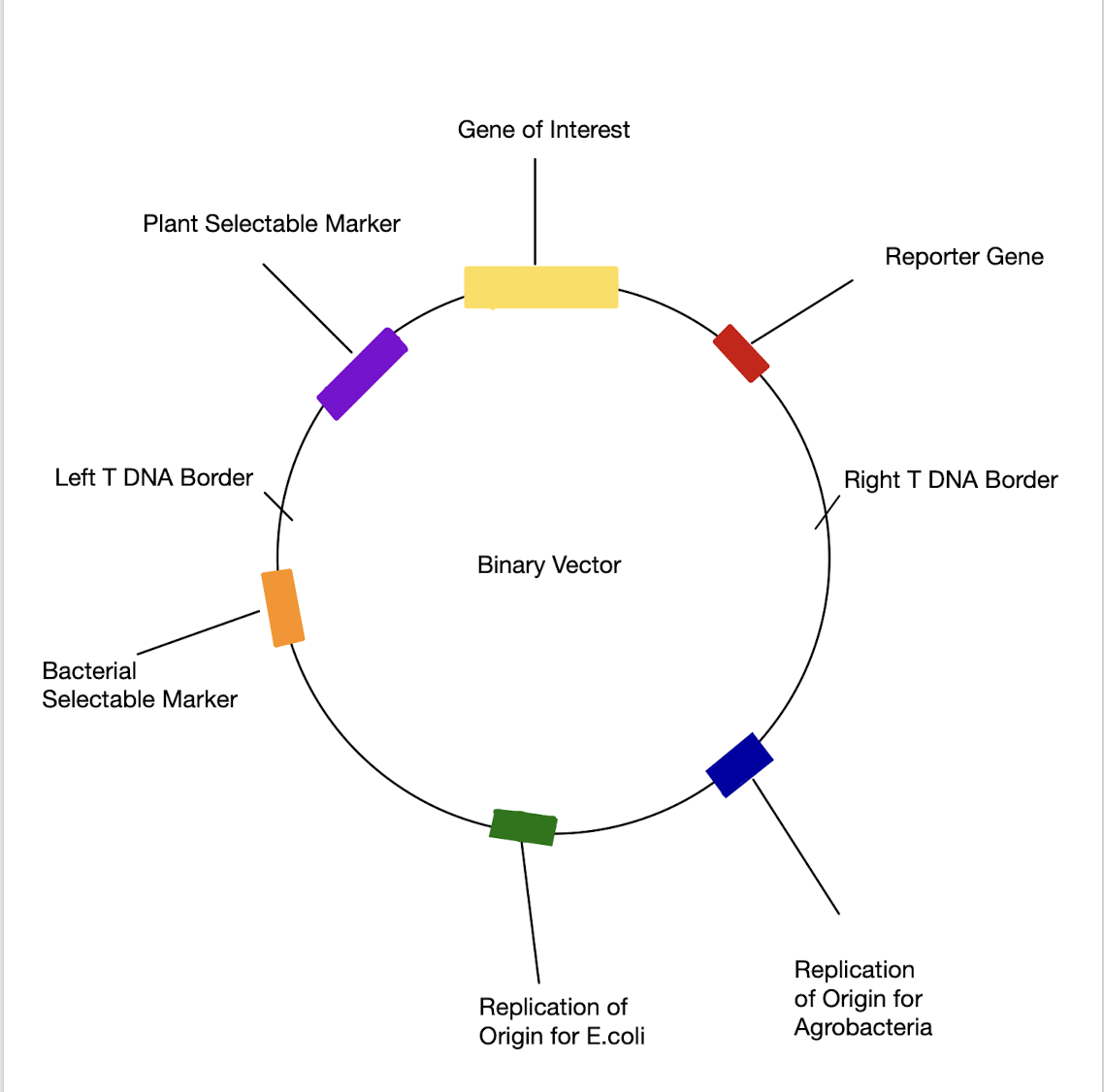
Schematic Representation of a Binary Vector Used in Agrobacterium-Mediated Plant Transformation

A binary vector is used in plant genetic engineering to transfer foreign genes into plant cells. The reason for having two separate plasmids is because it is easier to clone and manipulation of genes of interest in E. coli using the T-DNA vector because it is small and easy to work with, while the vir genes remain in Agrobacterium on the helper plasmid to help with plant transformation. The components of the Binary Vector include:

- Left and right borders: The binary vector also contains left and right borders (LB and RB), which define the boundaries of the T-DNA region that will be transferred into the plant genome. These border sequences serve as recognition sites for the endonuclease enzymes of Agrobacterium, which nick and cleave the DNA to allow transfer into the plant cell nucleus.
  - Inside the T-DNA region, several functional elements are present. First, it contains the gene of interest which encodes the functional protein that researchers aim to introduce into the plant. Secondly fused to the gene of interest is a reporter gene which enable visualization and quantification of successful gene integration in the plant. The reporter genes used could be E. coli lac Z gene, which produces a blue color upon staining, and GFP (Green Fluorescent Protein), which fluoresces under UV light. A promoter is also introduced which drives the expression of the gene of interest within the plant cells. Commonly used promoters include the CaMV 35S promoter and the UBQ10 promoter for constitutive expression. Finally, a terminator sequence signals the end of transcription, ensuring that the gene is expressed properly and consistently in the plant cell
  - Inside the T-DNA there is also the plant selectable marker. This marker allows for the selection of plants that have successfully integrated the trans-gene and T-DNA into their nuclear genome. When transformed plants are exposed to a marker such as a herbicide (e.g., phosphinothricin) or an antibiotic (e.g., kanamycin), only those that have successfully integrated the transgene and the selectable marker gene will survive and grow. Any cells that have not integrated the transgene will be sensitive to the marker and will not survive under selective conditions.
- Binary vectors also contain elements necessary for bacterial replication and selection outside of the T-DNA region. A bacterial selectable marker allows for the selection of E. coli cells that have successfully taken up the binary plasmid during cloning and amplification. Examples of bacterial selectable markers include genes for antibiotic resistance such as ampicillin (AmpR) and kanamycin (KanR).
- The vector also includes an origin of replication for E. coli, which ensures that the plasmid is recognized by the bacterial replication machinery and replicated each time the E. coli cells divide. Additionally, the binary vector contains an origin of replication for Agrobacterium, which is required to ensure that the plasmid can replicate within Agrobacterium cells. After cloning and amplification in E. coli, the plasmid is transferred into Agrobacterium for plant transformation. The origin of replication for Agrobacterium ensures that the plasmid is maintained and as the Agrobacterium cells divide, making it available for T-DNA transfer during the plant infection process.

The combination of these components makes binary vectors versatile and effective tools for plant genetic engineering, allowing researchers to modify and amplify plasmids efficiently in E. coli before introducing them into Agrobacterium for plant transformations.

Representative series of binary vectors are listed below.

Main series of T-DNA binary vectors
Series	Vector	Year	GenBank accession	Size (bp)	Autonomous replication in Agrobacterium	Reference
pBIN	pBIN19	1984	U09365	11777	Yes	
pPVP	pPZP200	1994	U10460	6741	Yes	
pCB	pCB301	1999	AF139061	3574	Yes	
pCAMBIA	pCAMBIA-1300	2000	AF234296	8958	Yes	
pGreen	pGreen0000	2000	AJ007829	3228	No	
pLSU	pLSU-1	2012	HQ608521	4566	Yes	
pLX	pLX-B2	2017	KY825137	3287	Yes	

=== Vir helper plasmid ===
The vir helper plasmid contains the vir genes that originated from the Ti plasmid of Agrobacterium. These genes code for a series of proteins that cut the binary vector at the left and right border sequences, and facilitate transfer and integration of T-DNA to the plant's cells and genomes, respectively.

Several vir helper plasmids have been reported, and common Agrobacterium strains that include vir helper plasmids are:

- EHA101
- EHA105
- AGL-1
- LBA4404
- GV2260

The original Ti plasmid of Agrobacterium tumefaciens contains both the T-DNA region and the vir genes necessary for T-DNA processing and transfer. The plasmid is large and can often exceed over 200kb in length and is structurally complex, leading to challenges for genetic manipulation and cloning. To overcome these limitations, two plasmids can be used over one: binary vector and a vir helper plasmid.

1) Binary vector plasmid: a small vector that contains the T-DNA border flanking the transgene of interest and selectable marker genes for both plant and bacterial selection.

2) Vir helper plasmid: harbors the full complement of virulence genes but lacks the T-DNA sequence. It provides the necessary machinery to mediate T-DNA excision and transfer. It does not contribute to any foreign DNA to the plant genome.

=== Advantages of using two plasmids ===
1. Modularity: multiple vectors carrying different genes of interest can be introduced into a single vir strain without altering the helper plasmid. It allows researchers to independently design and manipulate the T-DNA region without affecting the virulence machinery [1,4].
  1. Independent Construction: Since the virulence (vir) genes are maintained on a separate plasmid, researchers can freely modify the T-DNA cassette within the binary vector without compromising transformation competency.
  2. Reusability: A single Agrobacterium strain harbouring a stable vir helper plasmid can be used to introduce a wide variety of binary vectors. This eliminates the need to reconstruct the entire plasmid for each new transgene construct.
2. Efficiency: small size vectors can help enhance the transformation efficiency and facilitate the use of cloning strategies.
  1. Smaller Vector Size: The binary vector, typically around 10 to 15 kb in size is significantly smaller than the actual Ti plasmid which is around 200+ kb. Making it much easier to clone and propagate in E. coli and Agrobacterium.
  2. Improved Cloning Fidelity: The reduced complexity of the binary vector lowers the chance of recombination events or plasmid instability during propagation.
  3. Higher Transformation Rates: Binary vectors can be tailored with strong, tissue specific promoters and codon optimized transgenes, leading to high expression and integration efficiency in the target plant tissue.

The adoption of the two-plasmid T-DNA binary system has revolutionized plant genetic engineering by improving flexibility and transformation efficiency. By separating the transgene cassette from the virulence machinery, researchers can conduct precise and genetic modification. These advantages have made the binary system the standard system for Agrobacterium-mediated transformation in both academic and industrial settings.

== Development of T-DNA binary vectors ==
The pBIN19 vector was developed in the 1980s and is one of the first and most widely used binary vectors. The pGreen vector, which was developed in 2000, is a newer version of the binary vector that allows for a choice of promoters, selectable markers and reporter genes. Another distinguishing feature of pGreen is its large reduction in size (from about 11,7kbp to 4,6kbp) from pBIN19, therefore increasing its transformation efficiency.

Along with higher transformation efficiency, pGreen has been engineered to ensure transformation integrity. Both pBIN19 and pGreen usually use the same selectable marker nptII, but pBIN19 has the selectable marker next to the right border, while pGreen has it close to the left border. Due to a polarity difference in the left and right borders, the right border of the T-DNA enters the host plant first. If the selectable marker is near the right border (as is the case with pBIN19) and the transformation process is interrupted, the resulting plant may have expression of a selectable marker but contain no T-DNA giving a false positive. The pGreen vector has the selectable marker entering the host last (due to its location next to the left border) so any expression of the marker will result in full transgene integration.

The pGreen-based vectors are not autonomous and they will not replicate in Agrobacterium if pSoup is not present. Series of small binary vectors that autonomously replicate in E. coli and Agrobacterium include:

- pCB
- pLSU
- pLX

== Applications of the Binary Vector System in Genetic Engineering ==
The T-DNA binary system has been an important instrumental application in plant genetic engineering. Its features of being versatile allows it for efficient delivery of transgenes into diverse plant species. With this concept, there are several key application areas that have benefited the real world.

=== Generation of Transgenic Crop ===
T-DNA binary system was used to develop genetically modified (GM) crops with enhanced traits.

=== Insect resistant maize ===
A binary system has been used to insert Bacillus thuringiensis (Bt) toxin genes into crops, conferring resistance to pests. But toxins, such as Cry1Ac or Cry2Ab, are highly specific to certain insect pests and do not harm humans, beneficial insects, and other non-target organisms.

Bt action and steps:

1. insects eat Bt crystals and spores that are produced by the transgene in the plant genome.
2. Toxin binds to specific receptors in the genome and the insects stop eating.
3. The crystal causes the gut wall to break down, allowing spores and normal gut bacteria to enter the body.
4. the insect dies as spores and get bacteria proliferate in the body

=== Golden Rice ===
T-DNA binary system was used to introduce multiple genes to engineer provitamin A biosynthesis in rice endosperm, addressing vitamin A deficiency in developing countries. Vitamins A deficiency is a major cause of preventable blindness and increases susceptibility to infectious disease as in children. The two genes psy and crtl gene were inserted in the T-DNA region of a binary plasmid in the rice nuclear genome and placed in the control of an endosperm specific promoter, so that they are only expressed in the endosperm to ensure expression in the edible part of the grain. This illustrates the power of the T-DNA binary system in engineering complex metabolic pathways in a tissue specific manner. Using transformation strategies can be harnessed to produce nutritionally enhanced crops with significant public health benefits. The T-DNA binary system has enabled the precise and stable insertion of agriculturally important genes into crop genomes. Through the development of insect-resistant and nutritionally fortified crops, this technology has significantly contributed to sustainable agriculture, food security, and improved public health. The real-world applications underscore the versatility and impact of the binary system as a foundational part form in part genetic engineering.
