= Glufosinate =

Broad-spectrum herbicide

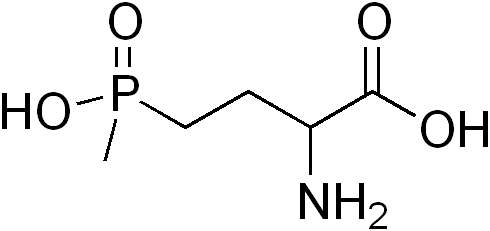

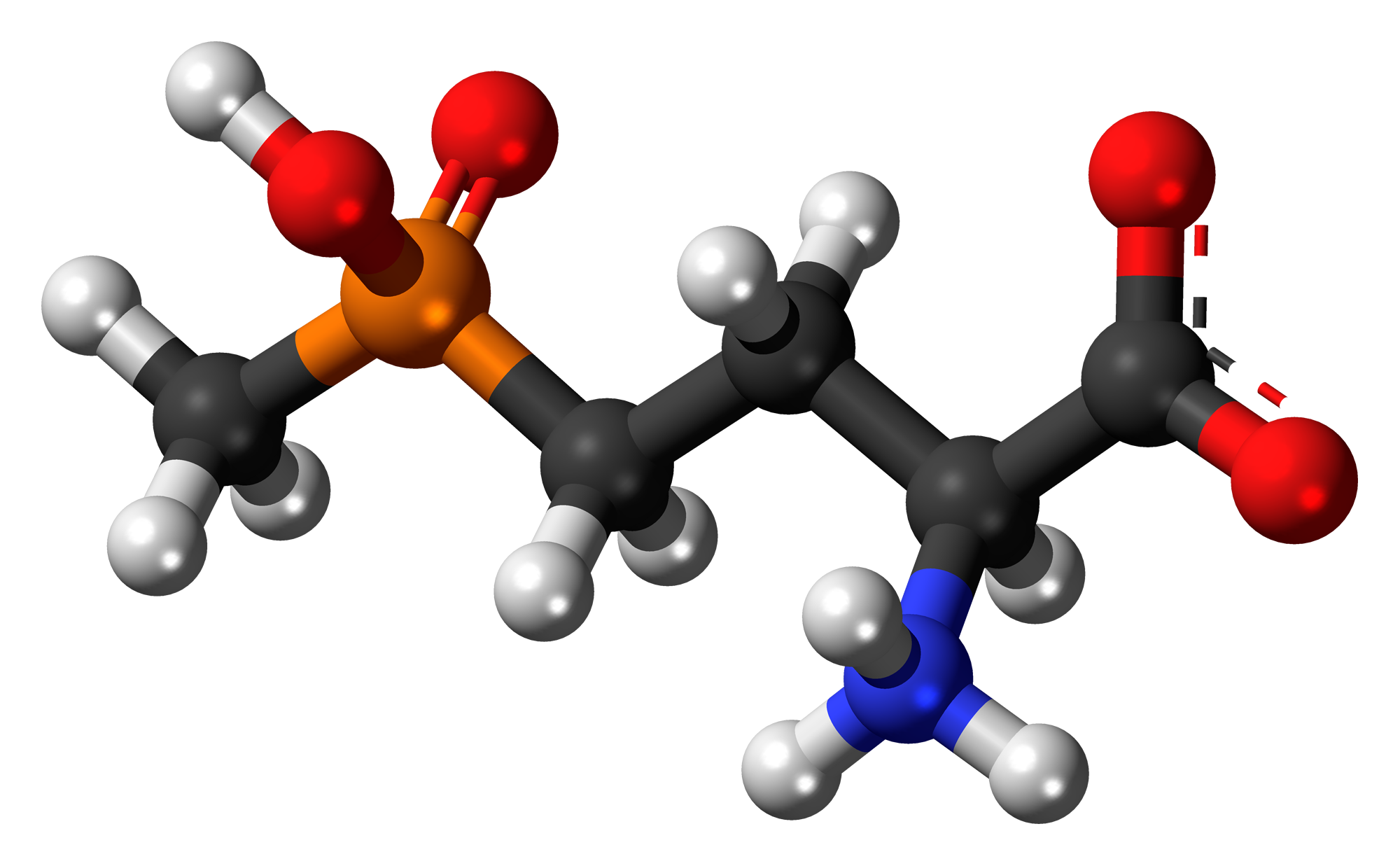

Names
- Preferred IUPAC name 2-Amino-4-[hydroxy(methylphosphonoyl)]butanoic acid
- Other names Phosphinothricin

Identifiers
CAS Number	51276-47-2; 77182-82-2 (monoammonium salt)
3D model (JSmol)	Interactive image
ChEBI	CHEBI:52136
ChEMBL	ChEMBL450298
ChemSpider	4630
ECHA InfoCard	100.051.893
EC Number	257-102-5
KEGG	C05042
PubChem CID	4794
UNII	C8W4FP6BTY
CompTox Dashboard (EPA)	DTXSID0043973
- InChI: InChI=1S/C5H12NO4P/c1-11(9,10)3-2-4(6)5(7)8/h4H,2-3,6H2,1H3,(H,7,8)(H,9,10) Key: IAJOBQBIJHVGMQ-UHFFFAOYSA-N
- SMILES: O=P(O)(CCC(C(=O)O)N)C

Properties
Chemical formula	C_{5}H_{12}NO_{4}P
Molar mass	181.128 g·mol^{−1}

Hazards
- Lethal dose or concentration (LD, LC)
LD_{50} (median dose)	2040 mg/kg (rat, oral); 1400 mg/kg (rat, dermal)
- Except where otherwise noted, data are given for materials in their standard state (at 25 °C [77 °F], 100 kPa). verify (what is ?) Infobox references

Glufosinate (also known as phosphinothricin and often sold as an ammonium salt) is a naturally occurring broad-spectrum herbicide produced by several species of Streptomyces soil bacteria. Glufosinate is a non-selective, contact herbicide, with some systemic action. Plants may also metabolize bialaphos and phosalacine, other naturally occurring herbicides, directly into glufosinate. The compound irreversibly inhibits glutamine synthetase, an enzyme necessary for the production of glutamine and for ammonia detoxification, giving it antibacterial, antifungal, and herbicidal properties. Application of glufosinate to plants leads to reduced glutamine and elevated ammonia levels in tissues, halting photosynthesis and resulting in plant death.

== Discovery ==
In the 1960s and early 1970s, scientists at the University of Tübingen and Meiji Seika Kaisha Company independently discovered that species of Streptomyces bacteria produce a tripeptide they called bialaphos that inhibits bacteria; it consists of two alanine residues and a unique amino acid that is an analog of glutamate that they named "phosphinothricin". They determined that phosphinothricin irreversibly inhibits glutamine synthetase. Phosphinothricin was first synthesized by scientists at Hoechst in the 1970s as a racemic mixture called glufosinate; it is the commercially relevant version of the chemical.

In the late 1980s, scientists discovered enzymes in these Streptomyces species that selectively inactivate free phosphinothricin; the gene encoding the enzyme that was isolated from Streptomyces hygroscopicus was called the "bialaphos resistance" or bar gene, and the gene encoding the enzyme in Streptomyces viridochromogenes was called "phosphinothricin acetyltransferase" or pat. The two genes and their proteins have 80% homology on the DNA level and 86% amino acid homology and are each 158 amino acids long.

== Use ==
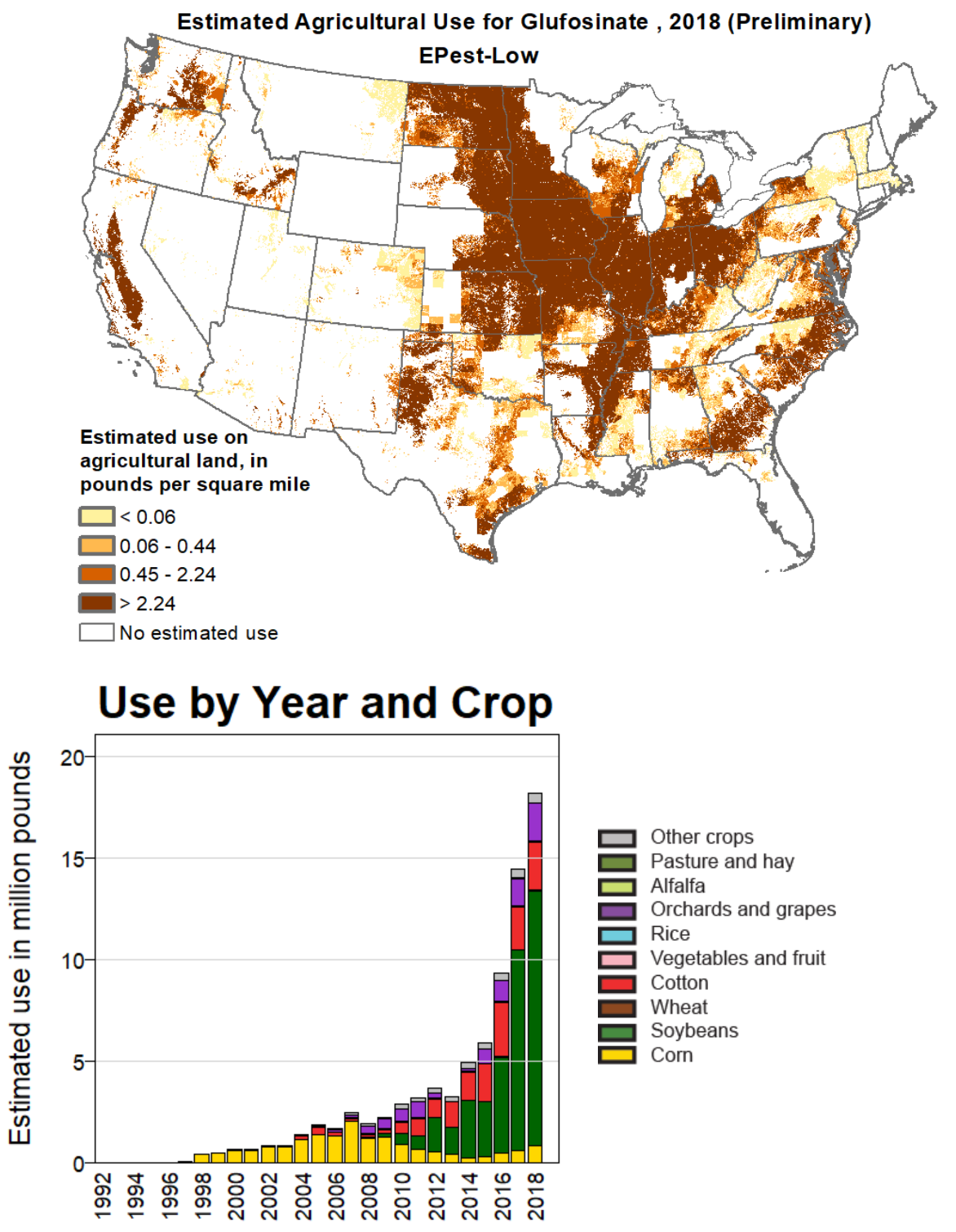
Glufosinate use in the USA in 2018

Glufosinate is a broad-spectrum herbicide that is used to control important weeds such as morning glories, hemp sesbania (Sesbania bispinosa), Pennsylvania smartweed (Polygonum pensylvanicum), and yellow nutsedge (Cyperus esculentus) similar to glyphosate. It is applied to young plants during early development for full effectiveness. It is sold in formulations under brands including Basta, Rely, Finale, Challenge, and Liberty. Glufosinate is typically used as an herbicide as:

- Directed sprays for weed control, including in genetically modified crops
- Crop desiccation to facilitate harvesting

Glufosinate also has shown to provide some protection against various plant diseases, as it also acts to kill fungi and bacteria on contact.

=== Genetically modified crops ===
Genetically modified crops resistant to glufosinate were created by genetically engineering the bar or pat genes from Streptomyces into the relevant crop seeds. In 1995, the first glufosinate-resistant crop, canola, was brought to market, and it was followed by corn in 1997, cotton in 2004, and soybeans in 2011.

== Mode of action ==
Phosphinothricin is a glutamine synthetase inhibitor that binds to the glutamate site. Glufosinate-treated plants die due to a buildup of ammonia in the thylakoid lumen, leading to the uncoupling of photophosphorylation, which causes the production of reactive oxygen species, lipid peroxidation, and membrane destruction.

Elevated levels of ammonia are detectable within one hour after application of phosphinothricin.

== Toxicity ==
=== Exposure to humans in foods ===
As glufosinate is often used as a preharvest desiccant, it can be found in foods that humans ingest. Such foods include potatoes, peas, beans, corn, wheat, and barley. In addition, the chemical can be passed to humans through animals that are fed contaminated straw. Flour processed from wheat grain that contained traces of glufosinate was found to retain 10-100% of the chemical's residues.

The herbicide is also persistent; it has been found to be prevalent in spinach, radishes, wheat, and carrots that were planted 120 days after the treatment of the herbicide. Its persistent nature can also be observed by its half-life, which varies from 3 to 70 days depending on the soil type and organic matter content. Residues can remain in frozen food for up to two years and the chemical is not easily destroyed by cooking the food item in boiling water. The EPA classifies the chemical as persistent and mobile based on its lack of degradation and ease of transport through soil. A study revealed the presence of circulating PAGMF in women with and without pregnancy, paving the way for a new field in reproductive toxicology including nutrition and uteroplacental toxicities

=== Exposure limits ===
No exposure limits have been established by the Occupational Safety and Health Administration or the American Conference of Governmental Industrial Hygienists. The WHO/FAO recommended acceptable daily intake (ADI) for glufosinate is 0.02 mg/kg. The European Food Safety Authority has set an ADI of 0.021 mg/kg. The acute reference dose for child-bearing women is 0.021 mg/kg.

== Regulation ==
Glufosinate is a US EPA-registered chemical. It is also a California registered chemical. It is not banned in the country and it is not a PIC pesticide. No exposure limits have been established by OSHA.

Glufosinate is not approved for use as an herbicide in Europe; it was last reviewed in 2007 and that registration expired in 2018. It has been withdrawn from the French market since October 24, 2017, by the Agence nationale de sécurité sanitaire de l'alimentation, de l'environnement et du travail due to its classification as a possible reprotoxic chemical (R1b).

Glufosinate is registered in Australia and India.

== See also ==
- Bialaphos
- Phosalacine
