= Barstar =

Protein family

Barstar (barnase inhibitor)
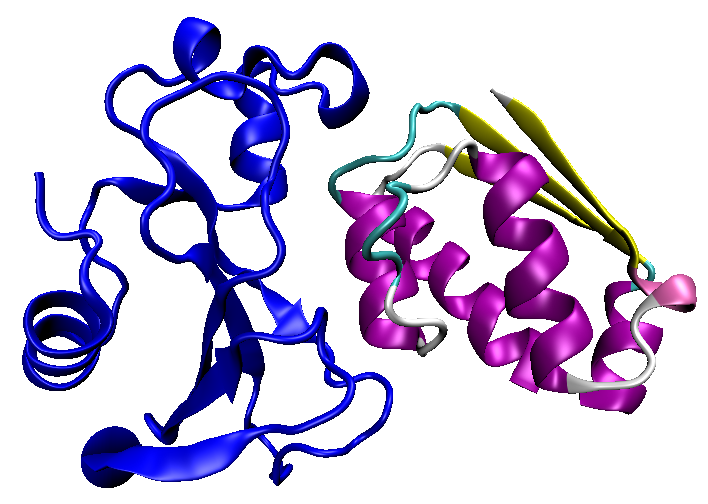
- The tightly bound complex between barstar and barnase, the ribonuclease barstar inhibits. Barstar is colored by secondary structure and barnase is colored in blue.

Identifiers
- Symbol: Barstar
- Pfam: PF01337
- InterPro: IPR000468
- SCOP2: 1brs / SCOPe / SUPFAM
Available protein structures:
- Pfam: structures / ECOD
- PDB: RCSB PDB; PDBe; PDBj
- PDBsum: structure summary
- PDB: 1b2sD:2-89 1bgsG:2-89 1x1wD:2-89 1x1xD:2-89 1brsD:2-89 1b27F:2-89 1bta :2-89 1ab7 :2-89 1b3sE:2-89 1b2uF:2-89 1x1yE:2-89 1x1uE:2-89 1ay7B:2-89 1a19B:2-89 1btb :2-89 1l1kA:2-20

Barstar is a small protein synthesized by the bacterium Bacillus amyloliquefaciens. Its function is to inhibit the ribonuclease activity of its binding partner barnase, with which it forms an extraordinarily tightly bound complex within the cell until barnase is secreted. Expression of barstar is necessary to counter the lethal effect of expressed active barnase. The structure of the barnase-barnstar complex is known.
