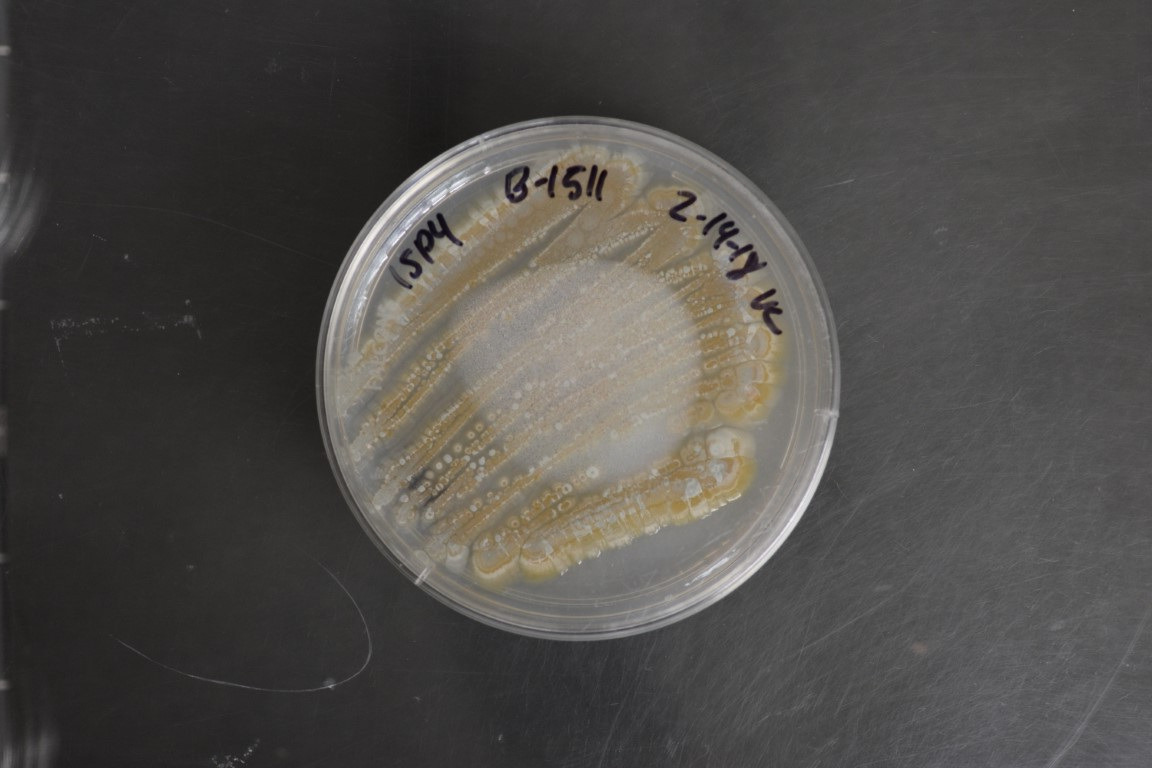

Scientific classification
- Domain: Bacteria
- Kingdom: Bacillati
- Phylum: Actinomycetota
- Class: Actinomycetia
- Order: Streptomycetales
- Family: Streptomycetaceae
- Genus: Streptomyces
- Species: S. viridochromogenes

Binomial name
- Streptomyces viridochromogenes (Krainsky 1914) Waksman and Henrici 1948

Synonyms
- Actinomyces viridochromogenes Krainsky 1914

= Streptomyces viridochromogenes =

Species of bacterium

Streptomyces viridochromogenes is a bacterium species in the genus Streptomyces.

S. viridochromogenes produces the natural herbicide bialaphos and the antibiotics streptazolin and avilamycin.

== See also ==
- List of Streptomyces species
