= CAT RNA-binding domain =

Protein domain

CAT_RBD
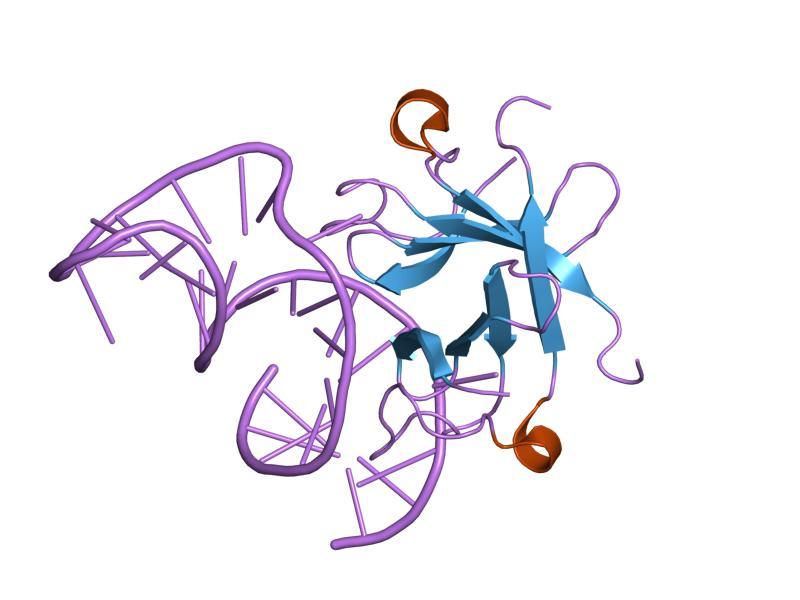
- structure of the lict bacterial antiterminator protein in complex with its rna target

Identifiers
- Symbol: CAT_RBD
- Pfam: PF03123
- InterPro: IPR004341
- SCOP2: 1h99 / SCOPe / SUPFAM
Available protein structures:
- Pfam: structures / ECOD
- PDB: RCSB PDB; PDBe; PDBj
- PDBsum: structure summary

In molecular biology, the CAT RNA-binding domain (Co-AntiTerminator RNA-binding domain) is a protein domain found at the amino terminus of a family of transcriptional antiterminator proteins. This domain forms a dimer in the crystal structure. Transcriptional antiterminators of the BglG/SacY family are regulatory proteins that mediate the induction of sugar metabolizing operons in Gram-positive and Gram-negative bacteria. Upon activation, these proteins bind to specific targets in nascent mRNAs, thereby preventing abortive dissociation of the RNA polymerase from the DNA template.
