= Bglg-cis-reg RNA =

bglG-cis-reg
- Consensus secondary structure and sequence conservation of cis-regulatory element of the bglG/LicT operon

Identifiers
- Symbol: bglG-cis-reg
- Rfam: RF03530

Other data
- RNA type: Cis-reg
- SO: SO:0005836
- PDB structures: PDBe

The bglG cis regulatory RNA was identified by RNA deep sequencing of Clostridioides difficile 630 where it is located immediately upstream of gene bglG2. BglG2 is an antiterminator protein involved in the regulation of genes of the Beta-glucoside phosphotransferase system in. Homologues of the C. difficile element were found across Clostridiales and other Bacillota. The element is consistently located 5' of bglG2 or LicT, another antiterminator of the Beta-Glucoside Phosphotransferase System [2], consistent with a cis-regularly function at these operons. Only Clostridiales sequences were included in the seed alignment. Sequence is named S0591 in ref.
