= Irina Artsimovitch =

Microbiology researcher

Irina Artsimovitch is an American microbiologist. She is a fellow of the American Association for the Advancement of Science, and American Academy of Microbiology.

== Life ==
She graduated from Moscow State University, and University of Tennessee. She is Distinguished Professor at Ohio State University.

She held a seminar about RNA. She studies the RNA Termination signal, and RNA polymerases.

== Works ==
- Artsimovitch, Irina; Landick, Robert (2000-06-20). "Pausing by bacterial RNA polymerase is mediated by mechanistically distinct classes of signals". Proceedings of the National Academy of Sciences. 97 (13): 7090–7095. doi:10.1073/pnas.97.13.7090. ISSN 0027-8424. PMC 16504. PMID 10860976.
- Tabilo‐Agurto, Cyndi; Reyes, Javiera; Artsimovitch, Irina; Ramírez‐Sarmiento, César A. (2025). "Computational and experimental assessment of key interdomain residues controlling the fold‐switch of RfaH". Protein Science. 34 (7). doi:10.1002/pro.70202. ISSN 0961-8368. PMC 12168481. PMID 40522227.
- Wang, Bing; Said, Nelly; Hilal, Tarek; Finazzo, Mark; Wahl, Markus C.; Artsimovitch, Irina (2025-02-15). "Nucleotide-induced hyper-oligomerization inactivates transcription termination factor ρ". Nature Communications. 16 (1). doi:10.1038/s41467-025-56824-8. ISSN 2041-1723. PMC 11829017. PMID 39952913.
