= Sankar Adhya =

Microbiologist

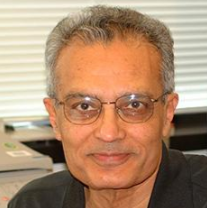
- Born: Kolkata, India
- Education: University of Calcutta; University of Wisconsin-Madison
- Known for: Bacterial transcription; Gene regulation; Bacteriophages
- Scientific career
- Fields: Molecular biology; Genetics; Microbiology
- Institutions: National Institutes of Health

Sankar Adhya (born 4 October 1937) is a molecular biologist and geneticist at the National Cancer Institute (NCI) and a member of the National Academy of Sciences. He is best known for his work on bacterial transcription and the biology of bacteriophage lambda. He has made important contributions regarding the physical basis of transcriptional regulation in bacteria, the lysis/lysogeny switch in lambda phage, the organization of the bacterial nucleoid, and phage therapy.

== Early life and education ==
Adhya was born in Kolkata, India and studied chemistry at the University of Calcutta as an undergraduate. He later obtained a Ph.D. from the University of Calcutta in biochemistry and a second Ph.D. in genetics from the University of Wisconsin–Madison.

== Work ==
Following postdoctoral training at Stanford University, the Bose Institute, and the University of Rochester, he joined the NCI's newly formed Laboratory of Molecular Biology (LMB) in 1971. He has remained at the NIH since 1971 and is presently Head of the LMB's Developmental Genetics section.

== Awards and honors ==
- Elected to the National Academy of Sciences in 1994.
- Elected to the Indian National Science Academy in 1995.
- Elected to the American Academy of Arts and Sciences in 2009.
- Elected to the Hungarian Academy of Sciences in 2010 as a foreign member.

== Selected publications ==
- Adhya, S; Gottesman, M (1978). "Control of transcription termination". Annual Review of Biochemistry. 47 (1): 967–996. doi:10.1146/annurev.bi.47.070178.004535. PMID 354508.
- Irani, M; Orosz, L; Adhya, S (1983). "A control element within a structural gene: the gal operon of Escherichia coli". Cell. 32 (3): 783–788. doi:10.1016/0092-8674(83)90064-8. PMID 6299576. S2CID 41077642.
- Adhya, S (1989). "Multipartite genetic control elements: communication by DNA loop". Annual Review of Genetics. 23 (1): 227–250. doi:10.1146/annurev.ge.23.120189.001303. PMID 2694932.
- Merril, C; Biswas, B; Carlton, R; Jensen, N; Creed, G; Zullo, S; Adhya, S (1996). "Long-circulating bacteriophage as antibacterial agents". Proceedings of the National Academy of Sciences. 93 (8): 3188–3192. Bibcode:1996PNAS...93.3188M. doi:10.1073/pnas.93.8.3188. PMC 39580. PMID 8622911.
- Merril, C; Scholl, D; Adhya, S (2003). "The prospect for bacteriophage therapy in Western medicine". Nature Reviews Drug Discovery. 2 (6): 489–497. doi:10.1038/nrd1111. PMID 12776223. S2CID 23298353.
- Oppenheim, A; Kobiler, O; Stavans, J; Court, D; Adhya, S (2005). "Switches in bacteriophage lambda development". Annual Review of Genetics. 39 (1): 409–429. doi:10.1146/annurev.genet.39.073003.113656. PMID 16285866.
