= Excisionase =

Excisionase-like protein
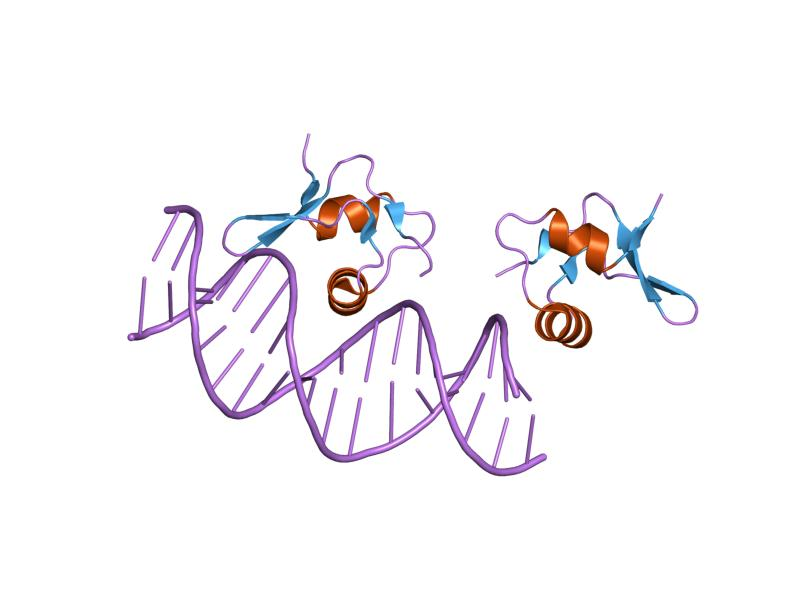
- crystal structure of the lambda xis-dna complex

Identifiers
- Symbol: Exc
- Pfam: PF07825
- Pfam clan: CL0123
- InterPro: IPR012884
Available protein structures:
- PDB: IPR012884 PF07825 (ECOD; PDBsum)
- AlphaFold: IPR012884; PF07825

In molecular biology, excisionase is a bacteriophage protein encoded by the Xis gene. It is involved in excisive recombination by regulating the assembly of the excisive intasome and by inhibiting viral integration. It adopts an unusual winged-helix structure in which two alpha helices are packed against two extended strands. Also present in the structure is a two-stranded anti-parallel beta-sheet, whose strands are connected by a four-residue wing. During interaction with DNA, helix alpha2 is thought to insert into the major groove, while the wing contacts the adjacent minor groove or phosphodiester backbone. The C-terminal region of excisionase is involved in interaction with phage-encoded integrase (Int), and a putative C-terminal alpha helix may fold upon interaction with Int and/or DNA.
