= Antitermination =

Genetic transcription mechanism in prokaryotes

In molecular biology, antitermination is the prokaryotic cell's aid to fix premature termination during the transcription of RNA. It occurs when the RNA polymerase ignores the termination signal and continues elongating its transcript until a second signal is reached. Antitermination provides a mechanism whereby one or more genes at the end of an operon can be switched either on or off, depending on the polymerase either recognizing or not recognizing the termination signal.

Antitermination is used by some phages to regulate progression from one stage of gene expression to the next. The lambda gene N, codes for an antitermination protein (pN) that is necessary to allow RNA polymerase to read through the terminators located at the ends of the immediate early genes. Another antitermination protein, pQ, is required later in phage infection. pN and pQ act on RNA polymerase as it passes specific sites. These sites are located at different relative positions in their respective transcription units.

== Antitermination may be a regulated event ==
Antitermination was discovered in bacteriophage infections. A common feature in the control of phage infection is that very few of the phage genes can be transcribed by the bacterial host RNA polymerase. Among these genes, however, are regulators whose products allow the next set of phage genes to be expressed. One of these types of regulator is an antitermination protein. In the absence of the antitermination protein, RNA polymerase terminates at the terminator. When the antitermination protein is present, it continues past the terminator.

The best characterized example of antitermination is provided by lambda phage, in which the phenomenon was discovered. It is used at two stages of phage expression. The antitermination protein produced at each stage is specific for the particular transcription units that are expressed at that stage.

The host RNA polymerase initially transcribes two genes, which are called the immediate early genes (N and cro). The transition to the next stage of expression is controlled by preventing termination at the ends of the immediate early genes, with the result that the delayed early genes are expressed. The antitermination protein pN acts specifically on the immediate early transcription units. Later during infection, another antitermination protein pQ acts specifically on the late transcription unit, to allow its transcription to continue past a termination sequence.

The different specificities on pN and pQ establish an important general principle: RNA polymerase interacts with transcription units in such a way that an ancillary factor can sponsor antitermination specifically for some transcripts. Termination can be controlled with the same sort of precision as initiation.

The antitermination activity of pN is highly specific, but the antitermination event is not determined by the terminators t_{L1} and t_{R1}; the recognition site needed for antitermination lies upstream in the transcription unit, that is, at a different place from the terminator site at which the action eventually is accomplished.

The recognition sites required for pN action are called nut (for N utilization). The sites responsible for determining leftward and rightward antitermination are described as nut_{L} and nut_{G}, respectively.

When pN recognizes the nut site, it forms a persistent antitermination complex in cooperation with a number of E. coli host proteins. These include three host Nus proteins, NusA, B, and C. NusA is an interesting protein. By itself in E. coli, it is part of the transcription termination system. However, when co-opted by N, it participates in antitermination. The complex must act on RNA polymerase to ensure that the enzyme can no longer respond to the terminator. The variable locations of the nut sites indicate that this event is linked neither to initiation nor to termination, but can occur to RNA polymerase as it elongates the RNA chain past the nut site. Phages that are related to lambda have different N genes and different antitermination specificities. The region on the phage genome in which the nut sites lie has a different sequence in each of these phages, and each phage must therefore have characteristic nut sites recognized specifically by its own pN. Each of these pN products must have the same general ability to interact with the transcription apparatus in an antitermination capacity, but each product also has a different specificity for the sequence of DNA that activates the mechanism.

== Processive antitermination ==
Antitermination in lambda is induced by two quite distinct mechanisms. The first is the result of interaction between lambda N protein and its targets in the early phage transcripts, and the second is the result of an interaction between the lambda Q protein and its target in the late phage promoter. We describe the N mechanism first. Lambda N, a small basic protein of the arginine-rich motif (ARM) family of RNA binding proteins, binds to a 15-nucleotide (nt) stem-loop called BOXB. (We will capitalize the names of sites in RNA and italicize the names of the corresponding DNA sequences; e.g., BOXB and boxB.) boxB is found twice in the lambda chromosome, once in each of the two early operons. It is close to the start point of the P_{L} operon transcript and just downstream of the first translated gene of the P_{R} operon. Neither the distance between the transcription start site and boxB, nor the nature of the promoter (at least in the case of sigma-70-dependent promoters), nor the nature of the terminator is relevant to N action. Although the boxB sequence is not well conserved in other bacteriophages of the lambda family, most of these phages encode proteins that are analogous to lambda N and have sequences capable of forming BOXB-like structures in their P_{L} and P_{R} operons. In some cases, it has been shown that these structures are recognized by the cognate N analogs. It is believed that this accounts for the phage specificity of N-mediated antitermination.

Processive antitermination requires the complete antitermination complex. The assembly of NusB, S10, and NusG onto the core complex involves nt 2 to 7 of lambda BOXA (CGCUCUUACACA), as well as the carboxyl-terminal region of N, which interacts with RNAP. The role of NusG in the N antitermination reaction is not clear. NusG binds to termination factor Rho and to RNAP. It stimulates the rate of transcription elongation and is required for the activity of certain Rho-dependent terminators. NusG is a component of the complete antitermination complex and enhances N antitermination in vitro. However, alteration of lambda BOXA to a variant called BOXA consensus (CGCUCUUUAACA) allows NusB and S10 to assemble in the absence of NusG. Furthermore, depletion of NusG has no effect on lambda N antitermination in vivo, and unlike nusA, nusB, and nusE, no point mutations in nusG that block N activity have been isolated. A NusG homolog, RfaH, enhances elongation of several transcripts in E. coli and S. typhimurium. The possibility that RfaH and NusG are redundant for N antitermination has not yet been tested, although for several other functions, the two proteins are not interchangeable.

Processive antitermination can be mediated by RNA as well as proteins. Coliphage HK022, alone among the known lambdoid phages, does not encode an analog to lambda N. Instead, it promotes antitermination of early phage transcription through the direct action of transcribed sequences called put (for polymerase utilization) sites. There are two closely related put sites, one located in the P_{L} operon and the other located in the P_{R} operon, roughly corresponding to the positions of the nut sequences in lambda and in other lambda relatives. put sites act in cis to promote readthrough of downstream terminators in the absence of all HK022 proteins. The put transcripts are predicted to form two stem-loops separated by a single unpaired nucleotide. This prediction is supported by mutational studies and the pattern of sensitivity of the two RNAs to cleavage with single- and double-strand-specific endoribonucleases. RNA structure is critical to antitermination because mutations that prevent the formation of base pairs in the stems reduce function, and these mutations can be suppressed by additional mutations that restore base pairing. Like lambda N and Q, the PUT sequences suppress polymerase pausing and promote processive antitermination in a purified in vitro transcription system. In contrast to lambda N, no phage or auxiliary bacterial factors are required. The only mutations known to block PUT-mediated antitermination change highly conserved amino acids located in a cysteine-rich amino-proximal domain of the RNAP beta' subunit. Strains carrying these mutations are unable to support lytic growth of HK022 but are normal in all other respects tested, including lytic growth of lambda and other lambda relatives. The phage-restricted phenotypes conferred by these mutations suggest that they alter a domain of RNAP-beta’ that interacts specifically with nascent PUT RNA in the transcription elongation complex, but this idea has not been directly tested. The stability of the putative PUT-RNAP interaction and the nature of the PUT-induced modification to the elongation complex are unknown.

Processive antitermination was first discovered in a bacteriophage, but examples have since been found in bacterial operons. The E. coli rrn operons are regulated by an antitermination mechanism that is dependent on sites that are closely related to lambda boxA and located promoter proximal to the 16S and 23S structural genes in each operon. The sequences of the rrn BOXA sites are more similar to the bacteriophage consensus than is that of lambda, and they bind NusB-S10 more efficiently. Although stem-loop structures analogous to BOXB are found promoter proximal to the BOXA sites, they are not essential for antitermination. An rrn BOXA sequence confers full antitermination activity against Rho-dependent but not against intrinsic terminators. BOXA also increases the rate of transcription elongation by RNAP. Point mutations in BOXA induce premature transcription termination. rrn antitermination requires NusB in vivo, as shown by a NusB depletion experiment. NusA stimulates the elongation rate of rrn RNA chains carrying BOXA. A role for NusA is further suggested by the observation that the nusA10 (Cs) mutation inhibits both antitermination and the rate of transcription elongation in an rrn operon. The role of other Nus factors in rrn regulation in vivo is not clear. In vitro, an antitermination complex that includes NusA, NusB, S10, and NusG forms at the BOXA sequence of rrnG, but these components are not sufficient for antitermination by themselves. An additional factor or factors that can be supplied by a cellular extract are required, but their identities are unknown.
