= HUH-tag =

Generic HUH endonuclease binding to single-stranded DNA.

HUH endonucleases (HUH-tags) are sequence-specific single-stranded DNA (ssDNA) binding proteins originating from numerous species of bacteria and viruses. Viral HUH endonucleases are involved in initiating rolling circle replication while ones of bacterial origin initiate bacterial conjugation. In biotechnology, they can be used to create protein-DNA linkages, akin to other methods such as SNAP-tag. In doing so, they create a 5' covalent bond between the ssDNA and the protein. HUH endonucleases can be fused with other proteins or used as protein tags.

The name HUH stands for "histidine-hydrophobic-histidine," referring to the three amino acids at the active site of the endonuclease. It is common among ssDNA viruses to encode an HUH endonuclease that initiates rolling circle replication of the viral genome.

== Types of HUH endonucleases ==
HUH endonucleases are broadly split into two categories of enzymes: replication initiator proteins (Rep) or relaxase / mobilization proteins. They both contain small protein domains that recognize sequence-specific origins of replication or origin of transfer at which site they nick DNA. The nicking domain of Reps tend to be smaller, on the order of 10-20 kDa while nicking domains from relaxases are larger, roughly 20-40 kDa in size.

== Mode of action ==
HUH endonucleases generally have two histidine (H) residues in the active site coordinating a metal cation (Mg^{2+} or Mn^{2+}) that interacts with the phosphate backbone of DNA. These residues allow for a nucleophilic attack, most commonly by an activated tyrosine of the scissile phosphate in the DNA backbone, generating a 5' covalent bond with the ssDNA. In contrast to other DNA-protein linkage approaches, this reaction occurs at ambient conditions and does not require any additional modifications. X-ray crystallography and NMR structures have provided insight into the sequence specificity of DNA binding.

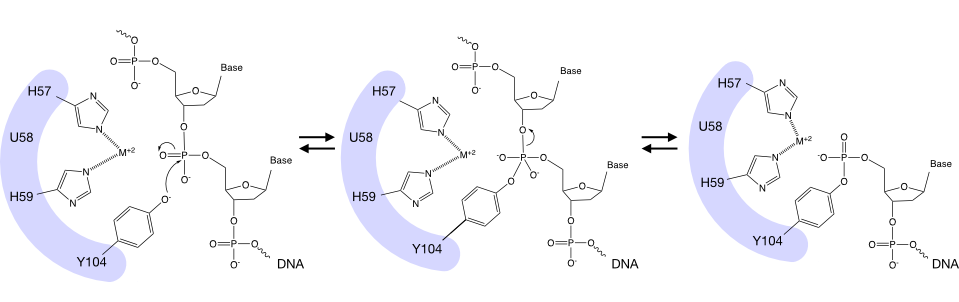
WDV Rep reaction mechanism of nucleophilic attack on the DNA backbone.

== Applications ==
- MobA relaxase incorporated into the viral capsid of Adeno-associated virus to link a DNA-antibody conjugate to target the virus to specific cell types
- PCV2 Rep protein fused to Cas9 to covalently link a DNA repair template to Cas9, resulting in increased homology-directed repair in human cells
- Similar to the approach mentioned above, Agrobacterium VirD2 relaxase fused to Cas9 allowing for linking of a DNA repair template to increase homology-directed repair in plants
- PCV2 Rep protein fused to Elastin-like particles (ELPs) linked to a Mucin-1 DNA aptamer to deliver drugs to cancer cells
- TraI, MobA, and TrwC relaxases used in orthogonal assembly on DNA nanostructures
- PCV2 Rep protein fused to luciferase linked to DNA aptamers that detected thrombin levels in a sample
- "Click editors" - PCV2 Rep protein fused to nCas9 and a DNA polymerase fragment to allow for templated genome editing
