= TraJ-II RNA motif =

traJ-II RNA
- Consensus secondary structure of traJ-II RNAs

Identifiers
- Symbol: traJ-II
- Rfam: RF01760

Other data
- RNA type: Cis-regulatory element
- Domain: Pseudomonadota
- PDB structures: PDBe

The traJ-II RNA motif is a conserved RNA structure discovered in bacteria by using bioinformatics. traJ-II RNAs appear to be in the 5' untranslated regions of protein-coding genes called traJ, which functions in the process of bacterial conjugation. A previously identified motif known as TraJ 5' UTR is also found upstream of traJ genes functions as the target of FinP antisense RNAs, so it is possible that traJ-II RNAs play a similar role as targets of an antisense RNA. However, some sequence features within the traJ-II RNA motif suggest that the biological RNA might be transcribed from the reverse-complement strand. Thus is it unclear whether traJ-II function as cis-regulatory elements. traJ-II RNAs are found in a variety of Pseudomonadota.

It was later observed that traJ-II RNAs location in the genome overlap a previously established oriT (Origin of transfer) plasmid sequence, thus suggesting that the traJ RNA motif might actually function at the DNA level as an oriT, and not function as an RNA.
