= TraA =

The traA gene codes for relaxase, which is an enzyme that initiates plasmid DNA transfer during bacterial conjugation. Relaxase forms a relaxosome complex with auxiliary proteins to initiate conjugation. Relaxosome binds to the origin of transfer (oriT) sequence and cleaves the DNA strand that will be transferred (the T strand).

The TraA gene is usually found on megaplasmids in bacteria, and it is somewhat conserved among different bacterial species. Thirty-one percent and 29 percent of Rhodococcus erthypolis TraA residues are identical to Gordonia westfalica TraA and Arthrobacter aurescens TraA, respectively (Yang et al. 2006).

Among actinomycetales, it is common to find that the traA gene codes for both relaxase and helicase.
