= Traw =

Traw may refer to:

- London Lewis Traw, United States Marine Corps sergeant killed in action during World War II
- USS Traw (DE-350), United States Navy destroyer escort named for Traw
- traW, one kind of protein encoded by transfer genes
- Dialect of the Cua language (Mon-Khmer)
