= Relaxosome =

The relaxosome is the complex of proteins that facilitates plasmid transfer during bacterial conjugation. The proteins are encoded by the tra operon on a fertility plasmid in the region near the origin of transfer, oriT. The most important of these proteins is relaxase, which is responsible for beginning the conjugation process by cutting at the nic site via transesterification. This nicking results in a DNA-Protein complex with the relaxosome bound to a single strand of the plasmid DNA and an exposed 3' hydroxyl group. Relaxase also unwinds the plasmid being conjugated with its helicase properties. The relaxosome interacts with integration host factors within the oriT.

Other genes that code for relaxosome components include TraH, which stabilizes the relaxosome's structural formation, TraI, which encodes for the relaxase protein, TraJ, which recruits the complex to the oriT site, TraK, which increases the 'nicked' state of the target plasmid, and TraY, which imparts single-stranded DNA character on the oriT site. TraM plays a particularly important role in relaxase interaction by stimulating 'relaxed' DNA formation.
