= Zygotic induction =

Biological phenomenon

Zygotic induction occurs when a bacterial cell carrying the silenced DNA of a bacterial virus in its chromosome transfers the viral DNA along with its own DNA to another bacterial cell lacking the virus, causing the recipient of the DNA to break open. In the donor cell, a repressor protein encoded by the prophage (viral DNA) keeps the viral genes turned off so that virus is not produced. When DNA is transferred to the recipient cell by conjugation, the viral genes in the transferred DNA are immediately turned on because the recipient cell lacks the repressor. As a result, many virus are made in the recipient cell, and lysis eventually occurs to release the new virus.

Zygotic induction was discovered by Élie Wollman and François Jacob in 1954. Historically, zygotic induction provided insight into the nature of bacterial conjugation. It also contributed to the development of the early repression model of gene regulation that explained how the lac operon and λ bacteriophage genes are negatively regulated.

== Nature of bacterial conjugation ==
In 1947, Joshua Lederberg and Edward Tatum discovered that nutritional mutants of the bacterium E. coli, when incubated in mixed cultures, exchanged genetic markers to generate new recombinants, although the mating efficiency was inefficient. Later experiments with E. coli strains that mated at a high frequency, which were called Hfr (high frequency of recombinants), revealed how genetic markers were transferred.

Élie Wollman and François Jacob showed that genes were transferred in a certain order from the Hfr donor cell to the F^{−} recipient cell during mating. The longer that the Hfr and F^{−} cells were in contact, the more genes that were transferred. They did not believe that the entire donor chromosome was typically transferred to the recipient. On the other hand, Lederberg had an alternative explanation for the apparent ordered transfer of part of the chromosome. In analogy with fertilization and meiosis of higher organisms, he proposed that all of the genetic material was transferred but that breakage of the donor chromosome occurred at specific locations so that segments of the donor chromosome could be deleted.

Zygotic induction was discovered while the location of prophage λ was being mapped using Hfr x F^{−} matings. When the F^{−} was lysogenic for λ, lysogeny was mapped to the gal locus. However, when the Hfr parent was lysogenic, lysogeny (i.e., the prophage) was not inherited by any of recombinants, which were recovered by growing them as colonies on the appropriate agar medium. The reason is that transfer of the λ prophage into the F^{−} recipient was accompanied by immediate induction of bacteriophage production within the F^{−} cell. Subsequent lysis of this "zygote" released the new bacteriophage particles. If mating terminated before the prophage was transferred, phage was not produced, and recombination proceeded in the zygote. These observations provided evidence that genetic markers was transferred in one direction during conjugation, from the Hfr to F^{−} cell. These experiments also showed that Lederberg's model was incorrect since zygotic induction would have prevented any recombinant from forming had all of the chromosome from the Hfr cell were to be transferred to the F^{−} cell.
