= RK2 plasmid =

Genetic material

The RK2 Plasmid is a broad-host-range plasmid belonging to the incP incompatibility group It is notable for its ability to replicate in a wide variety of single-celled organisms, which makes it suitable as a genetic engineering tool. It is capable of transfer, replication, and maintenance in most genera of Gram-negative bacteria. RK2 may sometimes be referred to as pRK2, which is also the name of another, unrelated plasmid. Other names for RK2 include R18, R68, RP1, and RP4. These were all separate isolates, and later found to be identical plasmids. The IncP-1 plasmid group (IncP plasmids in Escherichia coli) of which RK2 is a part has been described as "highly potent, self-transmissible, selfish DNA molecules with a complicated regulatory circuit"

== Discovery ==
RK2 was first isolated in connection with an outbreak of antibiotic-resistant Pseudomonas aeruginosa and Klebsiella aerogenes in Birmingham in 1969, as one of a family of plasmids implicated in transfer of ampicillin resistance between bacterial strains. Plasmids in the IncP-1 subgroup has been isolated from wastewater, agricultural soil, and hospitals.

== Structure ==
RK2 is approximately 60 kbp long and contains genes for replication, maintenance, conjugation and antibiotic resistance. The resistance genes confer resistance to the antibiotics kanamycin, ampicillin and tetracycline. In addition, RK2 contains a set of potentially lethal (to the cell) genes, called kil genes, and a set of complementary transcriptional repressor genes, called kor (short for "kil-override") genes, which inactivate the kil genes. The kil and kor genes together are suspected to play a role in the broad host range of RK2.

== Replication ==
The essential replication system in RK2 consists of an origin of replication, oriV, and a gene, trfA, whose gene product, the TrfA protein, binds to and activates oriV. In Escherichia coli, replication proceeds unidirectionally from oriV after activation by TrfA. In E. coli, multiple plasmid copies appear to cluster together, creating a few multiplasmid clusters in each cell. The copy number of RK2 is about 4-7 per cell in E. coli and 3 in P. aeruginosa.

== Minimal derivatives ==
Several minimal derivatives of RK2 have been prepared. In these plasmids most of the genes have been removed, leaving only genes essential for replication and one or more selectable markers. One such "mini-replicon" is the plasmid PFF1, which is 5873 basepairs long.

PFF1 consists of an origin of replication, oriV, an origin of transfer, oriT, a gene coding for plasmid replication proteins, trfA, and two antibiotic resistance genes, bla and cat, which confer resistance to ampicillin and chloramphenicol, respectively. Minimal plasmids such as PFF1 are useful for studying the basic mechanisms of plasmid replication and copy number regulation, as there are less superfluous genetic elements which might affect the processes being studied. Several mutants of PFF1 which affect the copy number of the plasmid have been identified. Two such mutants, PFF1cop254D and PFF1cop271C, increase the copy number of PFF1 in E. coli from approximately 39-40 to about 501 and 113 plasmids per cell, respectively. An increase in copy number is useful for genetic engineering applications to increase the production yield of recombinant protein.
