= Triparental mating =

Form of bacterial conjugation

Triparental mating is a form of bacterial conjugation where a conjugative plasmid present in one bacterial strain assists the transfer of a mobilizable plasmid present in a second bacterial strain into a third bacterial strain. Plasmids are introduced into bacteria for such purposes as transformation, cloning, or transposon mutagenesis. Triparental matings can help overcome some of the barriers to efficient plasmid mobilization. For instance, if the conjugative plasmid and the mobilizable plasmid are members of the same incompatibility group they do not need to stably coexist in the second bacterial strain for the mobilizable plasmid to be transferred.

== History ==
Triparental mating was identified in yeasts in 1960 and then in Escherichia coli in 1962.

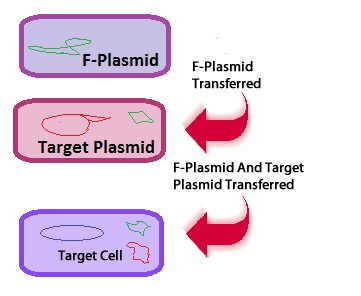
The information being transferred in conjugation

== Process ==
=== Requirements ===
- A helper strain, carrying a conjugative plasmid (such as the F-plasmid) that codes for genes required for conjugation and DNA transfer.
- A donor strain, carrying a mobilizable plasmid that can utilize the transfer functions of the conjugative plasmid.
- A recipient strain, you wish to introduce the mobilizable plasmid into.

Five to seven days are required to determine if the plasmid was successfully introduced into the new bacterial strain and confirm that there is no carryover of the helper or donor strain.

In contrast, electroporation does not require a helper or donor strain. This helps avoid possible contamination with other strains. The introduction of the plasmid can be verified in the recipient strain in two days, making electroporation a faster and more efficient method of transformation. Electroporation however does not work with all bacteria and is mostly limited to well-characterized model organisms.

== See also ==
- Bacterial conjugation
- Plasmid
- Transposon (applications)
- Bacteriophage
- Three-parent baby
