= FinP =

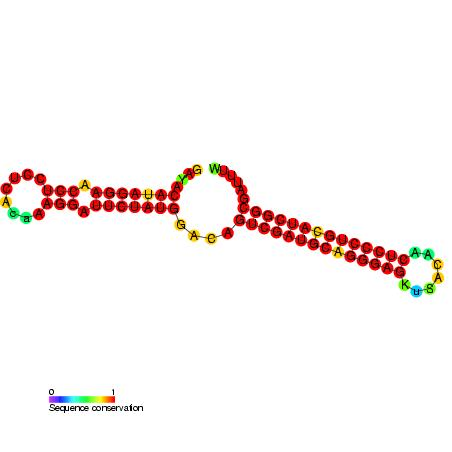
- Predicted secondary structure and sequence conservation of FinP

Identifiers
- Symbol: FinP
- Rfam: RF00107

Other data
- RNA type: Gene
- Domain(s): Bacteria
- SO: SO:0000644
- PDB structures: PDBe

FinP encodes an antisense non-coding RNA gene that is complementary to part of the TraJ 5' UTR. The FinOP system regulates the transfer of F-like plasmids. The traJ gene encodes a protein required for transcription from the major transfer promoter, pY. The FinO protein is essential for effective repression, acting by binding to FinP and protecting it from RNase E degradation.
