= Origin of transfer =

Sequence of DNA

An origin of transfer (oriT) is a short sequence ranging from 40-500 base pairs in length that is necessary for the transfer of DNA from a gram-negative bacterial donor to recipient during bacterial conjugation. The transfer of DNA is a critical component for antimicrobial resistance within bacterial cells and the oriT structure and mechanism within plasmid DNA is complementary to its function in bacterial conjugation. The first oriT to be identified and cloned was on the RK2 (IncP) conjugative plasmid, which was done by Guiney and Helinski in 1979.

== Structure ==
oriT regions are central to the process of transferring DNA from the donor to recipient and contain several important regions that facilitate this:

1. nic site: where the unwound plasmid DNA is cut; usually site-specific.
2. An inverted repeat sequence: signals the end of replication of donor DNA and is responsible for transfer frequency, plasmid mobilization, and secondary DNA structure formation.
3. AT-rich region: important for DNA strand opening and is located adjacent to the inverted repeat sequences.

The oriT is a noncoding region of the bacterial DNA. Due to its important role in initiating bacterial conjugation, the oriT is both an enzymatic substrate and recognition site for the relaxase proteins. Relaxosomes have oriT-specific auxiliary factors that help it to identify and bind to the oriT. Upstream of the oriT nic site is a termination sequence.

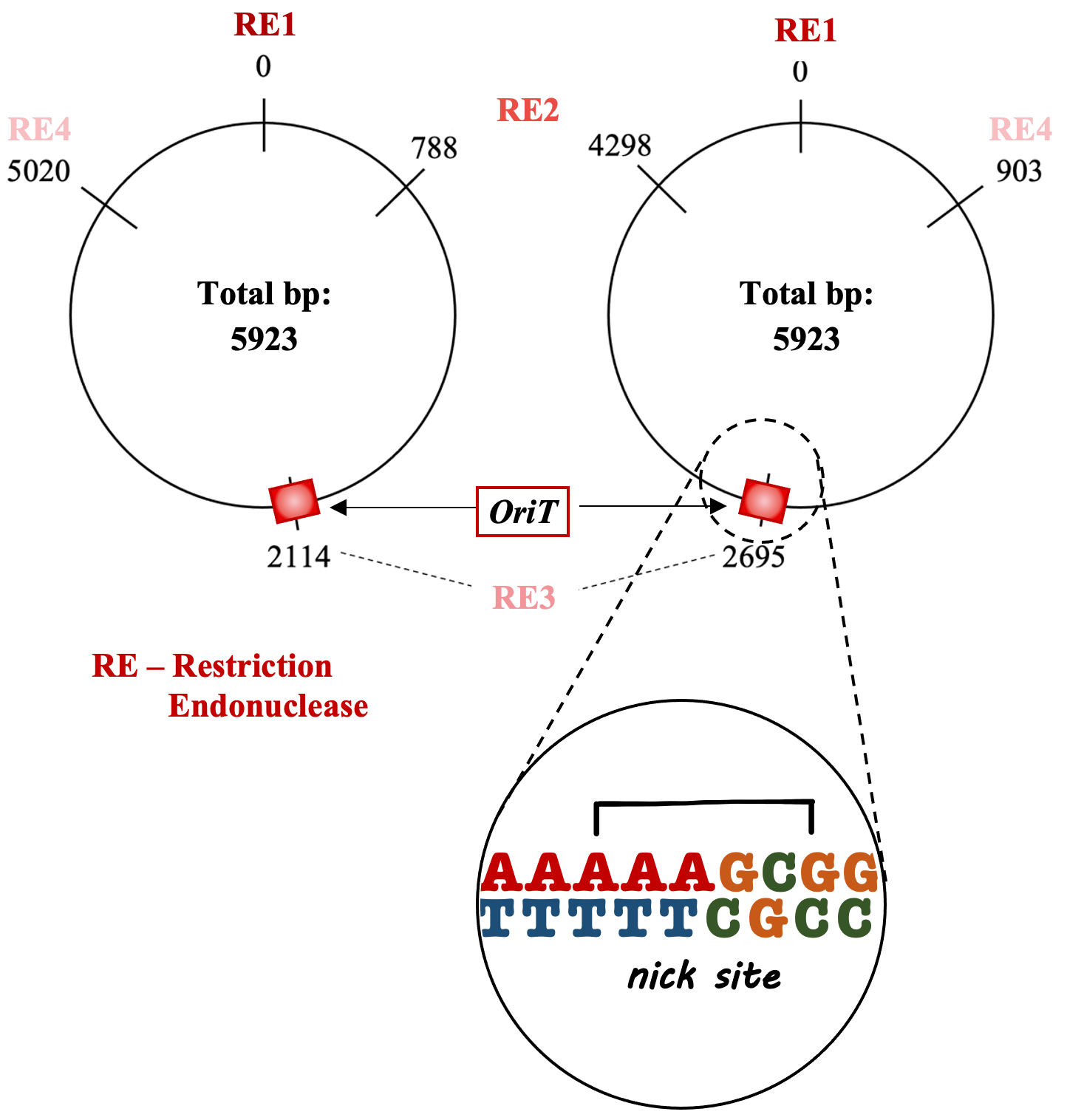
Figure 1 ▲ Region of oriT sequence on plasmid DNA.

oriTs are primarily cis-acting, which allows for a more efficient DNA transfer.

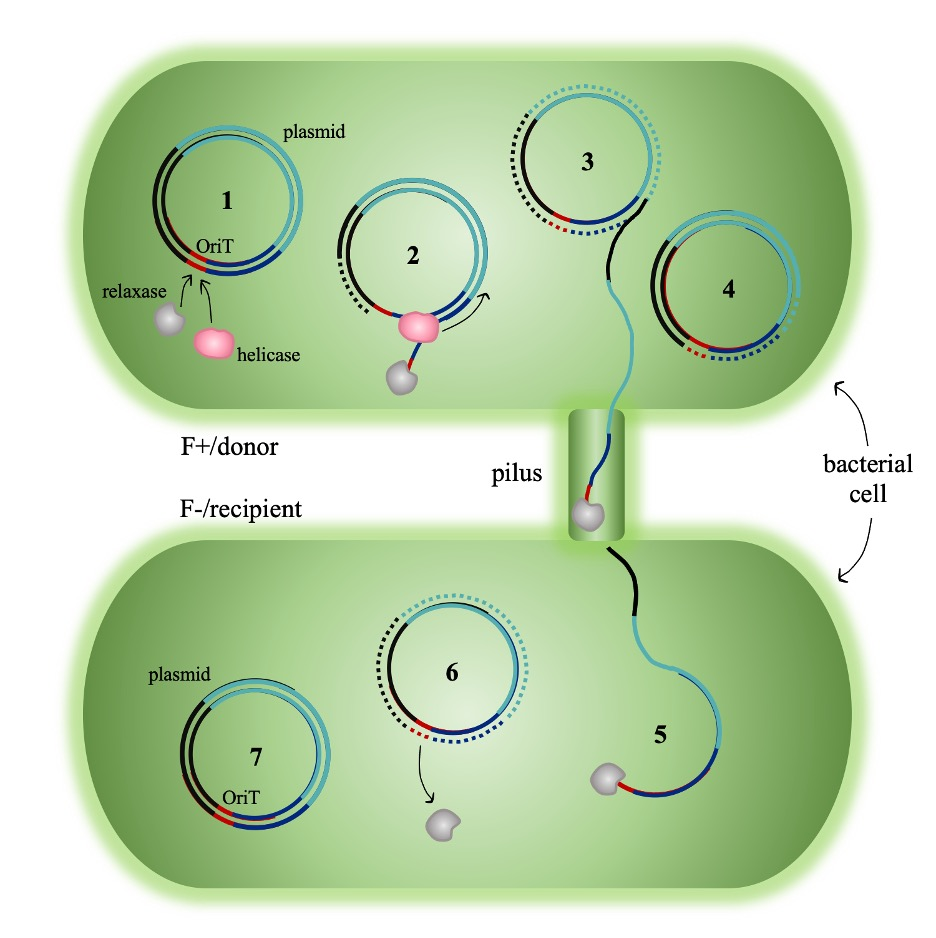
Figure 2 ▲ Two bacterial cells undergoing bacterial conjugation. (1) relaxase and helicase bind to the plasmid (F-factor) at the origin of transfer (OriT). Helicase unwinds the plasmid DNA and relaxase attaches to the transfer DNA strand. (3) Relaxase carries the transfer DNA strand through the pilus connecting the two bacterial cells. (4) The remaining strand is rewound with a complementary strand of DNA. (5) Relaxase joins the two ends of the transfer DNA into a circular plasmid. (6) Relaxase detaches from the plasmid. (7) New plasmid DNA is rewound with a complementary strand of DNA.

== Mechanism and function in bacterial conjugation ==
At the start of bacterial conjugation, a donor cell will elaborate a pilus and signal to a nearby recipient cell to get in close contact. This identification of a suitable recipient cell will begin the mating pair formation process. This process of bringing the two cells together recruits the type IV secretion system, a protein complex that forms the transfer channel between the donor and recipient, starting the formation of the relaxation complex known as the relaxosome at the oriT.

A plasmid's oriT sequence serves as both a recognition point and a substrate for the enzymes in the relaxosome, therefore the first step of bacterial conjugation occurs at the nicn site of the oriT region of the plasmid. Relaxase enzymes, otherwise known as DNA strand transferases part of the relaxosome complex, catalyze a strand- and site-specific phosphodiester bond cleavage at the nicn site and are specific to each plasmid. This reaction is a trans-esterification, which produces a nicked double-stranded DNA with the 5' end bound to a tyrosine residue in the relaxase. The relaxase then moves toward the 3' end of the strand to unwind the DNA in the plasmid.

The other strand of the plasmid, the strand that was not nicked by the relaxase, is a template for further synthesis by DNA polymerase.

Once the relaxase reaches the upstream section of the oriT again where there is an inverted repeat, the process is terminated by reuniting the ends of the plasmid and releasing a single-stranded plasmid in the recipient.

== Applications ==
=== Genetic engineering ===
Conjugation allows for the transfer of target genes to many recipients, including yeast, mammalian cells, and diatoms.

Diatoms could be useful plasmid hosts as they have the potential to autotrophically produce biofuels and other chemicals. There are some methods for genetic transfer for diatoms, but they are slow compared to bacterial conjugation. By designing plasmids for the diatoms P. tricornutum and T. pseudonana based on sequences for yeast and developing a method for conjugation from E. coli to the diatoms, researchers hope to advance genetic manipulation in diatoms.

One of the main problems in using bacterial conjugation in genetic engineering is that certain selectable markers on the plasmids generate bacteria that have resistance to antibiotics like ampicillin and kanamycin.

=== Antimicrobial resistance ===
The interaction between the DNA oriT and relaxase enables antimicrobial resistance via horizontal gene transfer (Figure 1). Various oriT regions in plasmid DNA contain inverted repeats onto which relaxase proteins are able bind. Major contributors of drug resistance are mobile genomic islands (MGIs), or segments in DNA that are found in similar strains of bacteria and are factors in diversification of bacteria. MGIs provide resistance to their host cells, and through bacterial conjugation, spread this advantage to other cells. With bacterial cell MGIs having their own oriT sequences and being in close proximity to relaxosome genes, they are very similar to conjugative plasmids that are responsible for the prevalence of drug resistance among bacterial cells. A 2017 study on MGIs revealed that they are able to integrate themselves into the genome of the receiving bacterial cells by themselves via int, a gene that codes for the integrase enzyme. After the oriT of the MGI are processed by the relaxosomes encoded by integrative and conjugative elements (ICE), the MGI are able to enter the genome of the receiver cells and allow for the multiformity of bacteria that leads to antimicrobial resistance.

== See also ==
- Bacterial conjugation
- Origin of replication
- Recombinant DNA
- Horizontal gene transfer
