= TraJ 5' UTR =

traJ 5' UTR
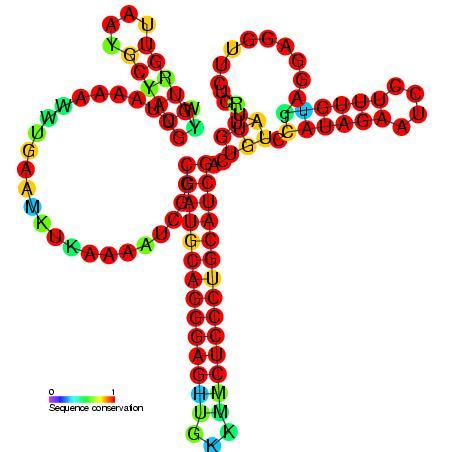
- Predicted secondary structure and sequence conservation of traJ_5

Identifiers
- Symbol: traJ_5
- Rfam: RF00243

Other data
- RNA type: Cis-reg
- Domain(s): Bacteria
- SO: SO:0000204
- PDB structures: PDBe

The traJ 5' UTR is a cis acting RNA element which is involved in regulating plasmid transfer in bacteria.

In conjugating bacteria the FinOP system regulates the transfer of F-like plasmids. The FinP gene encodes an antisense RNA product that is complementary to part of the 5' UTR of the traJ mRNA. The traJ gene encodes a protein required for transcription from the major transfer promoter, pY. The FinO protein is essential for effective repression, acting by binding to FinP and protecting it from RNase E degradation.
