= USS Traw =

John C. Butler class destroyer

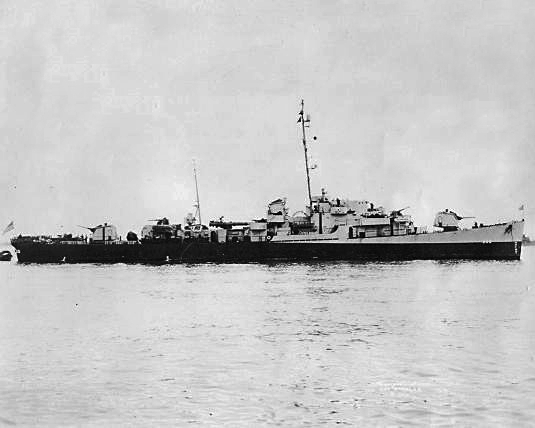
- USS Traw (DE-350) c. 1945

History

United States
- Name: Traw
- Namesake: London Lewis Traw
- Builder: Consolidated Steel Corporation, Orange, Texas
- Laid down: 19 December 1943
- Launched: 12 February 1944
- Commissioned: 20 June 1944
- Decommissioned: 7 June 1946
- Stricken: 1 August 1967
- Fate: Sunk as target off California 17 August 1968

General characteristics
- Class & type: John C. Butler-class destroyer escort
- Displacement: 1,350 long tons (1,372 t)
- Length: 306 ft (93 m)
- Beam: 36 ft 8 in (11.18 m)
- Draft: 9 ft 5 in (2.87 m)
- Propulsion: 2 boilers, 2 geared turbine engines, 12,000 shp (8,900 kW); 2 propellers
- Speed: 24 knots (44 km/h; 28 mph)
- Range: 6,000 nmi (11,000 km; 6,900 mi) at 12 kn (22 km/h; 14 mph)
- Complement: 14 officers, 201 enlisted
- Armament: 2 × single 5 in (127 mm) guns; 2 × twin 40 mm (1.6 in) AA guns; 10 × single 20 mm (0.79 in) AA guns; 1 × triple 21 in (533 mm) torpedo tubes; 8 × depth charge throwers; 1 × Hedgehog ASW mortar; 2 × depth charge racks

USS Traw (DE-350) was a John C. Butler-class destroyer escort in service with the United States Navy from 1944 to 1946. She was sunk as a target in 1968.

== Namesake ==
London Lewis Traw was born on 1 April 1903 in Pocahontas, Arkansas. He enlisted in the United States Marine Corps on 15 December 1924 and, in the course of a career which spanned 18 years, achieved the rank of platoon sergeant. He served with the Marine Detachment on board USS Oklahoma for his first term of service before going into the Reserves in 1928. Returning to active duty in late 1931, Private First Class Traw served in China from August 1936 until February 1938, during which time he was promoted to Corporal and then Platoon sergeant. Following a posting to Guantánamo Bay between December 1940 and April 1941, Platoon sergeant Traw deployed with the First Marine Division for service in the Pacific in early 1942.

Following the 7 August 1942 landing on Guadalcanal, Sgt. Traw participated in the bitter fighting around Lunga Point in the months following. On 24/5 October, a Japanese detachment attacked "Bloody Ridge" on the southern perimeter of Henderson airfield. During the battle, he was wounded in action. Rather than slowing his men down in the fight, he commanded them to tie him to a tree with his rifle near the place where the Japanese were expect to approach from, his men did as he commanded. After the battle his men found Traw dead with his rifle in hand, but around him lay over 600 dead Japanese. He was posthumously awarded the Silver Star.

== History ==
The destroyer escort's keel was laid down on 19 December 1943 at Orange, Texas, by the Consolidated Steel Corp. The ship was launched on 12 February 1944; sponsored by Mrs. Jennie Traw, mother of Sgt. Traw. Traw was commissioned on 20 June 1944.

=== North Atlantic operations ===
For a week after her commissioning, Traw conducted preliminary tests and exercises. Then, on 28 June 1944, she departed Orange, Texas, and arrived at Galveston, Texas, for drydocking. On 7 July, the new destroyer escort got underway in company with sister ships Leland E. Thomas and Jesse Rutherford for her shakedown cruise to Bermuda. Exercises out of Great Sound occupied the remainder of the month as Traw's crew drilled and brought the new ship to battle-readiness.

Following repairs and trials at the Boston Navy Yard, the destroyer escort steamed independently to Norfolk, Virginia, arriving on 28 August 1944. On 30 August, the destroyer escort began a period of activity as a training ship. Daylong cruises to the Chesapeake Bay, with a balance crew on board for training, occupied Traw until late in September. On 24 September, she departed Norfolk escorting the escort carrier Solomons and entered the swept channel at New York City early the next day.

=== North Atlantic convoy operations ===
Operating as a unit of Escort Division 78, Traw got underway on 6 October 1944 in Convoy UGF-15 bound for the Mediterranean. The destroyer escort entered the swept channel at Gibraltar on 17 October and, on 20 October, anchored in the harbor at Marseille. After escorting a small convoy to North Africa, Traw departed Oran on 26 October with a convoy steaming westward for the United States. Late in the day on 16 November, she left the convoy protecting Solomons. As the severe weather of the crossing moderated, Traw delivered her charge safely to Narragansett Bay. She then continued southward, discharged ammunition at the Ammunition Depot, Earle, New Jersey, and reported to the New York Navy Yard for overhaul. Her repairs completed, Traw rendezvoused with the destroyer Cowie and submarine Barracuda on 19 November in Block Island Sound for antisubmarine exercises. In company with other destroyer escorts, she continued exercises until halted by severe weather on 21 November.

She returned to New York and, on 25 November, was again underway escorting Convoy UGF-17 B. On 5 December, Traw left her picket station to pick up official mail at Rosia Bay. Three days later, she acted as navigational guide when the convoy entered the channel at Marseille. After escorting a seven-ship convoy to Oran, she departed Mers el-Kebir on 13 December as a convoy escort. The voyage was uneventful, and she arrived at New York on 23 December.

=== Transfer to the Pacific Fleet ===
Traw completed overhaul at New York; then set her course for Norfolk, arriving on 10 January to prepare for the long voyage to the Pacific. On 19 January, she got underway for the Panama Canal Zone. She entered the Pacific on 25 January; and, three days later, she moored at Seymour Island in the Galapagos for fueling. Assigned to Escort Division 78, U.S. Pacific Fleet, she steamed independently on 1 February, via Bora Bora, for the Admiralties. On 22 February, she passed through the antisubmarine nets and anchored in Seeadler Harbor.

After fueling and upkeep, she joined other destroyer escorts in exercises. Then, on 27 February, she began the escort duties which she would continue until the end of the war. Throughout March and April, Traw protected convoys moving between New Guinea and the Philippines. In May, she made a single voyage to the Palaus; then returned to Leyte where she conducted patrols. She remained in Philippine waters into June, varying convoy and patrol duties with antisubmarine warfare exercises. In July and August, she escorted convoys to Ulithi and Okinawa and returned to the Philippines where she continued her escort duties into September.

=== Post-war activity ===
Late in November she steamed, via Samar and the Marshalls, to Hawaii, arriving there in early before sailing for the U.S. West Coast and arriving at San Pedro, Los Angeles, on 16 December. She moved to San Diego in April 1946 before shifting to Long Beach, California, until her decommissioning at San Diego on 7 June 1946.

The warship remained in reserve for the next twenty years before her name was struck from the Navy List on 1 August 1967. Prepared for use in Operation StrikEx 3-68, her hulk was sunk as a target by gunfire from the destroyer Bausell off Baja California, Mexico, on 17 August 1968.
