= Hfr cell =

Type of bacterium

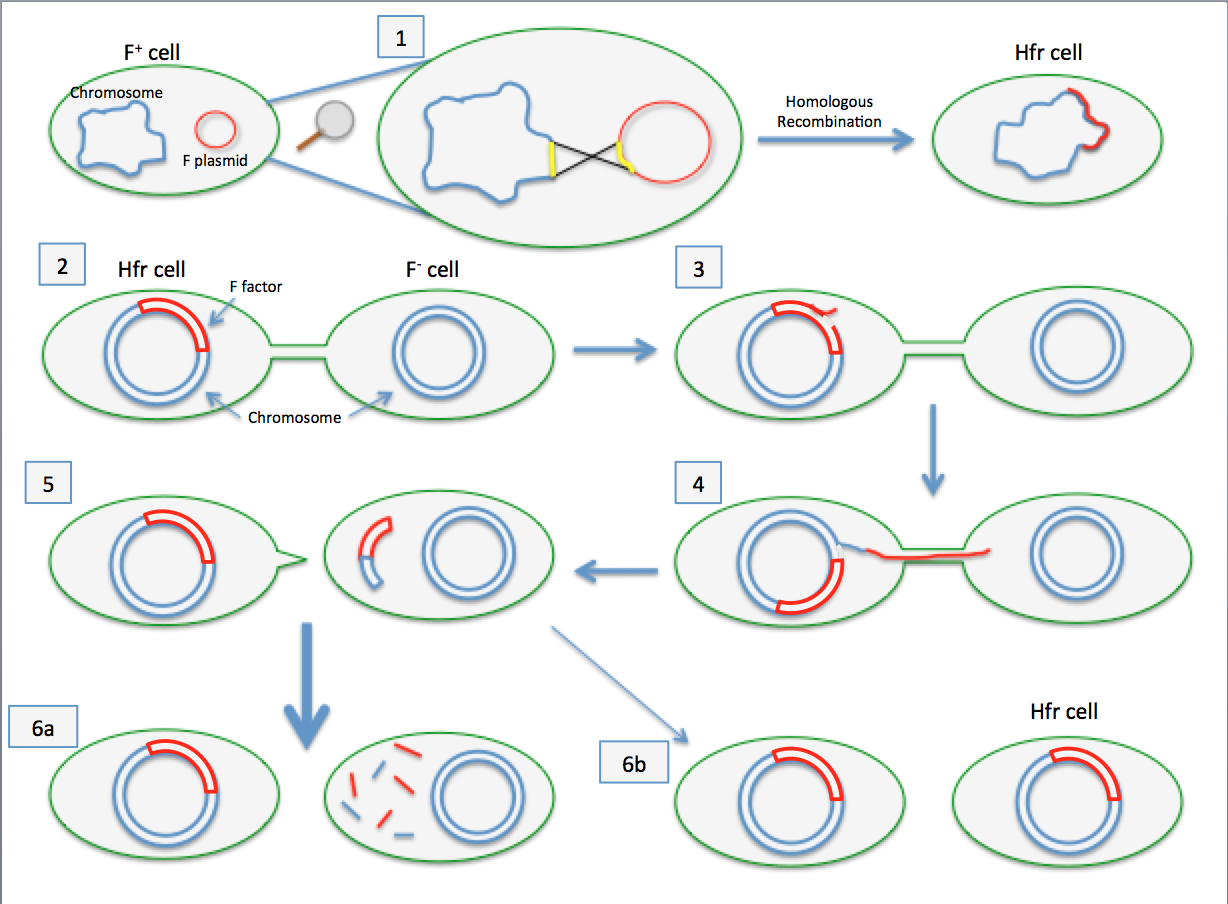
1.The insertion sequences (yellow) on both the F factor plasmid and the chromosome have similar sequences, allowing the F factor to insert itself into the genome of the cell. This is called homologous recombination and creates an Hfr (high frequency of recombination) cell. 2.The Hfr cell forms sex pili a pilus and attaches to a recipient F- cell. 3.A nick in one strand of the Hfr cell’s chromosome is created. 4.DNA begins to be transferred from the Hfr cell to the recipient cell while the second strand of its chromosome is being replicated. 5.The pilus detaches from the recipient cell and retracts. The Hfr cell ideally wants to transfer its entire genome to the recipient cell. However, due to its large size and inability to keep in contact with the recipient cell, it is not able to do so. 6.The F- cell remains F- because the entire F factor sequence was not received. Since no homologous recombination occurred, the DNA that was transferred is degraded by enzymes. In very rare cases, the F factor will be completely transferred and the F- cell will become an Hfr cell.

A high-frequency recombination cell (Hfr cell) (also called an Hfr strain) is a bacterium with a conjugative plasmid (for example, the F-factor) integrated into its chromosomal DNA. The integration of the plasmid into the cell's chromosome is through homologous recombination. A conjugative plasmid that is capable of chromosome integration or can exist autonomously within the cell is also called an episome (a segment of DNA that can exist as a plasmid or become integrated into the chromosome). When conjugation occurs, Hfr cells are very efficient in delivering chromosomal genes of the cell into recipient F^{−} cells, which lack the episome.

== History ==
The Hfr strain was first characterized by Luca Cavalli-Sforza. William Hayes also isolated another Hfr strain independently.

== Transfer of bacterial chromosome by Hfr cells ==
An Hfr cell can transfer a portion of the bacterial genome. Despite being integrated into the chromosomal DNA of the bacteria, the F factor of Hfr cells can still initiate conjugative transfer, without being excised from the bacterial chromosome first. Due to the F factor's inherent tendency to transfer itself during conjugation, the rest of the bacterial genome is dragged along with it. Therefore, unlike a normal F^{+} cell, Hfr strains will attempt to transfer their entire DNA through the mating bridge, in a fashion similar to the normal conjugation. In a typical conjugation, the recipient cell also becomes F^{+} after conjugation as it receives an entire copy of the F factor plasmid; but this is not the case in conjugation mediated by Hfr cells. Due to the large size of bacterial chromosome, it is very rare for the entire chromosome to be transferred into the F ^{−} cell as time required is simply too long for the cells to maintain their physical contact. Therefore, as the conjugative transfer is not complete (the circular nature of plasmid and bacterial chromosome requires complete transfer for the F factor to be transferred as it may be cut in the middle), the recipient F^{−} cells do not receive the complete F factor sequence, and do not become F ^{+} due to its inability to form a sex pilus.

== Interrupted mating technique ==
In conjugation mediated by Hfr cells, transfer of DNA starts at the origin of transfer (oriT) located within the F factor and then continues clockwise or counterclockwise depending on the orientation of F factor in the chromosome. Therefore, the length of chromosomal DNA transferred into the F^{−} cell is proportional to the time that conjugation is allowed to happen. This results in sequential transfer of genes on the bacterial chromosome. Bacterial geneticists make use of this principle to map the genes on the bacterial chromosome. This technique is called interrupted mating as geneticists allow conjugation to take place for different periods of time before stopping conjugation with a high-speed blender. By using Hfr and F^{−} strains with one strain carrying mutations in several genes, each affecting a metabolic function or causing antibiotic resistance, and examining the phenotype of the recipient cells on selective agar plates, one can deduce which genes are transferred into the recipient cells first and therefore are closer to the oriT sequence on the chromosome.

== The F-prime cell ==
F-prime cell contains F-plasmid that integrates with the chromosomal DNA and carries part of the chromosomal DNA along with it while being excised from the chromosome. Thus F-prime plasmid is the plasmid, containing part of the chromosomal DNA which can be transferred to recipient cell, along with the plasmid during conjugation.
