= Type IV secretion system =

Protein complex found in bacteria and archaea

The bacterial type IV secretion system, also known as the type IV secretion system or the T4SS, is a secretion protein complex found in gram negative bacteria, gram positive bacteria, and archaea. It is able to transport proteins and DNA across the cell membrane. The type IV secretion system is just one of many bacterial secretion systems. Type IV secretion systems are related to conjugation machinery which generally involve a single-step secretion system and the use of a pilus. Type IV secretion systems are used for conjugation, DNA exchange with the extracellular space, and for delivering proteins to target cells. The type IV secretion system is divided into type IVA and type IVB based on genetic ancestry.

Notable instances of the type IV secretion system include the plasmid insertion into plants of Agrobacterium tumefaciens, the toxin delivery methods of Bordetella pertussis (whooping cough) and Legionella pneumophila (Legionnaires' disease), the translocation of effector proteins into host cells by bacteria from the Brucella genus (Brucellosis), and the F sex pilus.

== Function ==
The type IV secretion system is a protein complex found in prokaryotes used to transport DNA, proteins, or effector molecules from the cytoplasm to the extracellular space beyond the cell. The type IV secretion system is related to prokaryotic conjugation machinery. Type IV secretion systems are a highly versatile group, present in Gram positive bacteria, Gram negative bacteria, and archaea. They usually involve a single step which utilizes a pilus, though exceptions exist.

Type IV secretion systems are highly diverse, with a variety of functions and types due to different evolutionary paths. Primarily, type IV secretion systems are grouped based on structural and genetic similarity and are only distantly related to each other. Type IVA systems are similar to the VirB/D4 system of Agrobacterium tumefaciens. Type IVB systems are similar to the Dot/Icm systems found in intracellular pathogens such as Legionella pneumophila. The “other” type systems resemble neither IVA or IVB. Types are genetically distinct and use separate sets of proteins, however, proteins between the sets have strong homologies to each other, which leads them to function similarly.

Type IV secretion systems are also classified by function into three main types: conjugative systems, used for DNA transfer via cell to cell contact (a process called conjugation); DNA release and uptake systems, used to exchange DNA with the extracellular environment (a process called transformation) and effector systems, which are used to transfer proteins to target cells. Conjugative as well as DNA release and uptake systems play an important role in horizontal gene transfer, which allows prokaryotes to adapt to their environment, such as, developing antibiotic resistance. Effector systems allow for the interaction between microbes and larger organisms. The effector systems are used as a toxin delivery method by many human pathogens such as, Helicobacter pylori (stomach ulcers), whooping cough, and Legionnaires' disease.

== Structure ==
Currently, only the structure of type IVA secretion systems, which occur in gram-negative bacteria, is well described. It is composed of 12 protein subunits, VirB1 - VirB11 and VirD4, analogies of which exist in all type IVA systems. The Type IV secretion system’s components can be separated into three groups: the translocation channel scaffold, the ATPases, and the pilus.

The translocation channel scaffold is the portion of the machinery that creates the channel between extracellular space and the cytoplasm through the inner and outer membranes, and contains VirB6 - VirB10. The core complex of the scaffold is composed of 14 copies of VirB7, VirB9, and VirB10 which form a cylindrical channel that spans both membranes and connects the cytoplasm to the extracellular space.

A single protein, VirB10 is integral in both the inner and outer membranes. It inserts into the outer membrane using an α-helical barrel structure which helps form a channel between the two membranes. There is an opening on the cytoplasmic end of the channel which is followed by a large chamber and a second opening. The second opening requires a conformational change to allow substrate passage from the cytoplasm into the channel. Either VirB6 or VirB8 is believed to form the inner membrane pore, as they are integral proteins on the inner membrane and have direct contact with the substrate.

The ATPases consist of VirB4, VirB11, and VirD4, which drive the substrate motion through the channel and provide the system with energy. VirB11 belongs to a class of transmembrane transporters called “traffic ATPases”. VirB4 is not well characterized.

The pilus is composed of VirB2 and VirB5, with VirB2 being the major component. In A. tumefaciens, the pilus is 8-12 nm in diameter, and less than one μm in length. F pili, another commonly examined type of pilus, are much longer with a length of 2-20 μm.

== Mechanism ==
Due to the wide variety of type IV secretion systems in both origin and function, it is difficult to state much mechanistically about the group as a whole.

In general, after DNA is packaged in a conjugative system it is recruited by ATPase analogues to the VirD4 coupling protein, then translocated through the pilus. In A. tumefaciens specifically, the DNA passes through a characterized chain of enzymes before reaching the pilus. The DNA is recruited by VirD4, then VirB11, then to the intermembrane proteins (VirB6, and VirB8), moved to VirB9, and finally sent to the pilus (VirB2).
