= F-plasmid =

Sequence of bacterial DNA

The F-plasmid (first named F by one of its discoverers Esther Lederberg；also called the sex factor in E. coli, the F sex factor, the fertility factor, or simply the F factor) allows genes to be transferred from one bacterium carrying the factor to another bacterium lacking the factor by conjugation. The F factor was the first plasmid to be discovered. Unlike other similar plasmids, the F factor has constitutive expression of transfer proteins due to a mutation in the gene finO. The F plasmid belongs to F-like plasmids, a class of conjugative plasmids that control sexual functions of bacteria with a fertility inhibition (Fin) system.

== Discovery ==
Esther M. Lederberg and Luigi L. Cavalli-Sforza discovered "F," subsequently publishing with Joshua Lederberg. Once her results were announced, two other labs joined the studies. "This was not a simultaneous independent discovery of F (I named this as Fertility Factor until it was understood.) We wrote to Hayes, Jacob, & Wollman who then proceeded with their studies." The discovery of "F" has sometimes been confused with William Hayes' discovery of "sex factor", though he never claimed priority. Indeed, "he [Hayes] thought F was really lambda, and when we convinced him [that it was not], he then began his work."

== Structure ==
The most common functional segments constituting F factors are:

- oriT (origin of transfer): The sequence which marks the starting point of conjugative transfer.
- oriV (origin of vegetative replication): The sequence starting with which the plasmid-DNA will be replicated in the recipient cell.
- tra-region (transfer genes): Genes coding the F-Pilus and DNA transfer process.
- IS (Insertion Elements) composed of one copy of IS2, two copies of IS3, and one copy of IS1000: so-called "selfish genes" (sequence fragments which can integrate copies of themselves at different locations).

Some F plasmid genes and their Function:

- traA: F-pilin, Major subunit of the F-pilus.
- traN: recognizes cell-surface receptors

== Relation to the genome ==
The episome that harbors the F factor can exist as an independent plasmid or integrate into the bacterial cell's genome. There are several names for the possible states:

- Hfr bacteria possess the entire F episome integrated into the bacterial genome.
- F^{+} bacteria possess F factor as a plasmid independent of the bacterial genome. The F plasmid contains only F factor DNA and no DNA from the bacterial genome.
- F' (F-prime) bacteria are formed by incorrect excision from the chromosome, resulting in F plasmid carrying bacterial sequences that are next to where the F episome has been inserted.
- F^{−} bacteria do not contain F factor and act as the recipients.

== Function ==
When an F^{+} cell conjugates/mates with an F^{−} cell, the result is two F^{+} cells, both capable of transmitting the plasmid to other F^{−} cells by conjugation. A pilus on the F+ cell interacts with the recipient cell allowing formation of a mating junction, the DNA is nicked on one strand, unwound and transferred to the recipient.

The F-plasmid belongs to a class of conjugative plasmids that control sexual functions of bacteria with a fertility inhibition (Fin) system. In this system, a trans-acting factor, FinO, and antisense RNAs, FinP, combine to repress the expression of the activator protein TraJ. TraJ is a transcription factor that upregulates the tra operon. The tra operon includes genes required for conjugation and plasmid transfer. This means that an F^{+} bacteria can always act as a donor cell. The finO gene of the original F plasmid (in E. coli K12) is interrupted by an IS3 insertion, resulting in constitutive tra operon expression. F^{+} cells also have the surface exclusion proteins TraS and TraT on the bacterial surface. These proteins prevent secondary mating events involving plasmids belonging to the same incompatibility (Inc) group. Thus, each F^{+} bacterium can host only a single plasmid type of any given incompatibility group.

In the case of Hfr transfer, the resulting transconjugates are rarely Hfr. The result of Hfr/F^{−}conjugation is a F^{−} strain with a new genotype. When F-prime plasmids are transferred to a recipient bacterial cell, they carry pieces of the donor's DNA that can become important in recombination. Bioengineers have created F plasmids that can contain inserted foreign DNA; this is called a bacterial artificial chromosome.

The first DNA helicase ever described is encoded on the F-plasmid and is responsible for initiating plasmid transfer. It was originally called E. coli DNA Helicase I, but is now known as F-plasmid TraI. In addition to being a helicase, the 1756 amino acid (one of the largest in E. coli) F-plasmid TraI protein is also responsible for both specific and non-specific single-stranded DNA binding as well as catalyzing the nicking of single-stranded DNA at the origin of transfer.

== See also ==
- FlmB RNA
- Fosmid
- Hfr cell
- Bacterial conjugation
