= Relaxase =

A relaxase is a single-strand DNA transesterase enzyme produced by some prokaryotes and viruses. Relaxases are responsible for site- and strand-specific nicks in unwound double-stranded DNA . Known relaxases belong to the rolling circle replication (RCR) initiator superfamily of enzymes and fall into two broad classes: replicative (Rep) and mobilization (Mob). The nicks produced by Rep relaxases initiate plasmid or virus RCR. Mob relaxases nick at origin of transfer (oriT) to initiate the process of DNA mobilization and transfer known as bacterial conjugation. Relaxases are so named because the single-stranded DNA nick that they catalyze lead to relaxation of helical tension.

== Structure and mechanism ==
Known relaxases are metal ion dependent tyrosine transesterases. This means that they use a metal ion to aid the transfer of an ester bond from the DNA phosphodiester backbone to a catalytic tyrosine side chain, resulting in a long-lived covalent phosphotyrosine intermediate that essentially unified the nicked DNA strand and the enzyme as one molecule. Preliminary reports of relaxase inhibition by small molecules that mimic intermediates of this reaction were first reported in 2007. Such inhibition has implications related to preventing the propagation of antibiotic resistance in clinical settings.

The first relaxase x-ray crystal and NMR structures – of Rep relaxases from tomato yellow leaf curl virus (TYLCV) and adeno associated virus serotype 5 (AAV-5) – were solved in 2002. These revealed compact molecules composed of five-stranded, antiparallel beta sheet cores and peripheral alpha helices. A histidine-rich motif, previously identified by sequence conservation, was shown to be a metal ion binding site located on the beta sheet core, nearby the carboxy-terminal catalytic tyrosine residue. Later structures of the Mob relaxases TrwC from plasmid R388 and TraI from the F-plasmid confirmed that the Mob and Rep classes are evolutionarily related to one another through circular permutation. This means that they share a general fold, but the amino-terminal sequence of one is homologous to the C-terminus of the other, and vice versa. Thus the Catalytic tyrosines of TraI and TrwC are amino-terminal rather than carboxy-terminal.

== Etymology ==
Relaxase nomenclature is varied. In conjugative bacterial plasmids, Mob-class relaxases go by names such as TraI (in plasmid RP4), VirD2 (pTi), TrwC (R388), TraI (F-plasmid), MobB (CloDF13), or TrsK (pGO1).

== See also ==
- Bacterial conjugation
- Rolling circle replication
- TraA
- Virus
