= Transfer gene =

Genes necessary for transfer of genetic material

Transfer genes or tra genes (also transfer operons or tra operons), are some genes necessary for non-sexual transfer of genetic material in both gram-positive and gram-negative bacteria. The tra locus includes the pilin gene and regulatory genes, which together form pili on the cell surface, polymeric proteins that can attach themselves to the surface of F-bacteria and initiate the conjugation. The existence of the tra region of a plasmid genome was first discovered in 1979 by David H. Figurski and Donald R. Helinski In the course of their work, Figurski and Helinski also discovered a second key fact about the tra region – that it can act in trans to the mobilization marker which it affects.

This finding suggested that there were two basic aspects necessary for a plasmid to move from one cell to another:

1. An origin of transfer – A plasmid with no origin of transfer is non-mobilizable.
2. The transfer genes – Though a functioning set of tra genes is necessary for plasmid transfer, they may be located in a variety of places including the plasmid in question, another plasmid in the same host cell, or even in the bacterial genome.

The roles of some tra-gene encoded proteins:
Pili assembly and production	traA, traB, traC, traE, traF, traG, traH, traK, traL, traQ, traU, traV, traW
Inner membrane proteins	traB, traE, traG, traL, traP
Periplasmic proteins	traC, traF, traH traK, traU, traW
DNA transfer	traC, traD, traI, traM, traY
Surface exclusion proteins	traS, traT
Mating pair stabilization	traG, traN
Target specificity	traN

The tra genes encode proteins which are useful for the propagation of the plasmid from the host cell to a compatible donor cell or maintenance of the plasmid. Not all transfer operons are the same. Some genes are only found in a few species or a single genus of bacteria while others (such as traL) are found in very similar forms in many bacterial species. Many of the transfer systems are incompatible. For example, oriT and bom are two origins of transfer which interact with different sets of transfer genes. A plasmid with a mob site (like many found in Rhodococcus species) cannot be transferred via transfer genes which normally interact with the oriT site (which is common in E. coli)

Each of the individual genes in the tra operon codes for a different protein product. These products may perform a number of tasks including interaction with one another to perform mating pair functions and regulation of different regions of the tra operon itself, or conjugative DNA metabolism and surface exclusion. Also, note that some proteins perform multiple functions or are associated closely with proteins which have non-similar functions.
