= Bacterial conjugation =

Method of bacterial gene transfer

Bacterial conjugation is the transfer of genetic material between bacterial cells by direct cell-to-cell contact or by a bridge-like connection between two cells. This typically takes place through a type IV secretion system, a type of pilus. It is a parasexual mode of reproduction in bacteria.

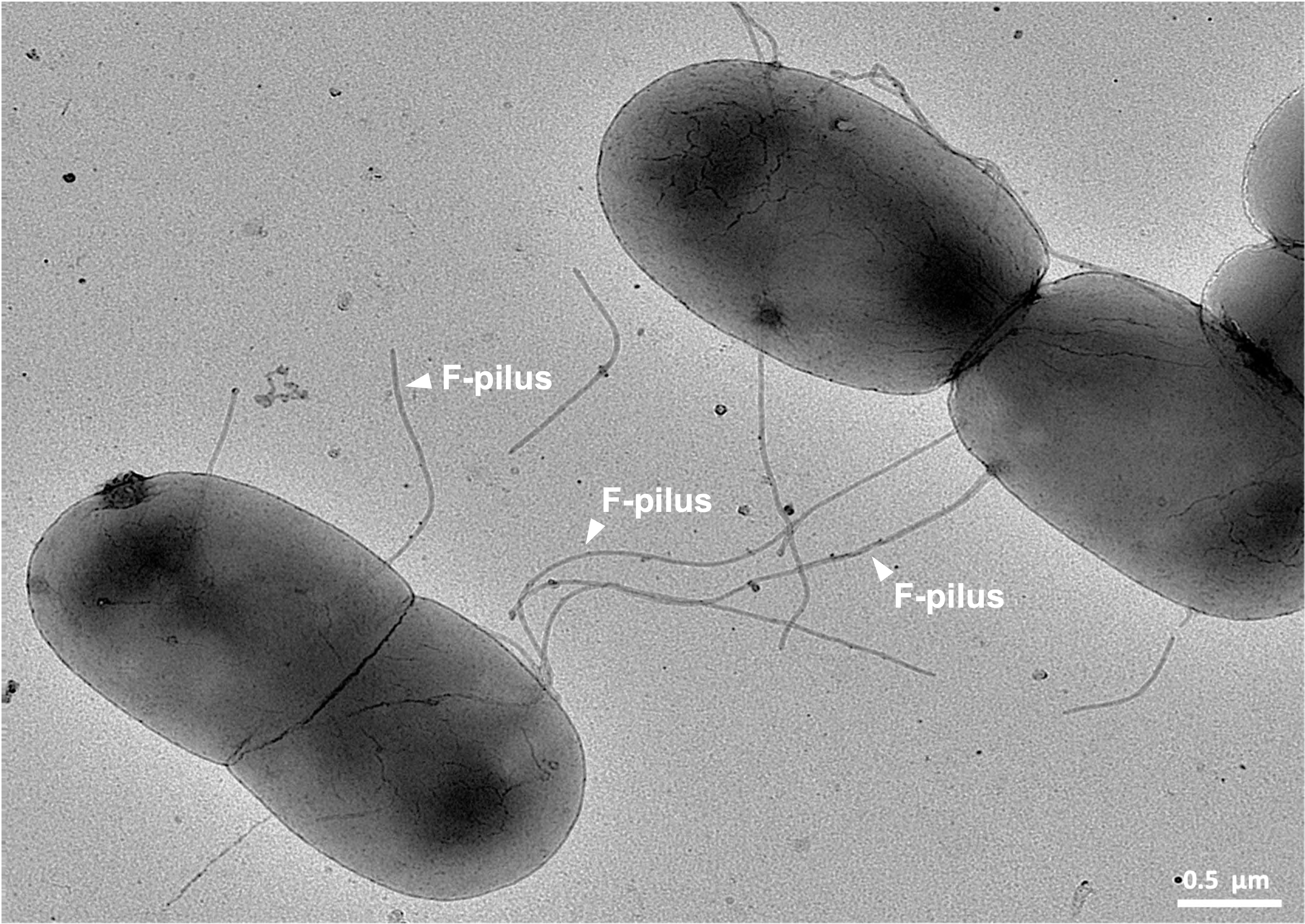
Escherichia coli conjugating using F-pili. These long and robust extracellular appendages serve as physical conduits to translocate DNA.

It is a mechanism of horizontal gene transfer as are transformation and transduction although these two other mechanisms do not involve cell-to-cell contact.

Classical E. coli bacterial conjugation is often regarded as the bacterial equivalent of sexual reproduction or mating, since it involves the exchange of genetic material. However, it is not sexual reproduction, since no exchange of gamete occurs, and indeed no generation of a new organism: instead, an existing organism is transformed. During classical E. coli conjugation, the donor cell provides a conjugative or mobilizable genetic element that is most often a plasmid or transposon. Most conjugative plasmids have systems ensuring that the recipient cell does not already contain a similar element.

The genetic information transferred is often beneficial to the recipient. Benefits may include antibiotic resistance, xenobiotic tolerance or the ability to use new metabolites. Other elements can be detrimental, and may be viewed as bacterial parasites.

Conjugation in Escherichia coli by spontaneous zygogenesis and in Mycobacterium smegmatis by distributive conjugal transfer differ from the better studied classical E. coli conjugation in that these cases involve substantial blending of the parental genomes.

== History ==
The process was discovered by Joshua Lederberg and Edward Tatum in 1946.

== Mechanism ==
Schematic drawing of bacterial conjugation by the F-plasmid.

Conjugation diagram

1. Donor cell produces the pilus (typically a type IV secretion system); necessary genes are expressed from the conjugative plasmid.
2. Pilus attaches to recipient cell and brings the two cells together.
3. The mobile plasmid is nicked and a single strand of DNA is then transferred to the recipient cell.
4. Both cells synthesize a complementary strand to produce a double stranded circular plasmid and also reproduce pili; both cells are now viable donors for the conjugative plasmid.

The F-factor is an episome (a plasmid that can integrate itself into the bacterial chromosome by homologous recombination) with a length of about 100 kb. It is a classical example of a conjugative plasmid. It carries its own origin of replication, the oriV, and an origin of transfer, or oriT. There can only be one copy of the F-plasmid in a given bacterium, either free or integrated, and bacteria that possess a copy are called F-positive or F-plus (denoted F^{+}). Cells that lack F plasmids are called F-negative or F-minus (F^{−}) and as such can function as recipient cells.

Among other genetic information, the F-plasmid carries a tra and trb locus, which together are about 33 kb long and consist of about 40 genes. The tra locus includes the pilin gene and regulatory genes, which together form pili on the cell surface. The locus also includes the genes for the proteins that attach themselves to the surface of F^{−} bacteria and initiate conjugation. Though there is some debate on the exact mechanism of conjugation it seems that the pili are the structures through which DNA exchange occurs. The F-pili are extremely resistant to mechanical and thermochemical stress, which guarantees successful conjugation in a variety of environments. Several proteins coded for in the tra or trb locus seem to open a channel between the bacteria and it is thought that the TraD enzyme, located at the base of the pilus, initiates membrane fusion.

When conjugation is initiated by a signal, the relaxase enzyme creates a nick in one of the strands of the conjugative plasmid at the oriT. Relaxase may work alone, or in a complex of over a dozen proteins known collectively as a relaxosome. In the F-plasmid system, the relaxase enzyme is called TraI and the relaxosome consists of TraI, TraY, TraM and the integrated host factor IHF. The nicked strand, or T-strand, is then unwound from the unbroken strand and transferred to the recipient cell in a 5'-terminus to 3'-terminus direction. The strand is thought to be transferred through the pilus into the recipient cell. The remaining strand is replicated either independent of conjugative action (vegetative replication beginning at the oriV) or in concert with conjugation (conjugative replication similar to the rolling circle replication of lambda phage). Conjugative replication may require a second nick before successful transfer can occur. A recent report claims to have inhibited conjugation with chemicals that mimic an intermediate step of this second nicking event.

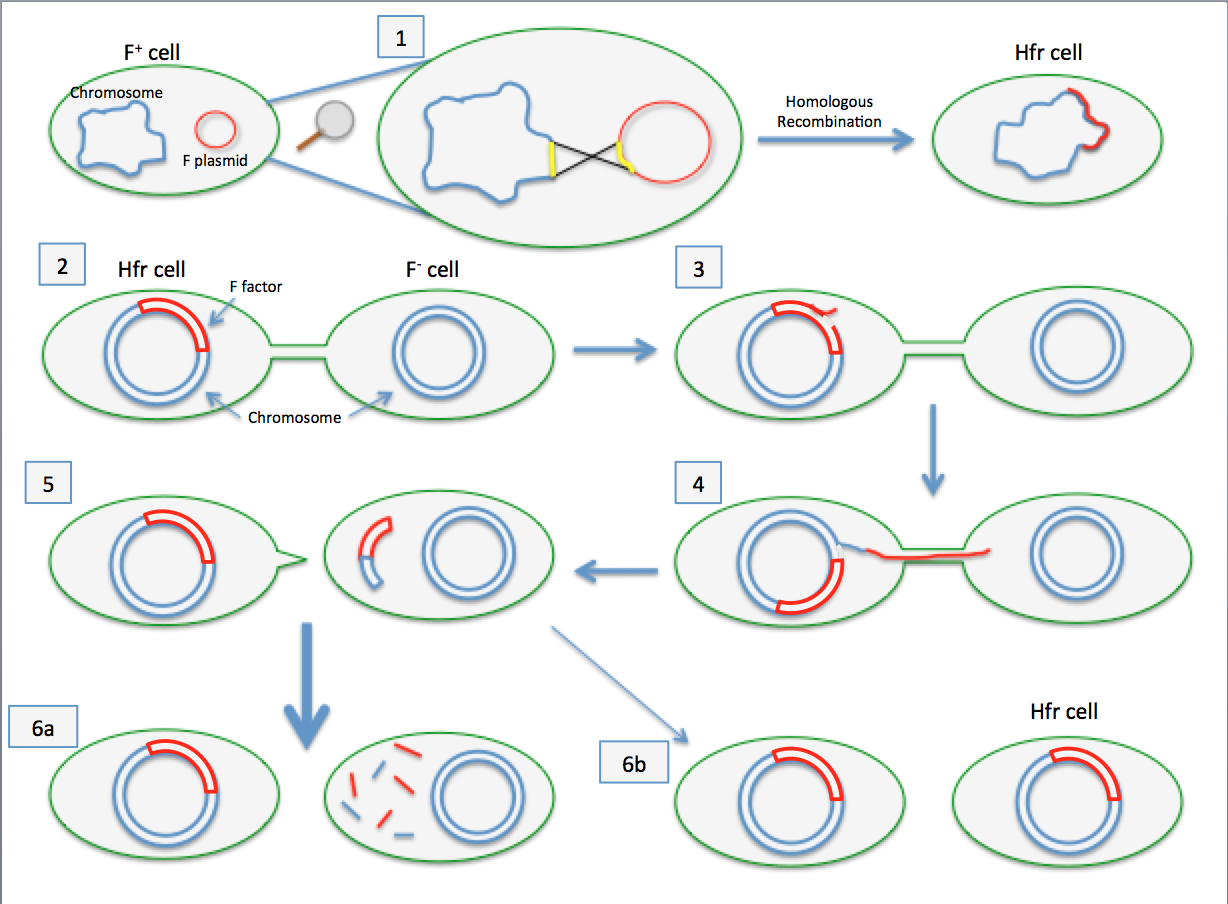
1.The insertion sequences (yellow) on both the F factor plasmid and the chromosome have similar sequences, allowing the F factor to insert itself into the genome of the cell. This is called homologous recombination and creates an Hfr (high frequency of recombination) cell. 2.The Hfr cell forms a pilus and attaches to a recipient F- cell. 3.A nick in one strand of the Hfr cell's chromosome is created. 4.DNA begins to be transferred from the Hfr cell to the recipient cell while the second strand of its chromosome is being replicated. 5.The pilus detaches from the recipient cell and retracts. The Hfr cell ideally wants to transfer its entire genome to the recipient cell. However, due to its large size and inability to keep in contact with the recipient cell, it is not able to do so. 6.a. The F- cell remains F- because the entire F factor sequence was not received. Since no homologous recombination occurred, the DNA that was transferred is degraded by enzymes. b. In very rare cases, the F factor will be completely transferred and the F- cell will become an Hfr cell.

If the F-plasmid that is transferred has previously been integrated into the donor's genome (producing an Hfr strain ["High Frequency of Recombination"]) some of the donor's chromosomal DNA may also be transferred with the plasmid DNA. The amount of chromosomal DNA that is transferred depends on how long the two conjugating bacteria remain in contact. In common laboratory strains of E. coli the transfer of the entire bacterial chromosome takes about 100 minutes. The transferred DNA can then be integrated into the recipient genome via homologous recombination.

A cell culture that contains in its population cells with non-integrated F-plasmids usually also contains a few cells that have integrated their plasmids. It is these cells that are responsible for the low-frequency chromosomal gene transfers that occur in such cultures. Some strains of bacteria with an integrated F-plasmid can be isolated and grown in pure culture. Because such strains transfer chromosomal genes very efficiently they are called Hfr (high frequency of recombination). The E. coli genome was originally mapped by interrupted mating experiments in which various Hfr cells in the process of conjugation were sheared from recipients after less than 100 minutes (initially using a Waring blender). The genes that were transferred were then investigated.

Since integration of the F-plasmid into the E. coli chromosome is a rare spontaneous occurrence, and since the numerous genes promoting DNA transfer are in the plasmid genome rather than in the bacterial genome, it has been argued that conjugative bacterial gene transfer, as it occurs in the E. coli Hfr system, is not an evolutionary adaptation of the bacterial host, nor is it likely ancestral to eukaryotic sex.

Spontaneous zygogenesis in E. coli

In addition to classical bacterial conjugation described above for E. coli, a form of conjugation referred to as spontaneous zygogenesis (Z-mating for short) is observed in certain strains of E. coli. In Z-mating there is complete genetic mixing, and unstable diploids are formed that throw off phenotypically haploid cells, of which some show a parental phenotype and some are true recombinants.

== Conjugal transfer in mycobacteria ==
Conjugation in Mycobacteria smegmatis, like conjugation in E. coli, requires stable and extended contact between a donor and a recipient strain, is DNase resistant, and the transferred DNA is incorporated into the recipient chromosome by homologous recombination. However, unlike E. coli Hfr conjugation, mycobacterial conjugation is chromosome rather than plasmid based. Furthermore, in contrast to E. coli Hfr conjugation, in M. smegmatis all regions of the chromosome are transferred with comparable efficiencies. The lengths of the donor segments vary widely, but have an average length of 44.2kb. Since a mean of 13 tracts are transferred, the average total of transferred DNA per genome is 575kb. This process is referred to as "Distributive conjugal transfer." Gray et al. found substantial blending of the parental genomes as a result of conjugation and regarded this blending as reminiscent of that seen in the meiotic products of sexual reproduction.

== Conjugation-like DNA transfer in hyperthermophilic archaea ==
Hyperthermophilic archaea encode pili structurally similar to the bacterial conjugative pili. However, unlike in bacteria, where conjugation apparatus typically mediates the transfer of mobile genetic elements, such as plasmids or transposons, the conjugative machinery of hyperthermophilic archaea, called Ced (Crenarchaeal system for exchange of DNA) and Ted (Thermoproteales system for exchange of DNA), appears to be responsible for the transfer of cellular DNA between members of the same species. It has been suggested that in these archaea the conjugation machinery has been fully domesticated for promoting DNA repair through homologous recombination rather than spread of mobile genetic elements. In addition to the VirB2-like conjugative pilus, the Ced and Ted systems include components for the VirB6-like transmembrane mating pore and the VirB4-like ATPase.

== Inter-kingdom transfer ==
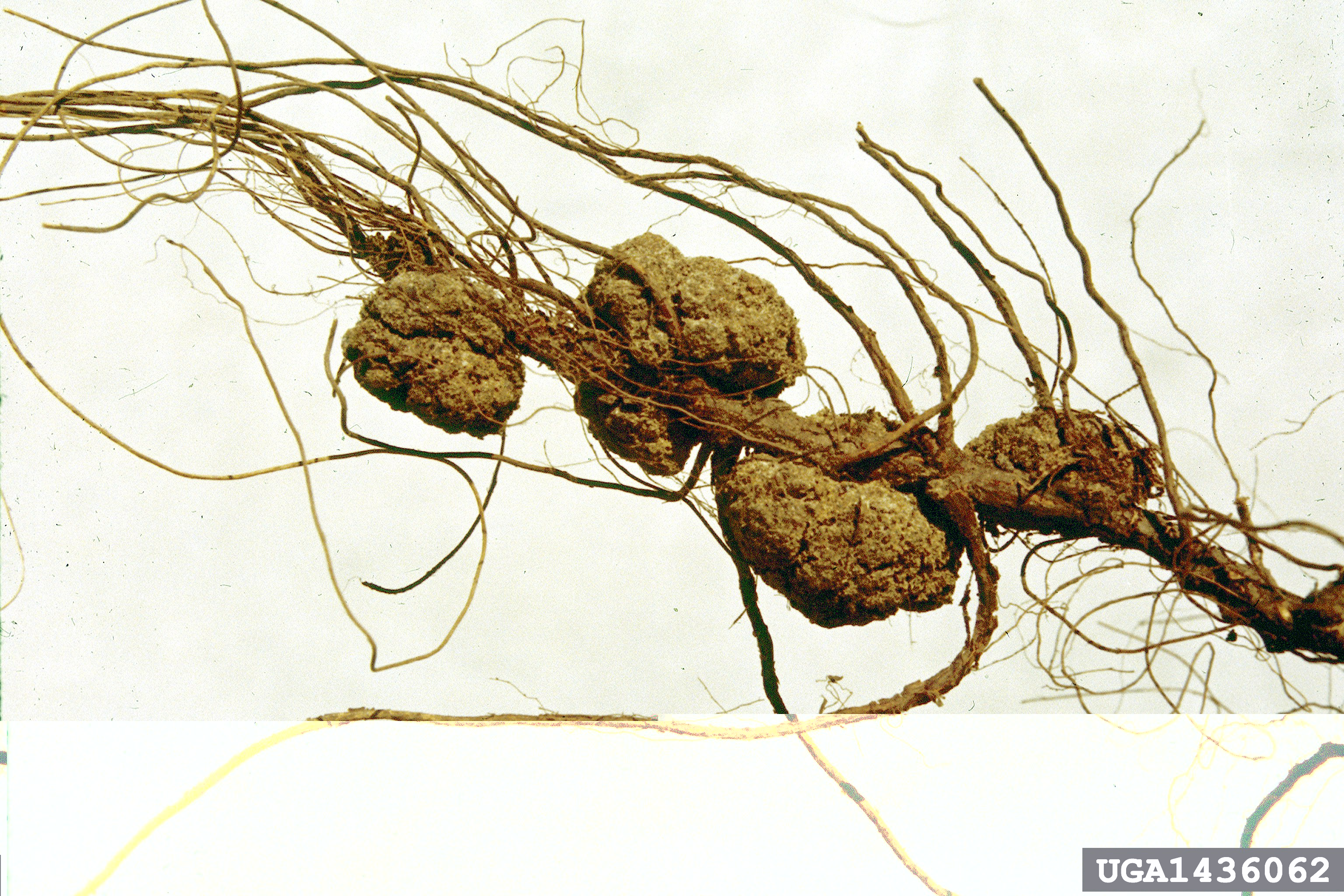
Agrobacterium tumefaciens gall at the root of Carya illinoensis.

Bacteria related to the nitrogen fixing Rhizobia are an interesting case of inter-kingdom conjugation. For example, the tumor-inducing (Ti) plasmid of Agrobacterium and the root-tumor inducing (Ri) plasmid of A. rhizogenes contain genes that are capable of transferring to plant cells. The expression of these genes effectively transforms the plant cells into opine-producing factories. Opines are used by the bacteria as sources of nitrogen and energy. Infected cells form crown gall or root tumors. The Ti and Ri plasmids are thus endosymbionts of the bacteria, which are in turn endosymbionts (or parasites) of the infected plant.

The Ti and Ri plasmids can also be transferred between bacteria using a system (the tra, or transfer, operon) that is different and independent of the system used for inter-kingdom transfer (the vir, or virulence, operon). Such transfers create virulent strains from previously avirulent strains.

== Genetic engineering applications ==
Conjugation is a convenient means for transferring genetic material to a variety of targets. In laboratories, successful transfers have been reported from bacteria to yeast, plants, mammalian cells, diatoms and isolated mammalian mitochondria. Conjugation has advantages over other forms of genetic transfer including minimal disruption of the target's cellular envelope and the ability to transfer relatively large genetic materials (see the above discussion of E. coli chromosome transfer). In plant engineering, Agrobacterium-like conjugation complements other standard vehicles such as tobacco mosaic virus (TMV). While TMV is capable of infecting many plant families these are primarily herbaceous dicots. Agrobacterium-like conjugation is also primarily used for dicots, but monocot recipients are not uncommon.

== See also ==
- Transformation
- Transduction
- Sexual conjugation in algae and ciliates
- Transfection
- Triparental mating
- Zygotic induction
