= Recombinase-mediated cassette exchange =

RMCE (recombinase-mediated cassette exchange) is a procedure in reverse genetics allowing the systematic, repeated modification of higher eukaryotic genomes by targeted integration, based on the features of site-specific recombination processes (SSRs). For RMCE, this is achieved by the clean exchange of a preexisting gene cassette for an analogous cassette carrying the "gene of interest" (GOI).

The genetic modification of mammalian cells is a standard procedure for the production of correctly modified proteins with pharmaceutical relevance. To be successful, the transfer and expression of the transgene has to be highly efficient and should have a largely predictable outcome. Current developments in the field of gene therapy are based on the same principles. Traditional procedures used for transfer of GOIs are not sufficiently reliable, mostly because the relevant epigenetic influences have not been sufficiently explored: transgenes integrate into chromosomes with low efficiency and at loci that provide only sub-optimal conditions for their expression. As a consequence the newly introduced information may not be realized (expressed), the gene(s) may be lost and/or re-insert and they may render the target cells in unstable state. It is exactly this point where RMCE enters the field. The procedure was introduced in 1994 and it uses the tools yeasts and bacteriophages have evolved for the efficient replication of important genetic information:

== General principles ==
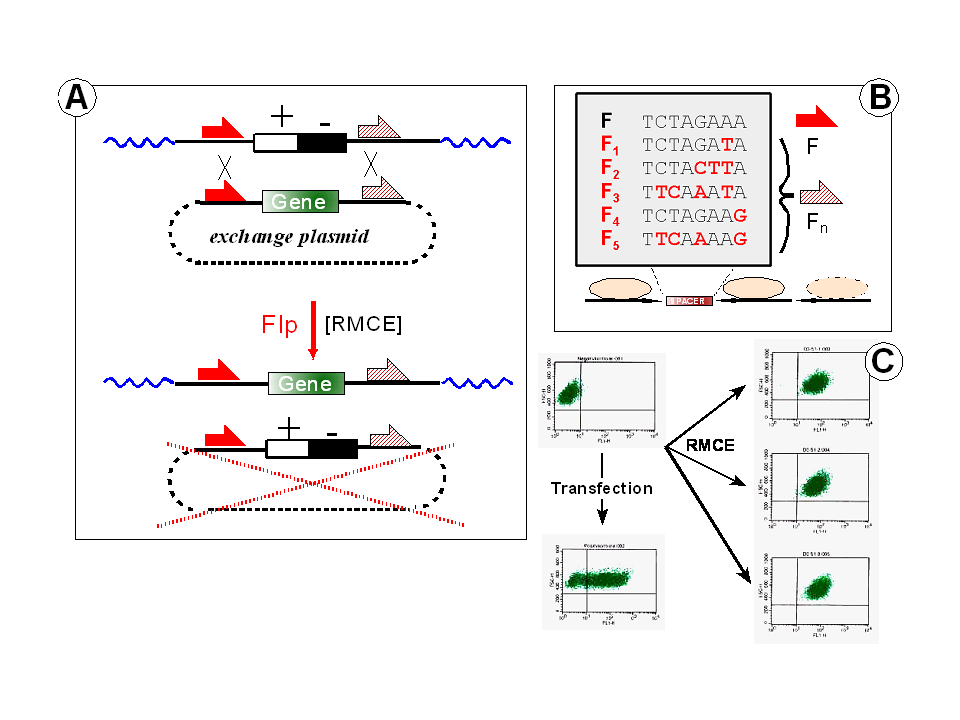
Figure 1: Principle of RMCE: exchange of genetic cassettes (´flip´ step) is enabled by a recombinase (´Flp´) from yeast. Part B shows mutants (Fn) of the naturally occurring 48 bp FRT-site (F). If a gene cassette is flanked by a set of these sites (F and Fn, for example) it can change places, by double-reciprocal recombination, with a second cassette that is part of an exchange plasmid (Figure 1, part A). A model experiment is shown in part C, in which an ´empty´ cell is modified by either a standard transfection approach or by RMCE. Please note that in the first case multiple genomic sites are hit, each giving raise to a different expression level (cf. the broad distribution of green dots). If a pre-defined genomic address is used to introduce the same gene reporter, each clone derived from such an event shows comparable expression characteristics

Most yeast strains contain circular, plasmid-like DNAs called "two-micron circles". The persistence of these entities is granted by a recombinase called "flippase" or "Flp". Four monomers of this enzyme associate with two identical short (48 bp) target sites, called FRT ("flip-recombinase targets"), resulting in their crossover. The outcome of such a process depends on the relative orientation of the participating FRTs leading to

- the inversion of a sequence that is flanked by two identical but inversely oriented FRT sites
- the deletion/resolution of a sequence that is flanked by two equally oriented identical FRTs
- the inefficient reversion of the letter process, commonly called integration or "addition" of an extra piece of DNA carrying a single FRT site identical to the target site

This spectrum of options could be extended significantly by the generation of spacer mutants for extended 48 bp FRT sites (cross-hatched half-arrows in Figure 1). Each mutant Fn recombines with an identical mutant Fn with an efficiency equal to the wildtype sites (F x F). A cross-interaction (F x Fn) is strictly prevented by the particular design of these components. This sets the stage for the situation depicted in Figure 1A:

- a target cassette (here a composite +/- selection marker) is flanked by an F- and an Fn site. After its introduction into the genome of a host cell the properties of many integration sites (genomic ´addresses´) are characterized and appropriate clones are isolated
- the GOI (gene-of-interest) is part of a circular ´exchange plasmid´ and is flanked by a set of matching sites. This exchange plasmid can be introduced into the cell at large molecular excess and will thereby undergo the depicted exchange (RMCE-) reaction with the pre-selected genomic address (i.e. the F <+/-> Fn target)
- this RMCE-principle is a process that can be repeated with the same or a different exchange plasmid ("serial RMCE"). Please note that RMCE introduces just one copy of the GOI at the pre-determined locus and that it does not co-introduce prokaryotic vector sequences (dotted lines) that would otherwise trigger immunologic or epigenetic defense mechanisms.

First applied for the Tyr-recombinase Flp, this novel procedure is not only relevant to the rational construction of biotechnologically significant cell lines, but it also finds increasing use for the systematic generation of stem cells. Stem cells can be used to replace damaged tissue or to generate transgenic animals with largely pre-determined properties.

== Dual RMCE ==
It has been previously established that coexpression of both Cre and Flp recombinases catalyzes the exchange of sequences flanked by single loxP and FRT sites integrated into the genome at a random location. However, these studies did not explore whether such an approach could be used to modify conditional mouse alleles carrying single or multiple loxP and FRT sites. dual RMCE (dRMCE; Osterwalder et al., 2010) was recently developed as a re-engineering tool applicable to the vast numbers of mouse conditional alleles that harbor wild-type loxP and FRT sites and therefore are not compatible with conventional RMCE. The general dRMCE strategy takes advantage of the fact that most conditional alleles encode a selection cassette flanked by FRT sites, in addition to loxP sites that flank functionally relevant exons ('floxed' exons). The FRT-flanked selection cassette is in general placed outside the loxP-flanked region, which renders these alleles directly compatible with dRMCE. Simultaneous expression of Cre and Flp recombinases induces cis recombination and formation of the deleted allele, which then serves as a 'docking site' at which to insert the replacement vector by trans recombination. The correctly replaced locus would encode the custom modification and a different drug-selection cassette flanked by single loxP and FRT sites. dRMCE therefore appears as a very efficient tool for targeted re-engineering of thousands of mouse alleles produced by the IKMC consortium.

== Multiplexing RMCE ==
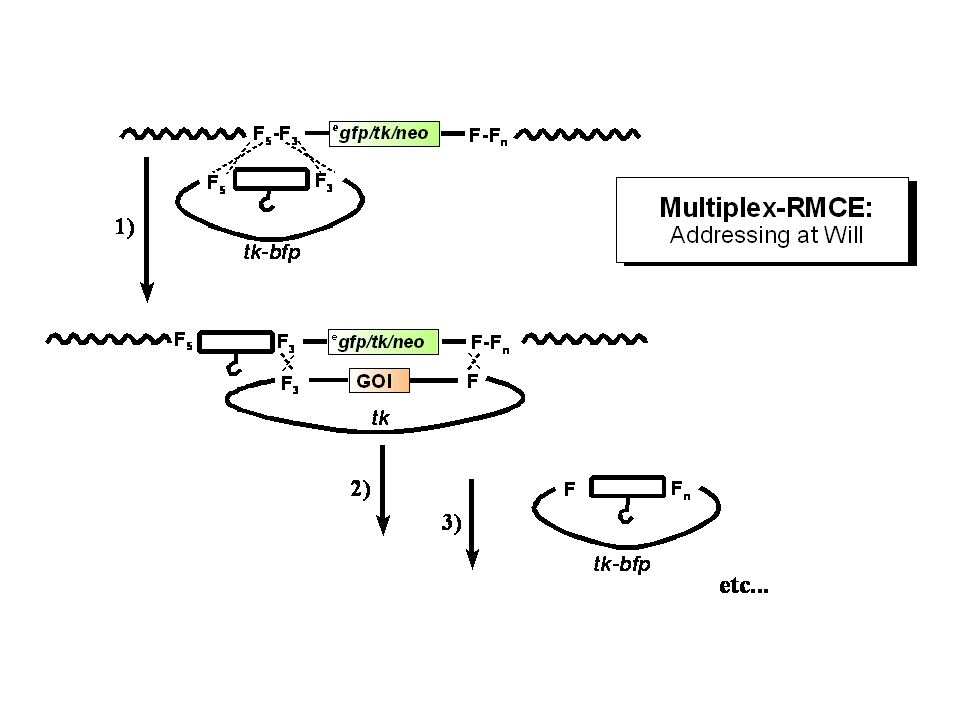
Figure 2: Multiplexing RMCE. In the given example a reporter gene cassette (gfp/tk/neo), flanked by four heterospecific FRT-sites (F5/F3-F/Fn) is introduced into the genome. The unique F5/F3 address can then be used to introduce an upstream-regulatory element and the F/Fn address to apply a similar modification at the downstream end. after the expression of the gfp-reporter has been optimized by systematic changes of this type, the central reporter cassette can be exchanged for any ´gene-of-interest´(GOI): the GOI will be flanked by the F3 and F-sites, respectively and introduced accordingly while the flanking elements will remain in place

Multiplexing setups rely on the fact that each F-Fn pair (consisting of a wildtype FRT site and a mutant called "n") or each Fn-Fm pair (consisting of two mutants, "m" and "n") constitutes a unique "address" in the genome. A prerequisite are differences in four out of the eight spacer positions (see Figure 1B). If the difference is below this threshold, some cross-interaction between the mutants may occur leading to a faulty deletion of the sequence between the heterospecific (Fm/Fn or F/Fn) sites.

13 FRT-mutants have meanwhile become available, which permit the establishment of several unique genomic addresses side-by side (for instance F-Fn and Fm-Fo). These addresses will be recognized by donor plasmids that have been designed according to the same principles, permitting successive (but also synchronous) modifications at the predetermined loci. These modifications can be driven to completion in case the compatible donor plasmid(s) are provided at an excess (mass-action principles). Figure 2 illustrates one use of the multiplexing principle: the stepwise extension of a coding region in which a basic expression unit is provided with genomic insulators, enhancers, or other cis-acting elements.

A recent variation of the general concept is based on PhiC31 (an integrase of the Ser-class), which permits introduction of another RMCE target at a secondary site after the first RMCE-based modification has occurred. This is due to the fact that each phiC31-catalyzed exchange destroys the attP and attB sites it has addressed converting them to attR and attL product sites, respectively. While these changes permit the subsequent mounting of new (and most likely remote) targets, they do not enable addressing several RMCE targets in parallel, nor do they permit "serial RMCE", i.e. successive, stepwise modifications at a given genomic locus.

This is different for Flp-RMCE, for which the post-RMCE status of FRTs corresponds to their initial state. This property enables the intentional, repeated mobilization of a target cassette by the addition of a new donor plasmid with compatible architecture. These "multiplexing-RMCE" options open unlimited possibilities for serial- and parallel specific modifications of pre-determined RMCE-targets

== Applications ==
=== Generation of transgenic animals ===
Generation of transgenic knock-out/-in mice and their genetic modification by RMCE.

=== Tagging and cassette exchange in DG44 cells in suspension culture ===
Insertion of a target cassette in a mammalian host cell line (CHO DG44 in suspension culture) and exchange with an ER stress reporter construct via targeted integration (RMCE).

== See also ==
- Site-specific recombinase technology
- Site-specific recombination
- FLP-FRT recombination
- Cre recombinase
- Cre-Lox recombination
- Genetic recombination
- Homologous recombination
