= Floxing =

Genetic engineering technique

This figure depicts how Floxing is used in scientific research for spatial and temporal control of gene expression.

In genetic engineering, floxing refers to the insertion of a DNA sequence (which is then said to be floxed) between two LoxP sequences, creating an artificial gene cassette which can then be conditionally deleted (knocked out), translocated, or inverted in a process called Cre-Lox recombination. Recombination between LoxP sites is catalysed by Cre recombinase. The term "floxing" is a portmanteau constructed from the phrase "flanking/flanked by LoxP".

The floxing method is essential in the development of scientific model systems as it allows researchers to have spatial and temporal alteration of gene expression. The Cre-Lox system is widely used to manipulate gene expression in model organisms such as mice in order to study human diseases and drug development. For example, using the Cre-Lox system, researchers are able to study oncogenes and tumor suppressor genes and their role in the development and progression of cancer in mouse models.

== Uses in research ==
Floxing a gene allows it to be deleted (knocked out), translocated or inserted (through various mechanisms in Cre-Lox recombination).

The floxing of genes is essential in the development of scientific model systems as it allows spatial and temporal alteration of gene expression. In layman's terms, the gene can be knocked-out (inactivated) in a specific tissue in vivo, at a specific time chosen by the scientist. The scientist can then evaluate the effects of the knocked-out gene and identify the gene's normal function. This is different from having the gene absent starting from conception, whereby inactivation or loss of genes that are essential for the development of the organism may interfere with the normal function of cells and prevent the production of viable offspring.

=== Mechanism of deletion ===
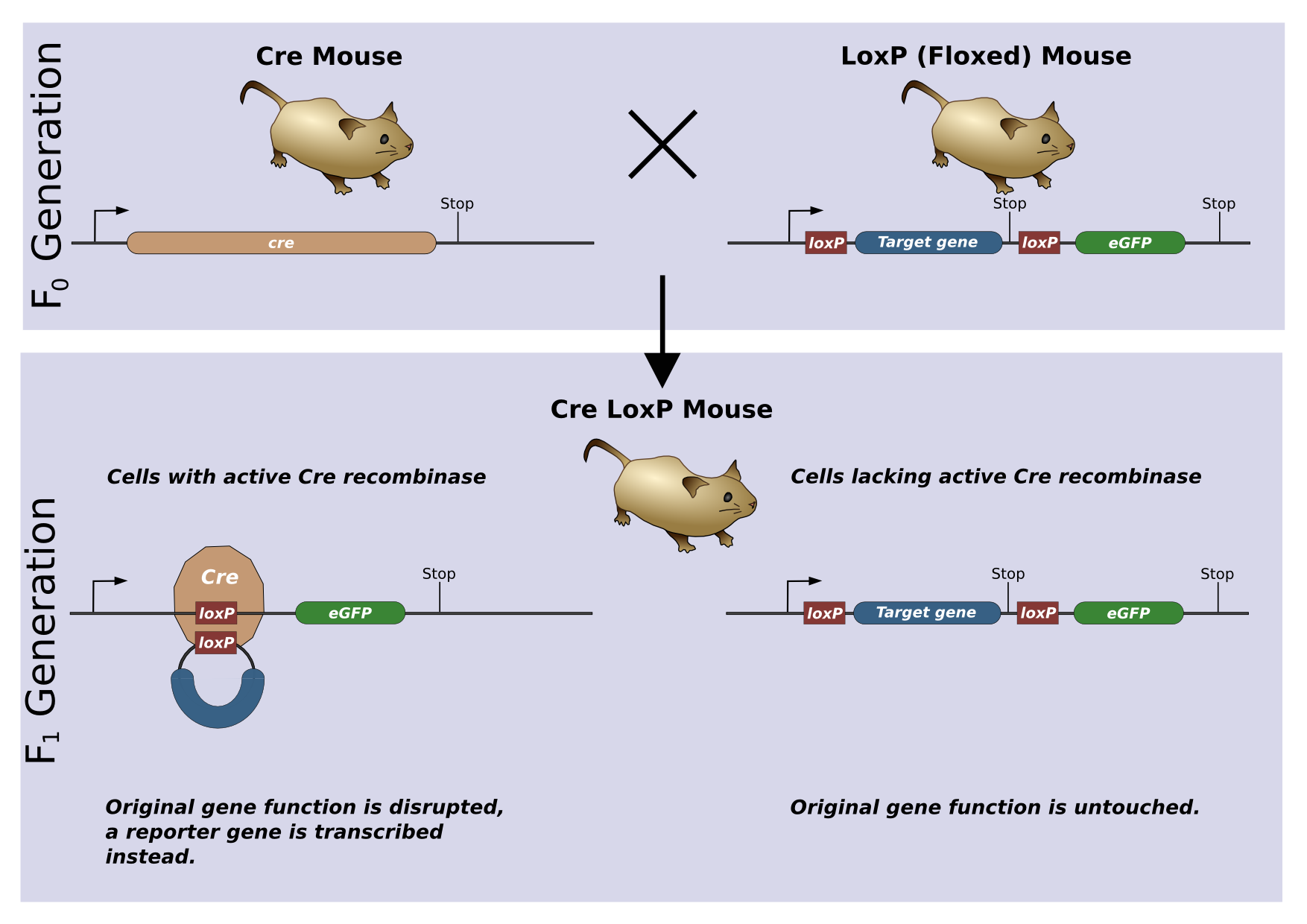
A model experiment in genetics using the Cre-lox system: the premature stop sequence present in floxed mice is removed only from cells that express Cre recombinase when the mice are bred together.

Deletion events are useful for performing gene editing experiments through precisely removing segments of or even whole genes. Deletion requires floxing of the segment of interest with loxP sites which face the same direction. The Cre recombinase will detect the unidirectional loxP sites and excise the floxed segment of DNA. The successfully edited clones can be selected using a selection marker which can be removed using the same Cre-LoxP system. The same mechanism can be used to create conditional alleles by introducing an FRT/Flp site which accomplishes the same mechanism but with a different enzyme.

=== Mechanism of inversion ===
Inversion events are useful for inactivating a gene or DNA sequence without actually removing it, and thereby maintaining a consistent amount of genetic material. The inverted genes are not often associated with abnormal phenotypes, meaning the inverted genes are generally viable. Cre-LoxP recombination that results in inversion requires loxP sites flanking the gene of interest, with the loxP sites oriented towards each other as inverted repeats. By undergoing Cre recombination, the region flanked by the loxP sites will become inverted, i.e. re-inserted in the same position but in reverse orientation; this process is not permanent and can be reversed.

=== Mechanism of translocation ===
Translocation events occur when the loxP sites flank genes on two different DNA molecules in a unidirectional orientation. Cre recombinase is then used to generate a translocation between the two DNA molecules, exchanging the genetic material from one DNA molecule to the other, forming a simultaneous translocation of both floxed genes.

== Common applications in research ==
Cardiomyocytes (heart muscle tissue) have been shown to express a type of Cre recombinase that is highly specific to cardiomyocytes and can be used by researchers to perform highly efficient recombinations. This is achieved by using a type of Cre whose expression is driven by the $\alpha$-myosin heavy chain promoter ($\alpha$-MyHC). These recombinations are capable of disrupting genes in a manner that is specific to heart tissue in vivo and allows for the creation of conditional knockouts of the heart, mostly for use as controls. For example, using the Cre recombinase with the $\alpha$-MyHC promoter causes the floxed gene to be inactivated in the heart alone. Further, these knockouts can be made inducible. In several mouse studies, tamoxifen is used to induce the expression of Cre recombinase. In this case, Cre recombinase is fused to a portion of the mouse estrogen receptor (ER) which contains a mutation within its ligand binding domain (LBD). The mutation renders the receptor inactive, which leads to incorrect localization through its interactions with chaperone proteins such as heat shock protein 70 and 90 (Hsp70 and Hsp90). Tamoxifen binds to Cre-ER and disrupts its interactions with the chaperones, which allows the Cre-ER fusion protein to enter the nucleus and perform recombination on the floxed gene. Additionally, Cre recombinase can be induced by heat when under the control of specific heat shock elements (HSEs).
