= Transgene =

Gene or genetic material that has been transferred from one organism to another

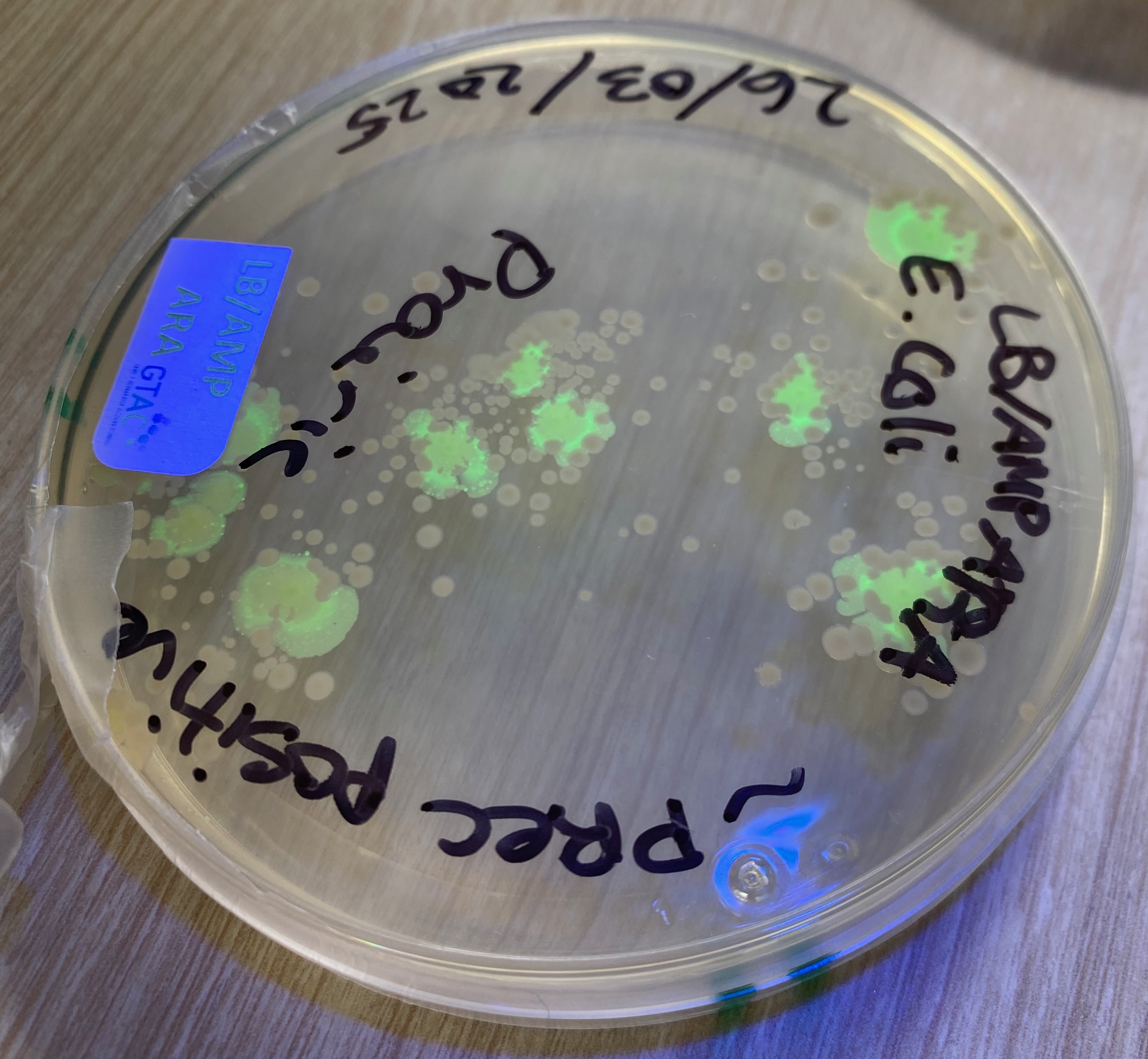
The E. coli colonies glowing green under near-UV light have been transformed with a plasmid containing the transgene green fluorescent protein from Aequorea victoria

A transgene is a gene that has been transferred naturally, or by any of a number of genetic engineering techniques, from one organism to another. The introduction of a transgene, in a process known as transgenesis, has the potential to change the phenotype of an organism. Transgene describes a segment of DNA containing a gene sequence that has been isolated from one organism and is introduced into a different organism. This non-native segment of DNA may either retain the ability to produce RNA or protein in the transgenic organism or alter the normal function of the transgenic organism's genetic code. In general, the DNA is incorporated into the organism's germ line. For example, in higher vertebrates this can be accomplished by injecting the foreign DNA into the nucleus of a fertilized ovum. This technique is routinely used to introduce human disease genes or other genes of interest into strains of laboratory mice to study the function or pathology involved with that particular gene.

The construction of a transgene requires the assembly of a few main parts. The transgene must contain a promoter, which is a regulatory sequence that will determine where and when the transgene is active, an exon, a protein coding sequence (usually derived from the cDNA for the protein of interest), and a stop sequence. These are typically combined in a bacterial plasmid and the coding sequences are typically chosen from transgenes with previously known functions.

Transgenic or genetically modified organisms, be they bacteria, viruses or fungi, serve many research purposes. Transgenic plants, insects, fish and mammals (including humans) have been bred. Transgenic plants such as corn and soybean have replaced wild strains in agriculture in some countries (e.g. the United States). Transgene escape has been documented for GMO crops since 2001 with persistence and invasiveness. Transgenetic organisms pose ethical questions and may cause biosafety problems.

== History ==
The idea of shaping an organism to fit a specific need is not a new science. However, until the late 1900s farmers and scientists could breed new strains of a plant or organism only from closely related species because the DNA had to be compatible for offspring to be able to reproduce.

In the 1970 and 1980s, scientists passed this hurdle by inventing procedures for combining the DNA of two vastly different species with genetic engineering. The organisms produced by these procedures were termed transgenic. Transgenesis is the same as gene therapy in the sense that they both transform cells for a specific purpose. However, they are completely different in their purposes, as gene therapy aims to cure a defect in cells, and transgenesis seeks to produce a genetically modified organism by incorporating the specific transgene into every cell and changing the genome. Transgenesis will therefore change the germ cells, not only the somatic cells, in order to ensure that the transgenes are passed down to the offspring when the organisms reproduce. Transgenes alter the genome by blocking the function of a host gene; they can either replace the host gene with one that codes for a different protein, or introduce an additional gene.

The first transgenic organism was created in 1974 when Annie Chang and Stanley Cohen expressed Staphylococcus aureus genes in Escherichia coli. In 1978, yeast cells were the first eukaryotic organisms to undergo gene transfer. Mouse cells were first transformed in 1979, followed by mouse embryos in 1980. Most of the very first transmutations were performed by microinjection of DNA directly into cells. Scientists were able to develop other methods to perform the transformations, such as incorporating transgenes into retroviruses and then infecting cells; using electroinfusion, which takes advantage of an electric current to pass foreign DNA through the cell wall; biolistics, which is the procedure of shooting DNA bullets into cells; and also delivering DNA into the newly fertilized egg.

The first transgenic animals were only intended for genetic research to study the specific function of a gene, and by 2003, thousands of genes had been studied.

== Use in plants ==
A variety of transgenic plants have been designed for agriculture to produce genetically modified crops, such as corn, soybean, rapeseed oil, cotton, rice and more. As of 2012, these GMO crops were planted on 170 million hectares globally.

=== Golden rice ===
One example of a transgenic plant species is golden rice. In the late 20th century, an estimated five million children developed xerophthalmia, a medical condition caused by vitamin A deficiency, in Southeast Asia each year. Of those children, a quarter million went blind. To combat this, scientists used biolistics to insert the daffodil phytoene synthase gene into indigenous rice cultivars. The daffodil insertion increased the production of β-carotene. The product was a transgenic rice species rich in vitamin A, called golden rice. Little is known about the impact of golden rice on xerophthalmia because anti-GMO campaigns have prevented the full commercial release of golden rice into agricultural systems in need.

=== Transgene escape ===
The escape of genetically-engineered plant genes via hybridization with wild relatives was first discussed and examined in Mexico and Europe in the mid-1990s. There is agreement that escape of transgenes is inevitable, even "some proof that it is happening". Up until 2008 there were few documented cases.

==== Corn ====
Corn sampled in 2000 from the Sierra Juarez, Oaxaca, Mexico contained a transgenic 35S promoter, while a large sample taken by a different method from the same region in 2003 and 2004 did not. A sample from another region from 2002 also did not, but directed samples taken in 2004 did, suggesting transgene persistence or re-introduction. A 2009 study found recombinant proteins in 3.1% and 1.8% of samples, most commonly in southeast Mexico. Seed and grain import from the United States could explain the frequency and distribution of transgenes in west-central Mexico, but not in the southeast. Also, 5.0% of corn seed lots in Mexican corn stocks expressed recombinant proteins despite the moratorium on GM crops.

==== Cotton ====
In 2011, transgenic cotton was found in Mexico among wild cotton, after 15 years of GMO cotton cultivation.

==== Rapeseed (canola) ====
Transgenic rapeseed Brassicus napus – hybridized with a native Japanese species, Brassica rapa – was found in Japan in 2011 after having been rectified with in 2006 in Québec, Canada. They were persistent over a six-year study period, without herbicide selection pressure and despite hybridization with the wild form. This was the first report of the introgression—the stable incorporation of genes from one gene pool into another—of an herbicide transgene from Brassica napus into the wild form gene pool.

==== Creeping bentgrass ====
Transgenic creeping bentgrass, engineered to be glyphosate-tolerant as "one of the first wind-pollinated, perennial, and highly outcrossing transgenic crops", was planted in 2003 as part of a large (about 160 ha) field trial in central Oregon near Madras, Oregon. In 2004, its pollen was found to have reached wild growing bentgrass populations up to 14 kilometres away. Cross-pollinating Agrostis gigantea was even found at a distance of 21 kilometres. The grower, Scotts Company could not remove all genetically engineered plants, and in 2007, the U.S. Department of Agriculture fined Scotts $500,000 for noncompliance with regulations.

==== Risk assessment ====
The long-term monitoring and controlling of a particular transgene has been shown not to be feasible. The European Food Safety Authority published a guidance for risk assessment in 2010.

== Use in mice ==
Genetically modified mice are the most common animal model for transgenic research. Transgenic mouse are currently being used to study a variety of diseases including cancer, obesity, heart disease, arthritis, anxiety, and Parkinson's disease. The two most common types of genetically modified mice are knockout mice and oncomice. Knockout mice are a type of mouse model that uses transgenic insertion to disrupt an existing gene's expression. In order to create knockout mice, a transgene with the desired sequence is inserted into an isolated mouse blastocyst using electroporation. Then, homologous recombination occurs naturally within some cells, replacing the gene of interest with the designed transgene. Through this process, researchers were able to demonstrate that a transgene can be integrated into the genome of an animal, serve a specific function within the cell, and be passed down to future generations.

Oncomice are another genetically modified mouse species created by inserting transgenes that increase the animal's vulnerability to cancer. Cancer researchers utilize oncomice to study the profiles of different cancers in order to apply this knowledge to human studies.

== Use in Drosophila ==
Multiple studies have been conducted concerning transgenesis in Drosophila melanogaster, the fruit fly. This organism has been a helpful genetic model for over 100 years, due to its well-understood developmental pattern. The transfer of transgenes into the Drosophila genome has been performed using various techniques, including P element, Cre-loxP, and ΦC31 insertion. The most practiced method used thus far to insert transgenes into the Drosophila genome utilizes P elements. The transposable P elements, also known as transposons, are segments of bacterial DNA that are translocated into the genome, without the presence of a complementary sequence in the host's genome. P elements are administered in pairs of two, which flank the DNA insertion region of interest. Additionally, P elements often consist of two plasmid components, one known as the P element transposase and the other, the P transposon backbone. The transposase plasmid portion drives the transposition of the P transposon backbone, containing the transgene of interest and often a marker, between the two terminal sites of the transposon. Success of this insertion results in the nonreversible addition of the transgene of interest into the genome. While this method has been proven effective, the insertion sites of the P elements are often uncontrollable, resulting in an unfavorable, random insertion of the transgene into the Drosophila genome.

To improve the location and precision of the transgenic process, an enzyme known as Cre has been introduced. Cre has proven to be a key element in a process known as recombinase-mediated cassette exchange (RMCE). While it has shown to have a lower efficiency of transgenic transformation than the P element transposases, Cre greatly lessens the labor-intensive abundance of balancing random P insertions. Cre aids in the targeted transgenesis of the DNA gene segment of interest, as it supports the mapping of the transgene insertion sites, known as loxP sites. These sites, unlike P elements, can be specifically inserted to flank a chromosomal segment of interest, aiding in targeted transgenesis. The Cre transposase is important in the catalytic cleavage of the base pairs present at the carefully positioned loxP sites, permitting more specific insertions of the transgenic donor plasmid of interest.

To overcome the limitations and low yields that transposon-mediated and Cre-loxP transformation methods produce, the bacteriophage ΦC31 has recently been utilized. Recent breakthrough studies involve the microinjection of the bacteriophage ΦC31 integrase, which shows improved transgene insertion of large DNA fragments that are unable to be transposed by P elements alone. This method involves the recombination between an attachment (attP) site in the phage and an attachment site in the bacterial host genome (attB). Compared to usual P element transgene insertion methods, ΦC31 integrates the entire transgene vector, including bacterial sequences and antibiotic resistance genes. Unfortunately, the presence of these additional insertions has been found to affect the level and reproducibility of transgene expression.

== Use in livestock and aquaculture ==
One agricultural application is to selectively breed animals for particular traits: Transgenic cattle with an increased muscle phenotype has been produced by overexpressing a short hairpin RNA with homology to the myostatin mRNA using RNA interference. Transgenes are being used to produce milk with high levels of proteins or silk from the milk of goats. Another agricultural application is to selectively breed animals, which are resistant to diseases or animals for biopharmaceutical production.

== Future potential ==
The application of transgenes is a rapidly growing area of molecular biology. As of 2005 it was predicted that in the next two decades, 300,000 lines of transgenic mice will be generated. Researchers have identified many applications for transgenes, particularly in the medical field. Scientists are focusing on the use of transgenes to study the function of the human genome in order to better understand disease, adapting animal organs for transplantation into humans, and the production of pharmaceutical products such as insulin, growth hormone, and blood anti-clotting factors from the milk of transgenic cows.

As of 2004 there were five thousand known genetic diseases, and the potential to treat these diseases using transgenic animals is, perhaps, one of the most promising applications of transgenes. There is a potential to use human gene therapy to replace a mutated gene with an unmutated copy of a transgene in order to treat the genetic disorder. This can be done through the use of Cre-Lox or knockout. Moreover, genetic disorders are being studied through the use of transgenic mice, pigs, rabbits, and rats. Transgenic rabbits have been created to study inherited cardiac arrhythmias, as the rabbit heart markedly better resembles the human heart as compared to the mouse. More recently, scientists have also begun using transgenic goats to study genetic disorders related to fertility.

Transgenes may be used for xenotransplantation from pig organs. Through the study of xeno-organ rejection, it was found that an acute rejection of the transplanted organ occurs upon the organ's contact with blood from the recipient due to the recognition of foreign antibodies on endothelial cells of the transplanted organ. Scientists have identified the antigen in pigs that causes this reaction, and therefore are able to transplant the organ without immediate rejection by removal of the antigen. However, the antigen begins to be expressed later on, and rejection occurs. Therefore, further research is being conducted. Transgenic microorganisms capable of producing catalytic proteins or enzymes which increase the rate of industrial reactions.

== Ethical controversy ==
Transgene use in humans is currently fraught with issues. Transformation of genes into human cells has not been perfected yet. The most famous example of this involved certain patients developing T-cell leukemia after being treated for X-linked severe combined immunodeficiency (X-SCID). This was attributed to the close proximity of the inserted gene to the LMO2 promoter, which controls the transcription of the LMO2 proto-oncogene.

== See also ==
- Hybrid
- Fusion protein
- Gene pool
- Gene flow
- Introgression
- Nucleic acid hybridization
- Mouse models of breast cancer metastasis
