= Leibniz-Institute of Virology =

German research institute

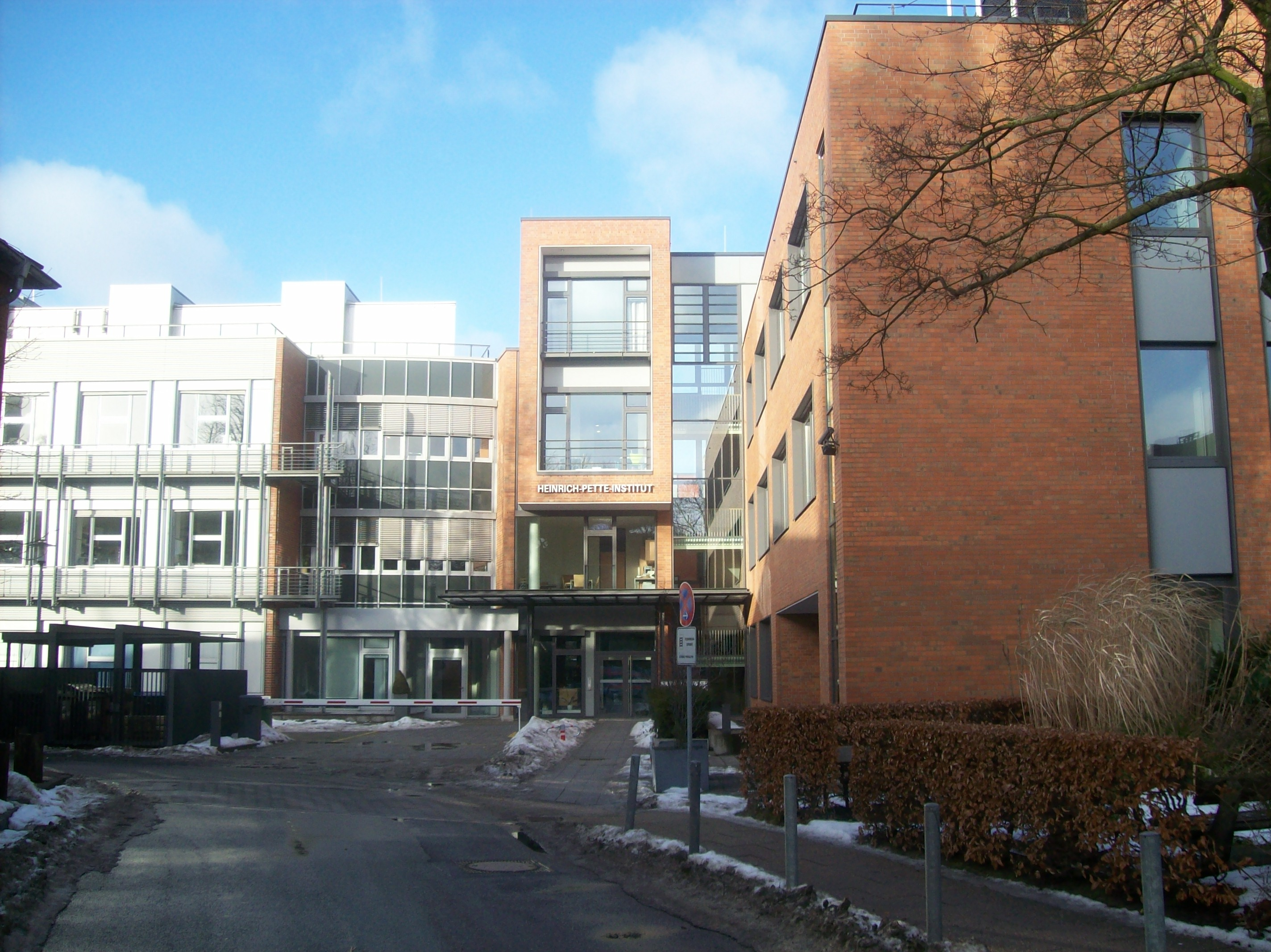
- Founded: 1948
- Coordinates: 53.5934°N 9.9732°E

The Leibniz Institute of Virology was founded in 1948 by Heinrich Pette, a German neurologist. It began as a research facility to create a polio vaccine. It is now a private foundation and involved with basic research in virology and the immune responses of organisms. The institute is a non-profit public beneficiary organisation and an independent member of the Leibniz Association, located in Hamburg.

Until 2021, the institute bore the name Heinrich Pette Institute, Leibniz Institute for Experimental Virology. Due to Heinrich Pette's activities in the year 1933–45, the Institute initially decided in 2021 to no longer use Pette's name as part of its institute name in the future. In May 2022, the institute was renamed Leibniz Institute of Virology.

== Research ==
The aim of the research at the LIV is to develop new approaches for improved diagnostic techniques and therapies for viral diseases and virus-associated tumor diseases. Scholars of the institute explore a wide range of viruses, such as hepatitis viruses (HPV, HCV), herpes viruses (herpes simplex type 1, herpes simplex type 2, Epstein-Barr virus, and Kaposi's sarcoma herpes virus), leukemia viruses (human T-cell leukemia virus-1, murine leukemia virus), coronaviruses, human immunodeficiency virus and DNA tumor viruses (adenoviruses, SV-40). The drive towards practical applications of the results in diagnosis and treatment is reflected in numerous collaborations with clinical institutions and industry.

== History ==
The foundation in 1948 as the "Foundation For The Research Of Spinal Polio" was made possible by two people: the generous patron Philipp Reemtsma Fürchtegott, and the neurologist Heinrich Pette. The latter shaped the scientific concept and development of the institute until his death in 1964. After his death the institute was renamed 'Heinrich Pette Institute for Experimental Virology and Immunology'. Since 1993 a cooperation agreement between the LIV and the University of Hamburg underlines the close relation to the university. The institute's buildings were renovated and extended in 1967, 1995 and in 2006. In May 2022, the institute was renamed Leibniz Institute of Virology.

== Networks ==
The LIV has collaborations on multiple levels with other research institutions. It is a member of the Gottfried Wilhelm Leibniz Scientific Community.

The institute is located on the campus of the University Medical Center Hamburg-Eppendorf, and is due to the cooperation agreement linked closely to the University of Hamburg. The heads of departments are C4 or W3 professors, appointed in a procedure closely coordinated with the departments of medicine, chemistry and biology at the University of Hamburg.

Alongside the Bernhard Nocht Institute for Tropical Medicine and the Research Center Borstel is a founding member of the Leibniz Center Infection, a strategic alliance to conduct research on highly relevant infectious diseases.

The research center for pediatric hematology and oncology 'Forschungsinstitut Kinderkrebs-Zentrum Hamburg' has a part of the LIV buildings. Based on the public-private partnership the society operates for the promotion of the replacement and expansion II of the LIV and is an independent research institute for pediatric hematology and oncology.

In cooperation with the Max Planck Institute for Molecular Cell Biology and Genetics in Dresden, scientists proved that it is possible, using a customized enzyme (Tre recombinase), to excise the DNA of the human immunodeficiency virus from the genome of individual cells to remove it. This demonstration is an important step in the development of a cure for AIDS (hence the extensive removal or containment of HIV infection).
