= Tre recombinase =

Tre recombinase is an experimental enzyme that in lab tests has removed DNA inserted by HIV from infected cells. Through selective mutation, Cre recombinase which recognizes loxP sites are modified to identify HIV long terminal repeats (loxLTR) instead. As a result, instead of performing Cre-Lox recombination, the new enzyme performs recombination at HIV provirus sites.

The structure of Tre in complex with loxLTR has been resolved (PDB: 5U91), allowing for analyzing the roles of individual mutations.
