= Recombinase =

Genetic recombination enzymes

Recombinases are genetic recombination enzymes.

== Site specific recombinases ==
DNA recombinases are widely used in multicellular organisms to manipulate the structure of genomes, and to control gene expression. These enzymes, derived from bacteria (bacteriophages) and fungi, catalyze directionally sensitive DNA exchange reactions between short (30–40 nucleotides) target site sequences that are specific to each recombinase. These reactions enable four basic functional modules: excision/insertion, inversion, translocation and cassette exchange, which have been used individually or combined in a wide range of configurations to control gene expression.

Types include:

- Cre recombinase
- Hin recombinase
- Tre recombinase
- FLP recombinase

== Homologous recombination ==
Recombinases have a central role in homologous recombination in a wide range of organisms. Such recombinases have been described in archaea, bacteria, eukaryotes and viruses.

=== Archaea ===
The archaeon Sulfolobus solfataricus RadA recombinase catalyzes DNA pairing and strand exchange, central steps in recombinational repair. The RadA recombinase has greater similarity to the eukaryotic Rad51 recombinase than to the bacterial RecA recombinase.

=== Bacteria ===
RecA recombinase appears to be universally present in bacteria. RecA has multiple functions, all related to DNA repair. RecA has a central role in the repair of replication forks stalled by DNA damage and in the bacterial sexual process of natural genetic transformation.

=== Eukaryotes ===
Eukaryotic Rad51 and its related family members are homologous to the archaeal RadA and bacterial RecA recombinases. Rad51 is highly conserved from yeast to humans. It has a key function in the recombinational repair of DNA damages, particularly double-strand damages such as double-strand breaks. In humans, over- or under-expression of Rad51 occurs in a wide variety of cancers.

During meiosis Rad51 interacts with another recombinase, Dmc1, to form a presynaptic filament that is an intermediate in homologous recombination. Dmc1 function appears to be limited to meiotic recombination. Like Rad51, Dmc1 is homologous to bacterial RecA.

=== Viruses ===
Some DNA viruses encode a recombinase that facilitates homologous recombination. A well-studied example is the UvsX recombinase encoded by bacteriophage T4. UvsX is homologous to bacterial RecA. UvsX, like RecA, can facilitate the assimilation of linear single-stranded DNA into an homologous DNA duplex to produce a D-loop.
