= Gene cassette =

Type of mobile genetic element

In biology, a gene cassette is a type of mobile genetic element that contains a gene and a recombination site. Each cassette usually contains a single gene and tends to be very small, containing approximately 500–1,000 base pairs. They may exist incorporated into an integron or freely as circular DNA. Gene cassettes can move around within an organism's genome or be transferred to another organism in the environment via horizontal gene transfer. These cassettes often carry antibiotic resistance genes. An example would be the kanMX cassette which confers kanamycin (an antibiotic) resistance upon bacteria.

== Integrons ==
Integrons are genetic structures in bacteria which express and are capable of acquiring and exchanging gene cassettes. The integron consists of a promoter, an attachment site, and an integrase gene that encodes a site-specific recombinase There are three classes of integrons described. The mobile units that insert into integrons are gene cassettes. For cassettes that carry a single gene without a promoter, the entire series of cassettes is transcribed from an adjacent promoter within the integron. The gene cassettes are speculated to be inserted and excised via a circular intermediate. This would involve recombination between short sequences found at their termini and known as 59 base elements (59-be)—which may not be 59 bases long. The 59-be are a diverse family of sequences that function as recognition sites for the site-specific integrase (enzyme responsible for integrating the gene cassette into an integron) that occur downstream from the gene coding sequence.

=== Diversity and prevalence ===
The ability of genetic elements like gene cassettes to excise and insert into genomes results in highly similar gene regions appearing in distantly related organisms. The three classes of integrons are similar in structure and are identified by where the insertions occur and what systems they coincide with. Class 1 integrons are seen in a diverse group of bacterial genomes and likely are all descendant from one common ancestor. The prevalence of the integron has shaped bacterial evolution by allowing rapid transfer of genes that are novel to an organism, such as antibiotic resistance genes.

== Genetic engineering ==
In genetic engineering, a gene cassette is a manipulable fragment of DNA carrying, and capable of expressing, one or more genes of interest between one or more sets of restriction sites. It can be transferred from one DNA sequence (usually on a vector) to another by 'cutting' the fragment out using restriction enzymes and 'pasting' it back into the new context. The vectors containing the gene of interest typically also carry an antibiotic resistance gene called a selectable marker to easily identify cells that have successfully integrated the vector into their genome.

To introduce a vector into a target cell, a state of competence must be inferred on the cell. This state is induced in the lab by incubating cells with calcium chloride before a brief heat shock, or by electroporation. This makes the cells more susceptible to the plasmid that is being inserted. Once the plasmid has been added, the cells are grown in the presence of an antibiotic to confirm the uptake and expression of the new genetic elements.

The usage of CRISPR/Cas9 systems has shown success in inserting genes into eukaryotic genomes. While CRISPR modification is still in its infancy, there is significant evidence for usage in combination with other techniques to produce high throughput (HTP) genome editing systems. Genetic engineering of bacteria for production of a variety of industrial products, including biofuels and specialty chemicals/nutraceuticals is a major area of research.

== Horizontal gene transfer ==
Horizontal gene transfer (HGT) is the transfer of genetic elements between cells other than parental inheritance. HGT is responsible for much of the spread of antibiotic resistance among bacteria. Gene cassettes containing antibiotic resistance genes, or other virulence factors such as exotoxins, can be transferred from cell to cell via phage, transduction, taken up from the environment, transformation, or by bacterial conjugation. The ability to transfer gene cassettes between organisms has played a large role in the evolution of prokaryotes. Many commensal organisms, such as E. coli, regularly harbor one or more gene cassettes that convey antibiotic resistance. Horizontal transfer of genetic elements from non-pathogenic commensals to unrelated species results in highly virulent pathogens that can carry multiple antibiotic resistance genes. The increasing prevalence of resistance creates challenging questions for researchers and physicians.

== See also ==
- Expression cassette
