= FLP-FRT recombination =

Site-directed recombination technology

Site-specific recombinase Flp

Identifiers
- Organism: Saccharomyces cerevisiae
- Symbol: FLP1
- Orthologs: OMA: entry
- UniProt: P03870
Search for
- Structures: Swiss-model
- Domains: InterPro

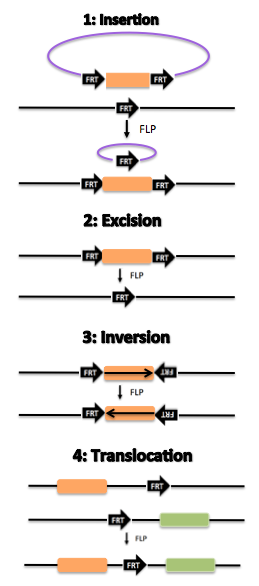

In genetics, Flp-FRT recombination is a site-directed recombination technology, increasingly used to manipulate an organism's DNA under controlled conditions in vivo. It is analogous to Cre-lox recombination but involves the recombination of sequences between short flippase recognition target (FRT) sites by the recombinase flippase (Flp) derived from the 2 μ plasmid of baker's yeast Saccharomyces cerevisiae.

The 34bp minimal FRT site sequence has the sequence

^{5'}GAAGTTCCTATTCtctagaaaGAATAGGAACTTC^{3'}

for which flippase (Flp) binds to both 13-bp 5'-GAAGTTCCTATTC-3' arms flanking the 8 bp spacer, i.e. the site-specific recombination (region of crossover) in reverse orientation. FRT-mediated cleavage occurs just ahead from the asymmetric 8bp core region (^{5'}tctagaaa^{3'}) on the top strand and behind this sequence on the bottom strand. Several variant FRT sites exist, but recombination can usually occur only between two identical FRTs but generally not among non-identical ("heterospecific") FRTs.

== Biological function ==
In yeast, this enzyme corrects decreases in 2 μ plasmid copy number caused by rare missegregation events. It does so by causing recombination between the two inverted repetitions on the 2 μ plasmid during DNA replication. This changes the direction of one replication fork, causing multiple rounds of copying in a single initiation.

== Mutations of the FRT site sequence ==
Senecoff et al. (1987) investigated how nucleotide substitutions within the FRT affected the efficacy of the FLP-mediated recombination. The authors induced base substitutions in either one or both of the FRT sites and tested the concentration of FLP required to observe site-specific recombinations. Every base substitution was performed on each of the thirteen nucleotides within the FRT site (example G to A, T, and C). First, the authors showed that most mutations within the FRT sequence cause minimal effects if present within only one of the two sites. If mutations occurred within both sites, the efficiency of FLP is dramatically reduced. Second, the authors provided data for which nucleotides are most crucial for the binding of FLP and efficacy of the site-specific recombination. If the first nucleotide in both FRT sites is substituted to a cytosine (G to C), the third nucleotide is substituted for a thymine (A to T), or the seventh nucleotide is substituted for an adenosine (G to A), then the efficacy of the FLP-mediated site-specific recombination is reduced more than 100-fold. While a base substitution of any of the aforementioned nucleotides in only one of the FRT sites led to a ten-fold, ten-fold, and five-fold reduction of efficacy, respectively.

Base Substitutions in the capitalized nucleotides led to the greatest reduction in FLP-mediated site-specific recombination (Wildtype x mutant and mutant x mutant):

^{5'}GaAtagGaacttc^{3'}

Many available constructs include an additional arm sequences (5'-GAAGTTCCTATTCC-3') one base pair away from the upstream element and in the same orientation:

^{5'}GAAGTTCCTATTCcGAAGTTCCTATTCtctagaaaGtATAGGAACTTC^{3'}

This segment is dispensable for excision but essential for integration, including Recombinase-mediated cassette exchange.

Because the recombination activity can be targeted to a selected organ, or a low level of recombination activity can be used to consistently alter the DNA of only a subset of cells, Flp-FRT can be used to construct genetic mosaics in multicellular organisms. Using this technology, the loss or alteration of a gene can be studied in a given target organ of interest, even in cases where experimental animals would not survive the loss of this gene in other organs (spatial control). The effect of altering a gene can also be studied over time, by using an inducible promoter to trigger the recombination activity late in development (temporal control) - this prevents the alteration.

== Biochemical structure of Flp and mechanism of action ==
=== Biochemically relevant structure and active site ===
The Flp protein, much like Cre, is a tyrosine family site-specific recombinase. This family of recombinases performs its function via a type IB topoisomerase mechanism causing the recombination of two separate strands of DNA. Recombination is carried out by a repeated two-step process. The initial step causes the creation of a Holliday junction intermediate. The second step promotes the resulting recombination of the two complementary strands. As their family name suggests, a highly conserved tyrosine nucleophile cleaves the DNA strands. The nucleophilic properties of the tyrosine attack and bind to the 3'-phosphate at the point of DNA cleavage. The resulting 5'-hydroxyl group of the cleaved DNA acts as the nucleophile and attacks the 3'-phosphate on the complementarily cleaved DNA strand, resulting in successful recombination. Outside of the tyrosine residue, there is a conserved catalytic pentad. This pentad is made up of a lysine (Lysβ), two arginines (Arg I and II), a histidine (His-II), and a histidine/tryptophan (His/Trp-III) that comprises a mandatory and highly conserved constellation of residues for the active site of Flp and Cre (along with other IB topoisomerases). These other residues are crucial to the correct orientation of Flp binding and positioning on the DNA strands.

== Application of FLP-mediated site-specific recombination ==
=== Initial problems ===
==== Thermolability ====
Initial application of the FLP-FRT recombinase did not work in mammals. The FLP protein was thermolabile (denatured at elevated temperatures) and therefore was not useful in the mammalian model due to elevated body temperatures of these model systems. However, due to patents and restrictions on the use of Cre-Lox recombination, great interest was taken to produce a more thermostable FLP-FRT cassette. Some of the first results were produced by Buchholz et al. (1997) by utilizing cycling mutagenesis in Escherichia coli . In their research, the authors transfected E. coli cells with two plasmids: one coding for randomly mutated FLP proteins downstream of an arabinose promoter and another containing a lacZ gene promoter within a FRT cassette. The E. coli were grown on arabinose plates at 37 °C and 40 °C, and if recombination occurred, the lacZ expression would be attenuated, and the colonies would appear white. White colonies were selected from each generation and grown on a new arabinose plates at same previous temperatures for eight generations. After recombination was confirmed by western-blotting and the mutated FLP genes were sequenced, this eighth generation FLP protein (FLPe) was transfected into mammalian cell culture, and recombination in mammalian cells was confirmed. This variant of FLP only has 4 amino acid substitutions: P2S, L33S, Y108N, and S294P.

=== Generation of genetic mosaics ===
Genetic mosaicism occurs within an organism when similar cell types express different phenotypes due to dissimilar genotypes at specific loci. Simply put, this occurs when one organism contains different genotypes, which is usually rare in nature. However, this can be easily (and problematically) produced using FLP-FRT recombination. If two different FRT sites are present within a cell, and FLP is present in appropriate concentrations, the FRT cassette will continue to be excised and inserted between the two FRT sites. This process will continue until the FLP proteins fall below the required concentrations resulting in cells within an organism possessing different genotypes. This has been seen from fruit flies to mice and is indiscriminate against specific chromosomes (somatic and sex) or cell types (somatic and germline).

=== Determination of cell lineages ===
Before the publication of Dymecki et al.. (1998), Cre recombinase had been used for cell-fate mapping of neuronal progenitors in mice using the En2 promoter. Thus, the authors of Dymecki et al.. (1998) theorized that FLP recombinase could be utilized in a similar fashion with a similar efficacy as Cre recombinase in mice. The authors created a two transgenic mouse lines: a neuronal Wnt1::Flp fusion line and a line that possessed the FRT cassette flanking the 18th exon of tm1Cwr. The authors chose this exon for excision because if it is excised, its results in a null phenotype. The authors mated the two lines and allowed the progeny to reach adulthood before the progeny were sacrificed. RNA extraction was performed on neuronal, muscular, enteric, and tail tissue. Reverse-transcription PCR and northern blotting confirmed the excision of the 18th exon of tm1Cwr abundantly in the brain tissue and moderately in muscular tissue (due to Scwhann cells within the muscle). As expected, excision was not seen in other tissues. The authors saw equal, if not better, efficiency of the FLP recombinase in cell-fate determination than Cre recombinase.

=== In Drosophila melanogaster (Fruit Fly) ===
To date, Flp recombinase has been utilized many times in D. melanogaster. A comparison of Flp recombinase to Cre recombinase in D. melanogaster was published by Frickenhaus et al. (2015). The authors of Frickenhaus et al. (2015) had a two-fold objective: characterize and compare the efficacy of Flp recombinase "knock-out" to Cre recombinase "knock-out" and RNAi knockdown and reveal the function of cabeza (caz), the fly ortholog to FUS, in the neurons and muscle tissue of D. melanogaster. FUS has been strongly implicated in amyotrophic lateral sclerosis (ALS) and frontotemporal dementia in humans . The authors used an elav-Gal4/UAS-Flp or Cre system to express the recombinase specifically in neurons and a Mef2-Gal4/UAS-Flp or Cre system to express it specifically in muscles. The authors conclude that the Flp recombinase "knock-out" tool is more effective than both RNAi and Cre recombinase for the purpose of knocking out specific genes in specific tissues or cell lines due to the lack of the leaky expression seen in both the Cre protein and the RNAi transcript. Also, the authors witnessed a toxicity to the Cre protein that is not seen with the Flp protein.

=== In Danio rerio (Zebrafish) ===
The efficacy of the FLPe recombinase system was evaluated in zebrafish by Wong et al.. (2009). Embryos, that were hemizygous for a FRT-flanked enhanced green fluorescent protein (EGFP) downstream of a muscle-specific promoter, were injected with the FLPe protein. Without FLPe, these embryos should express EGFP in all muscle tissue, and if crossed with a wild type strand, 50% of the resulting progeny should also express EGFP in muscle tissue. Embryos, injected with FLPe, had significantly reduced expression of EGFP in muscle tissue, and mosaicism was seen also. When these embryos reached adulthood, they were mated with a wild type strain, and the resulting clutches had significantly less progeny that expressed the EGFP in the muscle tissue (0-4%). These results show, that not only is FLPe highly effective in somatic cells, it is also highly effective in the germline of zebrafish.

=== In plants ===
==== Creation of "phytosensors" or "sentinels" in Arabidopsis thaliana and Tobacco ====
Phytosensors are genetically modified plants that can report the presence of biotic or abiotic contaminants. The production of these engineered plants have great agricultural and laboratory promise. However, creating an appropriate reporter vector has shown to be problematic. cis-regulatory elements play a major role in the transcriptional activation of genes in plants, and many are not well understood. Many phytosensors either under express their reporter genes or report false-positives due to synthetic promoters. The authors of Rao et al. (2010) utilized the FLP recombinase tool for the production of a highly efficient phytosensors. The authors used a heat shock promoter to induce the production of FLP while a FRT-flanked vector separated the CaMV 35S promoter from the beta-glucuronidase gene (GUS). When the plants were exposed to heat-shock, FLP-induction led to the excision of the FRT-flanked vector, effectively moving the GUS gene directly downstream of the CaMV 35S promoter. The activation of GUS led to the leaves of the plants to change from green to blue; thus, the phytosensor effectively reported stress to the model system!

=== With Cre-recombinase ===
==== Production of the gate-way-ready inducible MiRNA (GRIM) expression system ====
RNA interference (RNAi) has caused a paradigm shift in the expression of genes and potential gene knockouts in Eukaryotes. Before the production of the GRIM expression system, the creation of RNAi vectors was expensive and time-consuming. The vectors were produced by the traditional copy-and-paste molecular cloning method. Garwick-Coppens et al.. (2011) developed a much more efficient method for the production of RNAi vectors in which expression of the RNAi can be knocked-in using Cre-recombinase and knocked-out using Flp-recombinase. The novel GRIM Expression System allows for the much faster generation of expression vectors containing artificial RNAi constructs. The authors went on to show that their expression system works quite effectively in human embryonic kidneys (HEK) cells, a common human immortalized cell line in molecular research.

== See also ==
- Site-specific recombinase technology
- Recombinase-mediated cassette exchange
- Cre recombinase
- Cre-Lox recombination
- Genetic recombination
- Homologous recombination
