= Cre recombinase =

Genetic recombination enzyme

- Structure of a Cre recombinase enzyme (dimer) bound to its substrate DNA

Identifiers
- Organism: Enterobacteria phage P1
- Symbol: cre
- Entrez: 2777477
- Orthologs: NCBI: entry; OMA: entry
- RefSeq (Prot): YP_006472.1
- UniProt: P06956

Other data
- EC number: 2.7.7.-
- Chromosome: genome: 0 - 0 Mb
Search for
- Structures: Swiss-model
- Domains: InterPro

Cre recombinase is a tyrosine recombinase enzyme derived from the P1 bacteriophage. The enzyme uses a topoisomerase I-like mechanism to carry out site specific recombination events. The enzyme (38 kDa) is a member of the integrase family of site specific recombinase and it is known to catalyse the site specific recombination event between two DNA recognition sites (LoxP sites). This 34 base pair (bp) loxP recognition site consists of two 13 bp palindromic sequences which flank an 8bp spacer region. The products of Cre-mediated recombination at loxP sites are dependent upon the location and relative orientation of the loxP sites. Two separate DNA species both containing loxP sites can undergo fusion as the result of Cre mediated recombination. DNA sequences found between two loxP sites are said to be "floxed". In this case the products of Cre mediated recombination depends upon the orientation of the loxP sites. DNA found between two loxP sites oriented in the same direction will be excised as a circular loop of DNA whilst intervening DNA between two loxP sites that are opposingly orientated will be inverted. The enzyme requires no additional cofactors (such as ATP) or accessory proteins for its function.

The enzyme plays important roles in the life cycle of the P1 bacteriophage, such as cyclization of the linear genome and resolution of dimeric chromosomes that form after DNA replication.

Cre recombinase is a widely used tool in the field of molecular biology and particularly for brain research. The enzyme's unique and specific recombination system is exploited to manipulate genes and chromosomes in a huge range of research, such as gene knock out or knock in studies. The enzyme's ability to operate efficiently in a wide range of cellular environments (including mammals, plants, bacteria, and yeast) enables the Cre-Lox recombination system to be used in a vast number of organisms, making it a particularly useful tool in scientific research.

== Discovery ==
Studies carried out in 1981 by Sternberg and Hamilton demonstrated that the bacteriophage 'P1' had a unique site specific recombination system. EcoRI fragments of the P1 bacteriophage genome were generated and cloned into lambda vectors. A 6.5kb EcoRI fragment (Fragment 7) was found to permit efficient recombination events. The mechanism of these recombination events was known to be unique as they occurred in the absence of bacterial RecA and RecBCD proteins. The components of this recombination system were elucidated using deletion mutagenesis studies. These studies showed that a P1 gene product and a recombination site were both required for efficient recombination events to occur. The P1 gene product was named Cre (cyclization recombination) and the recombination site was named loxP (locus of crossing (x) over, P1). The Cre protein was purified in 1983 and was found to be a 35,000 Da protein. No high energy cofactors such as ATP or accessory proteins are required for the recombinase activity of the purified protein. Early studies also demonstrated that Cre binds to non specific DNA sequences whilst having a 20 fold higher affinity for loxP sequences and results of early DNA footprinting studies also suggested that Cre molecules bind loxP sites as dimers.

Tyrosine recombinase family members
S.cerevisiae Flp recombinase
Bacterial XerC recombinase
Bacterial XerD recombinase
λ integrase protein
HP1 integrase protein

== Structure ==
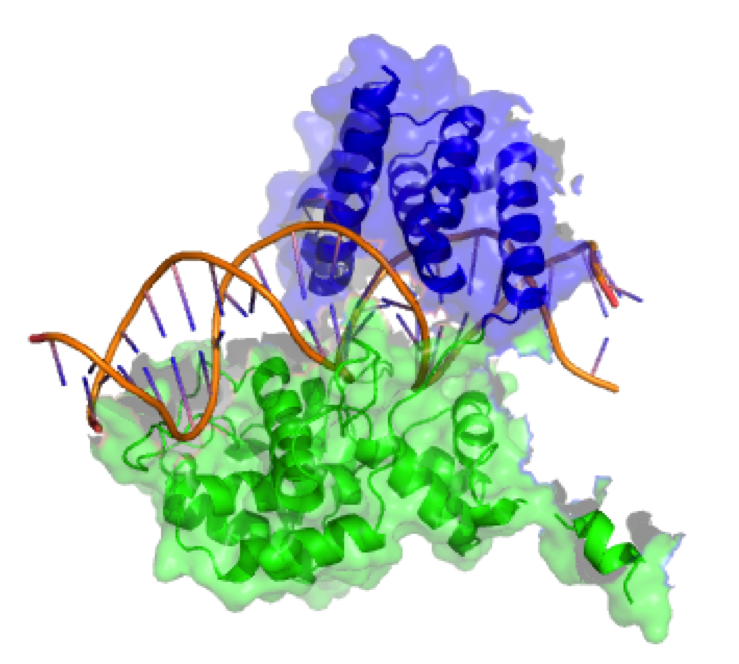
90° rotation separated views of a single protomer in a Cre recombinase-DNA complex (1CRX). The N-terminal domain is shown in blue, the C-terminal domain is coloured green.

Cre recombinase consists of 343 amino acids that form two distinct domains. The N-terminal domain encompasses residues 20–129 and this domain contains 5 alpha helical segments linked by a series of short loops. Helices A & E are involved in the formation of the recombinase tetramer with the C-terminus region of helix E known to form contacts with the C-terminal domain of adjacent subunits. Helices B & D form direct contacts with the major groove of the loxP DNA. These two helices are thought to make three direct contacts to DNA bases at the loxP site. The C-terminal domain of the enzyme consists of amino acids 132–341 and it harbours the active site of the enzyme. The overall structure of this domain shares structural similarity to other enzymes in the same protein family such as λ integrase and HP1 integrase. This domain has 9 distinct helices. The C-terminal helix protrudes from the main body of the C-terminal domain burying into a pocket in an adjacent Cre subunit. The effect of the two-domain structure is to form a C-shaped clamp that grasps the DNA from opposite sides.

=== Active site ===
Cre recombinase bound to cleaved substrate DNA. Active site residues, Arg173, His289, Arg292, Tyr324 and Trp315, are highlighted in red.

The active site of the Cre enzyme consists of conserved amino acids arginine (Arg173, Arg292), histidine (His289), tyrosine (Tyr324) and tryptophan (Trp315). Unlike other recombinase enzymes such as Flp recombinase, the Cre active site is contained within a single protomer subunit. Cre recombination proceeds through the formation of a junction between two Cre-loxP complexes, known as the synapse tetramer. Tyr324 acts as a nucleophile to form a covalent 3′-phosphotyrosine linkage to the DNA substrate. This phosphate is coordinated by the side chains of the Arg173, His289 and Trp315. This reaction cleaves the DNA backbone, freeing a 5′-hydroxyl group. This process occurs in the active site of two out of the four recombinase subunits present at the synapse tetramer. If the 5′-hydroxyl groups attack the 3′-phosphotyrosine linkage in the Cre subunits one pair of the DNA strands will exchange to form a Holliday junction intermediate.

== Applications ==
=== Role in bacteriophage P1 ===
Cre recombinase plays important roles in the life cycle of the P1 bacteriophage. Upon infection of a cell the Cre-loxP system is used to cause circularization of the P1 DNA. In addition to this Cre is also used to resolve dimeric lysogenic P1 DNA that forms during the cell division of the phage.

=== Use in research ===
Inducible Cre activation is achieved using CreER (estrogen receptor) variant, which is only activated after delivery of tamoxifen. This is done through the fusion of a mutated ligand binding domain of the estrogen receptor to the Cre recombinase, resulting in Cre becoming specifically activated by tamoxifen. In the absence of tamoxifen, CreER will result in the shuttling of the mutated recombinase into the cytoplasm. The protein will stay in this location in its inactivated state until tamoxifen is given. Once tamoxifen is introduced, it is metabolized into 4-hydroxytamoxifen, which then binds to the ER and results in the translocation of the CreER into the nucleus, where it is then able to cleave the lox sites. Importantly, sometimes fluorescent reporters can be activated in the absence of tamoxifen, due to leakage of a few Cre recombinase molecules into the nucleus which, in combination with very sensitive reporters, results in unintended cell labelling. CreER(T2) was developed to minimize tamoxifen-independent recombination and maximize tamoxifen-sensitivity.

== Improvements ==
In recent years, Cre recombinase has been improved with conversion to preferred mammalian codons, the removal of reported cryptic splice sites, an altered stop codon, and reduced CpG content to reduce the risk of epigenetic silencing in mammals. A number of mutants with enhanced accuracy have also been identified.

== See also ==
- Cre-Lox recombination
- FLP-FRT recombination
- Cre/loxP-System (in German)
