= List of model organisms =

Escherichia coli is a gram-negative prokaryotic model organism

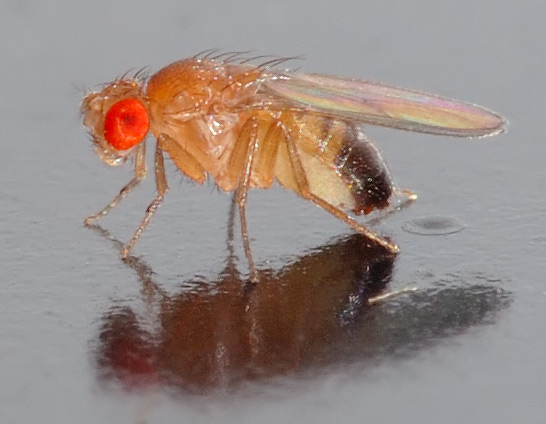
Drosophila melanogaster, one of the most famous subjects for experiments

This is a list of model organisms used in scientific research.

== Viruses ==
Phages (infecting prokaryotes):

- Escherichia virus Lambda (Phage lambda)
- Phi X 174, the first DNA genome ever to be sequenced (circular, 5386 base pairs in length), shortly after the RNA genome of bacteriophage MS2 (in 1976).
- T4 phage

Animal viruses:

- SV40
- Human alphaherpesvirus (Herpes simplex virus)

Plant viruses:

- Tobacco mosaic virus

== Bacteria ==
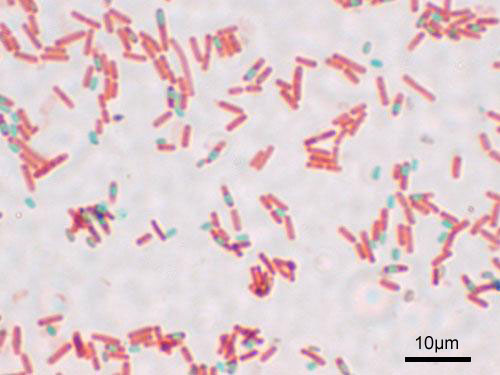
Sporulating Bacillus subtilis

- Escherichia coli (E. coli), common Gram-negative gut bacterium widely used in molecular genetics. Main lab strain is 'K-12'.
- Bacillus subtilis, endospore forming Gram-positive bacterium. Main lab strain is '168'.
- Caulobacter crescentus, bacterium that divides into two distinct cells used to study cellular differentiation.
- Mycoplasma genitalium, minimal organism and human STD pathogen.
- Aliivibrio fischeri, quorum sensing, bioluminescence and animal-bacterial symbiosis with Hawaiian bobtail squid.
- Bacteroides thetaiotaomicron, polysaccharide-degrading member of the human gut microbiota, used to study functional aspects of the gut microbiota.
- Synechocystis (specifically PCC 6803), photosynthetic cyanobacterium widely used in photosynthesis research.
- Pseudomonas fluorescens, soil bacterium that readily diversifies into different strains in the lab.
- Azotobacter vinelandii, obligate aerobe diazotroph used in nitrogen fixation research.
- Streptomyces coelicolor, soil-dwelling filamentous bacterium used to produce many clinically useful antibiotics.

=== Bacteria with minimal synthetic genomes ===
Bacteria with synthetic, minimized genomes provide a near-"blank slate" for study. Foreign genes, natural or artificial, can be introduced into these minimal bacteria to study their function as well as what is needed for their function.

- "Mycoplasma laboratorium", a series of minimized Mycoplasma mycoides strains. Syn3B has been used to research the interaction between Mycoplasma and mammal cells, specifically what genes are needed for intracellular parasitism.
- Escherichia coli Syn61, a minimized version of E. coli with three unused codons. Has been used to research expanded genetic code.
- Escherichia coli Syn57, a further minimization with seven unused codons.

== Archaea ==
- Methanococcus and Methanosarcina, model methanogens, representing the two metabolic types of hydrogenotrophism and methylotrophism. Methanogenesis remains a key area of metabolic research.
- Halobacterium salinarum and Haloferax volcanii, model Haloarchaea. The former has a reputation in the study of DNA repair. The latter is more suited to more traditional genetics due to a shorter generation time and more stable genome. This order is known for its easy updake of genetic tools as well as resistance to culture contamination.
- Thermococcus kodakarensis, Pyrococcus abyssi, and Pyrococcus furiosus are the Thermococcales models. This order is known for its unique metabolic pathways.
- Three members of Sulfolobus, S. solfataricus PBL2025, S. islandicus E322S, and S. acidocaldarius are the current Sulfolobales models. Proteins from these thermophilic bacteria are easy to crystalize, simplifying structural work.

== Eukaryotes ==
=== Protists ===
- Stentor coeruleus, used in molecular biology (its genome has been sequenced), and is studied as a model of single-cell regeneration.
- Dictyostelium discoideum, used in molecular biology and genetics (its genome has been sequenced), and is studied as an example of cell communication, differentiation, and programmed cell death.
- Tetrahymena thermophila, free living freshwater ciliate protozoan.
- Naegleria gruberi, freshwater non-pathogenic amoeboflagellate sometimes used in eukaryotic cell biology experiments.
- Emiliania huxleyi, unicellular marine coccolithophore alga, extensively studied as a model phytoplankton species.
- Thalassiosira pseudonana, unicellular marine diatom alga, extensively studied as a model marine diatom since its genome was published in 2004.

=== Fungi ===
- Ashbya gossypii, cotton pathogen, subject of genetics studies (polarity, cell cycle).
- Aspergillus nidulans, mold subject of genetics studies.
- Coprinus cinereus, mushroom (genetic studies of mushroom development, genetic studies of meiosis).
- Cryptococcus neoformans, opportunistic human pathogen
- Neurospora crassa, orange bread mold (genetic studies of meiosis, metabolic regulation, and circadian rhythm).
- Pichia pastoris (Komagataella phaffii), widely used in biochemical research and industry as an expression system for protein production, as well as genetic study
- Rhizophagus irregularis, used for studying arbuscular mycorrhizal symbiosis.
- Saccharomyces cerevisiae (baker's yeast or budding yeast), used in brewing and baking.
- Schizophyllum commune, model for mushroom formation.
- Schizosaccharomyces pombe, fission yeast, (cell cycle, cell polarity, RNAi, centromere structure and function, transcription).
- Ustilago maydis, dimorphic yeast and plant pathogen of maize (dimorphism, plant pathogen, transcription).

=== Plants ===
==== Vascular plants ====
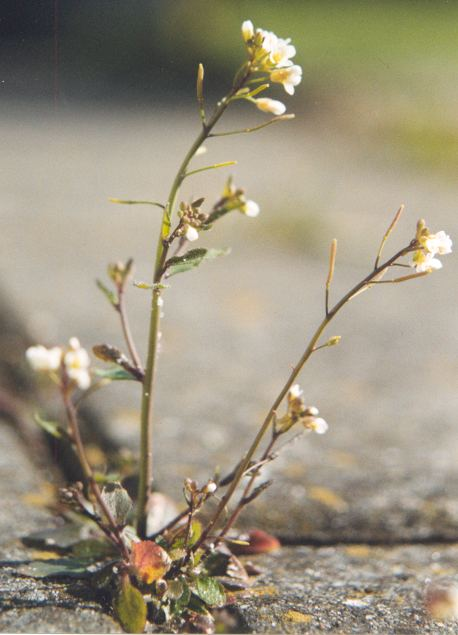
Arabidopsis thaliana

- Arabidopsis thaliana, currently the most popular model plant. This herbaceous dicot of the family Brassicaceae is closely related to the mustard plant. Its small stature and short generation time facilitates rapid genetic studies, and many phenotypic and biochemical mutants have been mapped. Arabidopsis was the first plant to have its genome sequenced. Its genome sequence, along with a wide range of information concerning Arabidopsis, is maintained by the TAIR database.
  (Plant physiology, Developmental biology, Molecular genetics, Population genetics, Cytology, Molecular biology)
- Boechera genus, combines some of the experimental tractability and genetic tools developed for its close relative Arabidopsis with a largely undisturbed natural history, making it a promising model system for research at the intersection of genetics, genomics, ecology, and evolution. The genus includes species with the rare trait of apomixis at the diploid level.
  (Evolutionary ecology, Population genetics, Molecular ecology, Evolutionary biology, Ecological genetics)
- Selaginella moellendorffii, remnant of an ancient lineage of vascular plants that is key to understanding the evolution of land plants. It has a small genome size (~110Mb) and its sequence was released by the Joint Genome Institute in early 2008. (Evolutionary biology, Molecular biology)
- Brachypodium distachyon, emerging experimental model grass that has many attributes that make it an excellent model for temperate cereals. (Agronomy, Molecular biology, Genetics)
- Setaria viridis, emerging model grass for C4 photosynthesis and related bioenergy grasses.
- Lotus japonicus, model legume used to study the symbiosis responsible for nitrogen fixation. (Agronomy, Molecular biology)

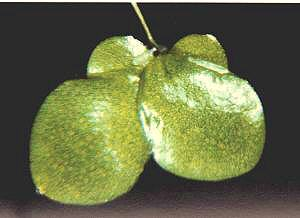
Lemna gibba

- Lemna gibba, rapidly growing aquatic monocot, one of the smallest flowering plants. Lemna growth assays are used to evaluate the toxicity of chemicals to plants in ecotoxicology. Because it can be grown in pure culture, microbial action can be excluded. Lemna is being used as a recombinant expression system for economical production of complex biopharmaceuticals. It is also used in education to demonstrate population growth curves.
- Zea mays L. (Maize/corn), cereal grain. It is a diploid monocot with 10 large chromosome pairs, easily studied with the microscope. Its genetic features, including many known and mapped phenotypic mutants and a large number of progeny per cross (typically 100–200) facilitated the discovery of transposons ("jumping genes"). Many DNA markers have been mapped and the genome has been sequenced. (Genetics, Molecular biology, Agronomy)
- Medicago truncatula, model legume, closely related to the common alfalfa. Its rather small genome is currently being sequenced. It is used to study the symbiosis responsible for nitrogen fixation. (Agronomy, Molecular biology)
- Mimulus guttatus, model organism used in evolutionary and functional genomes studies. The genus Mimulus contains c. 120 species and is in the family Phrymaceae. Several genetic resources have been designed for the study of this genus and some are free access (https://www.mimulusevolution.org)
- Nicotiana benthamiana, model organism for plant-pathogen studies.
- Nicotiana tabacum cv. BY-2 (Tobacco BY-2 cells), suspension cell line from tobacco (Nicotiana tabacum) that is useful for general plant physiology studies at the cell level. The genome of this particular cultivar will not be sequenced in the near future, but sequencing of its wild species Nicotiana tabacum is presently in progress. (Cytology, Plant physiology, Biotechnology)
- Oryza sativa (Rice) is used as a model for cereal biology. It has one of the smallest genomes of any cereal species, and sequencing of its genome is finished. (Agronomy, Molecular biology)

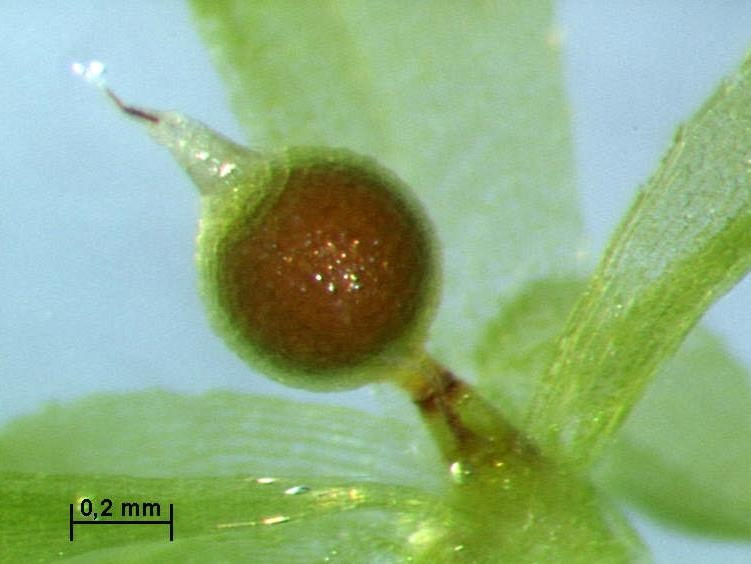
Physcomitrella patens

- Populus, genus used as a model in forest genetics and woody plant studies. It has a small genome size, grows very rapidly, and is easily transformed. The genome sequence of black cottonwood (Populus trichocarpa) is publicly available.

==== Other Archaeplastida ====
- Chlamydomonas reinhardtii, unicellular green alga used to study photosynthesis, flagella and motility, regulation of metabolism, cell–cell recognition and adhesion, response to nutrient deprivation and many other topics. Chlamydomonas reinhardtii has well-studied genetics, with many known and mapped mutants and expressed sequence tags, and there are advanced methods for genetic transformation and selection of genes. Sequencing of the Chlamydomonas reinhardtii genome was reported in October 2007. A Chlamydomonas genetic stock center exists at Duke University, and an international Chlamydomonas research interest group meets on a regular basis to discuss research results. Chlamydomonas is easy to grow on an inexpensive defined medium.
- Physcomitrella patens, moss increasingly used for studies on development and molecular evolution of plants. It is so far the only non-vascular plant(and so the only "primitive" plant) with its genome completely sequenced. Moreover, it is currently the only land plant with efficient gene targeting that enables gene knockout. The resulting knockout mosses are stored and distributed by the International Moss Stock Center. (Plant physiology, Evolutionary biology, Molecular genetics, Molecular biology)
- Marchantia polymorpha, liverwort that is also emerging as a model for plant biology and development.

=== Animals ===
==== Invertebrates ====
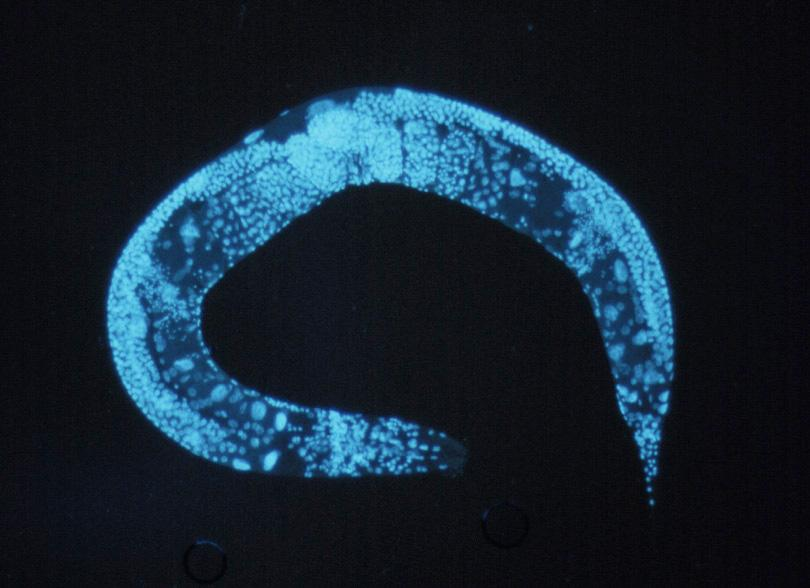
Caenorhabditis elegans

- Amphimedon queenslandica, a demosponge from the phylum Porifera used as a model for evolutionary developmental biology and comparative genomics
- Arbacia punctulata, the purple-spined sea urchin, classical subject of embryological studies
- Aplysia, a sea slug, whose ink release response serves as a model in neurobiology and whose growth cones serve as a model of cytoskeletal rearrangements
- Branchiostoma floridae, a species commonly known as amphioxus or lancelet from the subphylum Cephalochordata of the phylum Chordata used as a model for understanding the evolution of nonchordate deuterostomes, invertebrate chordates, and vertebrates
- Caenorhabditis elegans, a nematode, usually called C. elegans - an excellent model for understanding the genetic control of development and physiology. C.elegans has a fixed number of 1031 cells. C. elegans was the first multicellular organism whose genome was completely sequenced
- Callosobruchus maculatus, the bruchid beetle, used to study sexual selection and sexual conflict
- Chorthippus parallelus (the meadow grasshopper), used to study sexual selection and sexual conflict
- Ciona intestinalis, a sea squirt
- Daphnia spp., small planktonic crustaceans, highly sensitive to pollution, used for evaluating environmental toxicity of chemicals on aquatic invertebrates.
- Coelopidae, seaweed flies, used to study sexual selection and sexual conflict
- Diopsidae, stalk-eyed flies, used to study sexual selection and sexual conflict
- Drosophila, usually the species Drosophila melanogaster – a kind of fruit fly, famous as the subject of genetics experiments by Thomas Hunt Morgan and others. Easily raised in lab, rapid generations, mutations easily induced, many observable mutations. Recently, Drosophila has been used for neuropharmacological research. (Molecular genetics, Population genetics, Developmental biology).
- Euprymna scolopes (the Hawaiian bobtail squid), model for animal-bacterial symbiosis, bioluminescent vibrios
- Galleria mellonella (the greater wax moth), the larvae of which are an excellent model organism for in vivo toxicology and pathogenicity testing, replacing the use of small mammals in such experiments.
- Gryllus bimaculatus (the field cricket), used to study sexual selection and sexual conflict
- Hydra, a Cnidarian is the model organism to understand the processes of regeneration and morphogenesis, as well as the evolution of bilaterian body plans
- Loligo pealei, a squid is the subject of studies of nerve function because of its giant axon (nearly 1 mm diameter, roughly a thousand times larger than typical mammalian axons)
- Lymnaea stagnalis (great pond snail), a widely used model mollusc, for the study of biomineralization, neurobiology, eco-toxicology, sexual selection and body asymmetry
- Macrostomum lignano, a free-living, marine flatworm, a model organism for the study of stem cells, regeneration, ageing, gene function, and the evolution of sex. Easily raised in the lab, short generation time, indetermined growth, complex behaviour
- Manduca sexta (Tobacco hornworm), the large caterpillars are an excellent model organism for immunity and in vivo imaging, replacing mice and rats in such experiments.
- Mnemiopsis leidyi, from the phylum Ctenophora (comb jelly) used as a model for evolutionary developmental biology and comparative genomics
- Nematostella vectensis, a sea anemone from the phylum Cnidaria used as a model for evolutionary developmental biology and comparative genomics
- Oikopleura dioica, an appendicularian, a free-swimming tunicate (or urochordate)
- Ormia ochracea, a tachinid fly used to study sound localization.
- Oscarella carmela, a homoscleromorph sponge (phylum Porifera) used as a model in evolutionary developmental biology
- Parhyale hawaiensis an amphipod crustacean, used in evolutionary developmental (evo-devo) studies, with an extensive toolbox for genetic manipulation.
- Platynereis dumerilii a marine polychaetous annelid, which evolved very slowly and therefore retained many ancestral features.
- Podisma spp., in the Alps, used to study sexual selection and sexual conflict
- Pristionchus pacificus, a roundworm used in evolutionary developmental biology in comparative analyses with C. elegans
- Scaptomyza flava, herbivorous leaf miner fly nested in the Drosophila, and a close relative of D. melanogaster.
- Scathophaga stercoraria (the yellow dung fly), used to study sexual selection and sexual conflict
- Schmidtea mediterranea (freshwater planarian), a model for regeneration and development of tissues such as the brain and germline
- Solenopsis invicta (the red imported fire ant), the most-studied species of ant, used as a model organism for evolution of polyphenism and caste
- Stomatogastric ganglion, various arthropod species, and a model for motor pattern generation seen in all repetitive motions
- Strongylocentrotus purpuratus (the purple sea urchin), widely used in developmental biology
- Symsagittifera roscoffensis, a flatworm, subject of studies of bilaterian body plan development
- Tribolium castaneum (the flour beetle), small and easily kept darkling beetle used especially in behavioural ecology experiments
- Trichoplax adhaerens, simple free-living animal from the phylum Placozoa used as a model in evolutionary developmental biology and comparative genomics
- Tubifex tubifex, an oligochaeta used for evaluating environmental toxicity of chemicals on aquatic and terrestrial worms.

==== Vertebrates ====
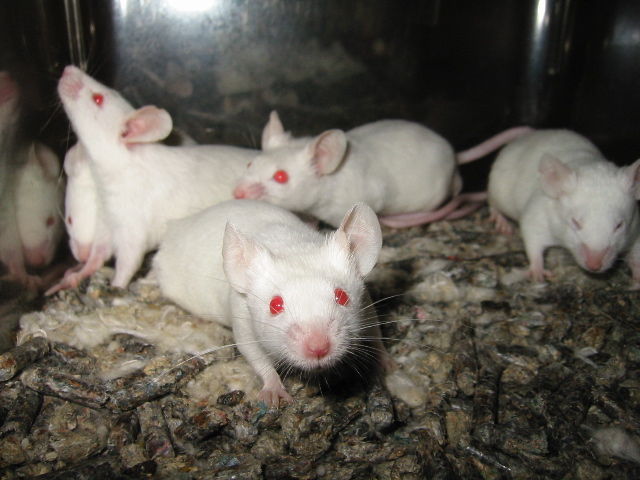
Laboratory mice

- Canis lupus familiaris (Dog), important respiratory and cardiovascular model, also contributed to the discovery of classical conditioning.
- Felis sylvestris catus (Cat), used in neurophysiological research.
- Mustela furo (Ferret), used as a model organism to study influenza A virus infection.
- Ambystoma mexicanum (Axolotl), used to study regeneration and developmental processes
- Bombina bombina and Bombina variegata, used to study sexual selection and sexual conflict
- Anolis carolinensis (Carolina anole), used to study reptile genomics
- Gallus gallus domesticus (Chicken), used for developmental studies, as it is an amniote and excellent for micromanipulation (e.g. tissue grafting) and over-expression of gene products.
- Sigmodon hispidus (Cotton rat), formerly used in polio research.
- Mesocricetus auratus (Golden hamster), first used to study kala-azar (leishmaniasis).
- Cavia porcellus (Guinea pig), used by Robert Koch and other early bacteriologists as a host for bacterial infections, hence a byword for "laboratory animal" even though less commonly used today.
- Myotis lucifugus (Little brown bat), used to prove echolocation exists in bats in 1930s and also used in experiments predicting microbat behavior as it is a reliable species that has typical features of a temperate bat species.
- Oryzias latipes (Medaka, or Japanese ricefish), important model in developmental biology, and has the advantage of being much sturdier than the traditional zebrafish.
- Mus musculus (Mouse), the classic model vertebrate. Many inbred strains exist, as well as lines selected for particular traits, often of ethological or medical interest, e.g. body size, obesity, muscularity, voluntary wheel-running behavior. (Quantitative genetics, Molecular evolution, Genomics)
- Heterocephalus glaber (Naked mole-rat), studied for their characteristic pain insensitivity, thermoregulation, cancer resistance, eusociality, and longevity.
- Nothobranchius furzeri, is studied because of their extreme short-lifespan in research on aging, disease and evolution.
- Astyanax mexicanus (Mexican tetra or blind cave fish), studied for their rapid convergent evolution of multiple traits across multiple populations, including troglomorphism, circadian rhythms, and sleep
- Columba livia domestica (Pigeon), studied extensively for cognitive science and animal intelligence
- Poecilia reticulata (Guppy), used to study sexual selection and sexual conflict
- Rattus norvegicus (Rat), particularly useful as a toxicology model; also particularly useful as a neurological model and source of primary cell cultures, owing to the larger size of organs and suborganellar structures relative to the mouse. (Molecular evolution, Genomics)
- Oryctolagus cuniculus domesticus (Domestic rabbit), used as immunology model for production of antibodies and toxicology model for eye irritation tests.
- Macaca mulatta (Rhesus macaque or rhesus monkey), used for studies on infectious disease and cognition.
- Macaca fascicularis (variously crab-eating macaque, long-tailed macaque, or cynomolgus macaque) used for studies on neuroscience and disease.
- Petromyzon marinus (Sea lamprey), spinal cord research
- Takifugu rubripes (Takifugu, a pufferfish), has a small genome with little junk DNA.
- Gasterosteus aculeatus (Three-spined stickleback), fish used to study ethology and behavioral ecology.
- Xenopus tropicalis and Xenopus laevis (African clawed frog), the eggs and embryos from these frogs are used in developmental biology, cell biology, toxicology, and neuroscience
- Taeniopygia guttata (Zebra finch), used in the study of the song system of songbirds and the study of non-mammalian auditory systems.
- Danio rerio (Zebrafish), freshwater fish with a transparent body during early development, which provides unique visual access to the animal's internal anatomy. Zebrafish are used to study development, toxicology and toxicopathology, specific gene function and roles of signaling pathways.
