= Ralf Reski =

Plant biologist

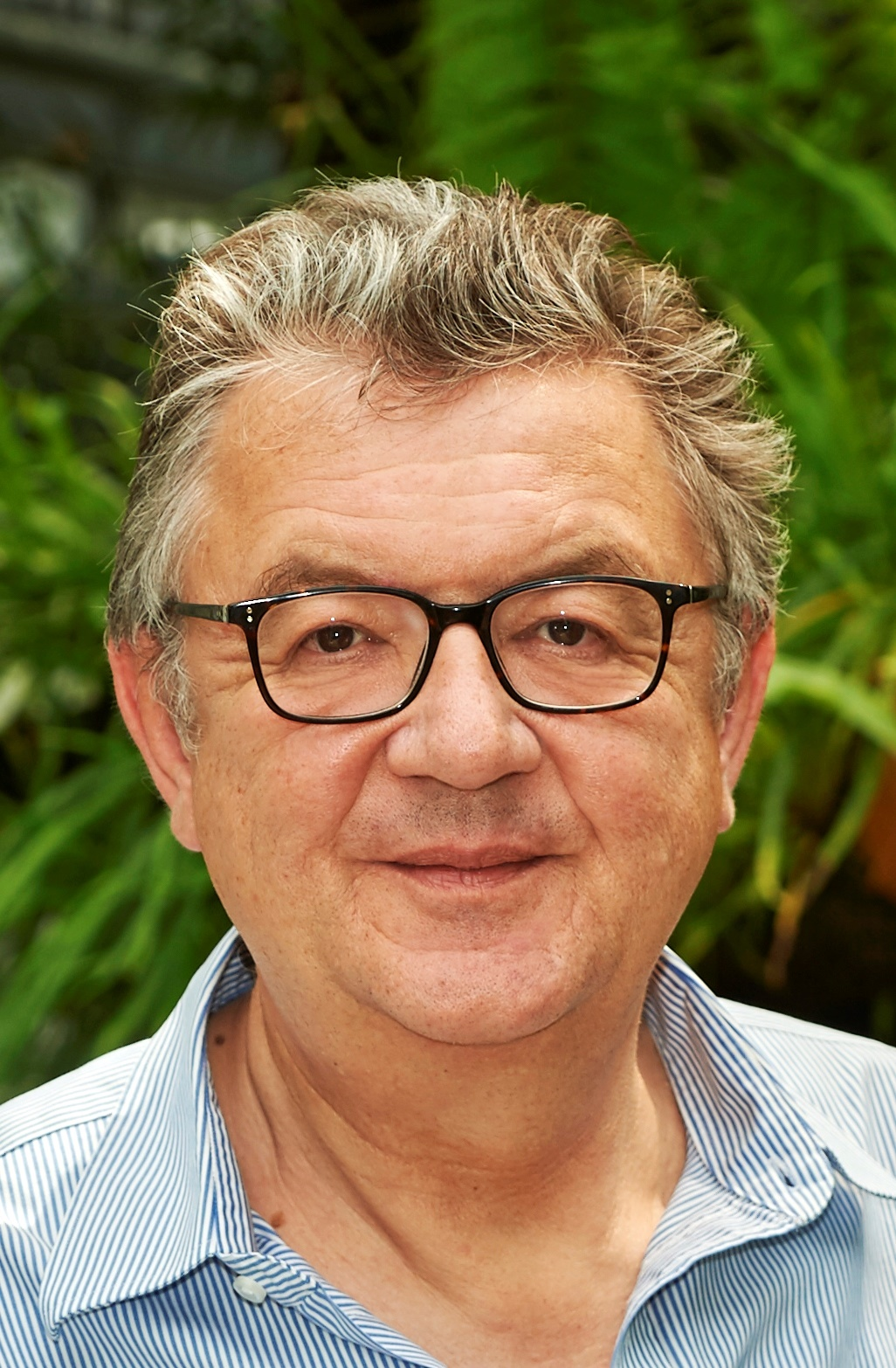
- Reski in 2018
- Born: 18 November 1958 (age 67); Gelsenkirchen, Germany

Ralf Reski (born 18 November 1958 in Gelsenkirchen) is a German professor of plant biotechnology and former dean of the Faculty of Biology of the University of Freiburg. He is also affiliated to the French École supérieure de biotechnologie Strasbourg (ESBS) and Senior Fellow at the Freiburg Institute for Advanced Studies.

== Biography ==
Ralf Reski studied biology, chemistry and pedagogy at the Universities of Giessen and Hamburg. He was awarded his doctorate in Genetics in 1990 by the University of Hamburg and received his habilitation in General Botany in 1994. From 1996 until 1999, he was a Heisenberg-Fellow of the German Research Foundation.

He was appointed Distinguished Professor and entitled Ordinarius at the University of Freiburg in 1999, where he became Head of the newly established Department of Plant Biotechnology. From 2001 until 2011, Reski was Director Plant Biotechnology at the Centre for Applied Biosciences (ZAB, University of Freiburg). From 2010 until 2019 he was elected senator and speaker in the academic senat of the university Freiburg.

Reski is founding principal investigator (PI) of four Excellence Clusters: the Centre for Biological Signalling Studies (bioss), the Centre for Integrative Biological Signalling Studies (CIBSS), Living, Adaptive and Energy-Autonomous Materials Systems (livMATs), and of the Spemann Graduate School of Biology and Medicine (SGBM). Since 2011, he also is Senior Fellow at the Freiburg Institute for Advanced Studies (FRIAS). SGBM, bioss and FRIAS are funded within the German Universities Excellence Initiative. Furthermore, Reski is a founding PI of the Freiburg Initiative for Systems Biology (FRISYS) funded by the Federal Ministry of Education and Research (BMBF). Reski was one of the board members of the International Union of Biological Sciences (IUBS) from 2009 to 2012. From 2010 until 2013, Reski was the coordinator of QualFEEM, a TEMPUS-project for the improvement of Higher Education in the field of "environmental management and ecology" at the Russian Universities in Altai, Novosibirsk, Omsk and Tyumen. In 2011 Reski was co-founder of the Trinational Institute for Plant Research (TIP).

In 2011 Ralf Reski was elected as lifetime member of the Heidelberg Academy of Sciences and Humanities (German:Heidelberger Akademie der Wissenschaften).

In 2012 he organized a Plant Biology Congress which attracted 1000 researchers from about 60 countries.

In 2013 Reski became senior fellow at the University of Strasbourg Institute for Advanced Study (USIAS).

From 2015 until 2019 he was the project coordinator of the Erasmus Programme "Trans-regional environmental awareness for sustainable usage of water resources" – in short TREASURE-WATER that addresses higher education and training for the sustainable management of shared natural water resources in the area of the Russian Federation and Kazakhstan.

== Research ==
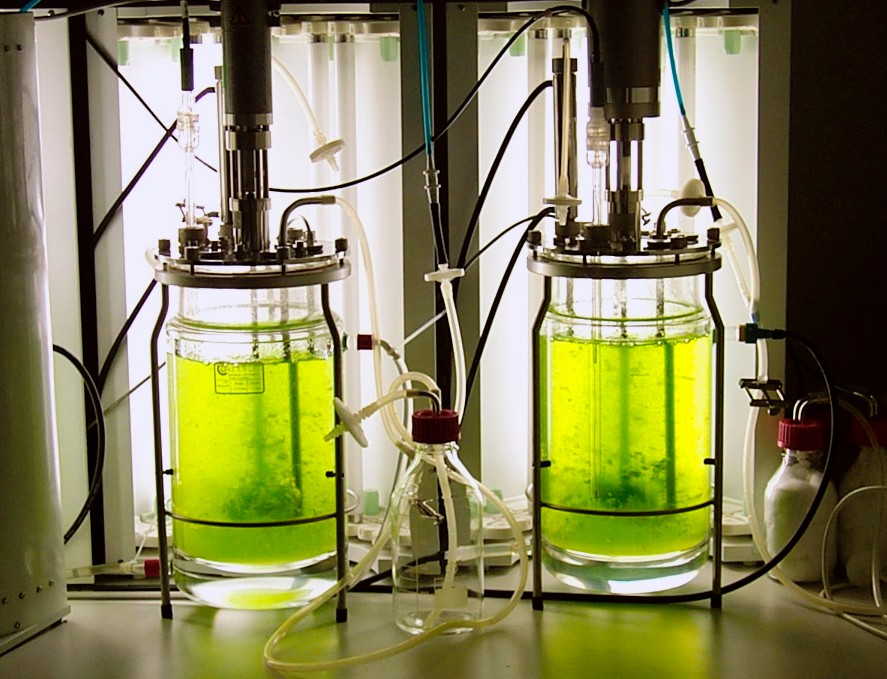
Moss bioreactor with Physcomitrella patens

Reski's main area of research with more than 350 scientific publications 350 comprises the genetics, proteomics, metabolism, and cell development of moss plants, using the technique of homologous recombination for creating knockout mosses by gene targeting in a reverse genetics approach. Reski and his coworkers have identified hitherto unknown genes with biotechnological implication for agriculture and forestry. The cultivation of moss cells and their utilization for Molecular Farming is another main focal point of his research.

In 1998, Reski proposed the moss Physcomitrella patens as a model plant in biological research. Since then, he has contributed significantly towards mosses becoming a model plant in biological research on a worldwide scale. In 2004, Reski and colleagues from the United States, the United Kingdom and Japan successfully proposed the genome of Physcomitrella patens for complete sequencing at the Joint Genome Institute (JGI), a facility of the U.S. Department of Energy (DOE). The genome was released in December 2007, with the bioinformatic work spearheaded by Reski's group and financed by the German National Science Foundation (Deutsche Forschungsgemeinschaft DFG). Due to its scientific and economic importance, the genome of Physcomitrella patens has been chosen as a "flagship plant genome" by the DOE JGI in 2010.

Reski and his group are also working on peat mosses of the genus Genus Sphagnum in the framework of the German National Peatland Protection Strategy. They have established the largest collection of axenic Sphagnum strains world-wide and screen them in moss bioreactors for rapid growth. These mosses are used for peatland restoration to combat climate change.

Also in 1998, Reski and coworkers generated a knockout moss by deleting an ftsZ gene and thus identified the first gene essential in the division of an organelle in any eukaryote. Based on the results of further research on the ftsZ-gene family, Ralf Reski coined the term "plastoskeleton", analogous to the term "cytoskeleton", in 2000 and presented a new concept in cell biology of how chloroplasts, the green cell organelles of plants, change shape and divide.

In 1999, the chemical company BASF invested more than 30 Mio. DM in a four-year cooperation project with Reski to identify new genes which may be able to make crop plants more resistant to drought, cold and attack by pests. Plants with improved nutritional value (vitamins or polyunsaturated fatty acids) have also been in the research focus of their collaboration. In the same year, Reski invented the moss bioreactor and founded "greenovation Biotech GmbH", a biotechnology company utilizing moss bioreactors for the production of pharmaceuticals. In 2011, Reski and coworkers produced recombinant, biologically active human factor H in a moss bioreactor. In 2017 the first clinical trial phase 1 was completed testing the enzyme Alpha-galactosidase, which was produced in moss, to treat Fabry disease.

In 2010, Reski established the International Moss Stock Center (IMSC), which stores and freely distributes moss strains, transgenics and ecotypes. The IMSC assigns accession numbers that can be used in scientific publications to facilitate identification and availability of the respective samples.

Also in 2010, Reski and colleagues discovered a new mechanism of gene regulation; the epigenetic gene silencing by microRNAs.

Reski is directly involved in Mossclone, a European project (7th Framework Programme, FP7) which started in 2012 and aims to develop an air quality monitoring tool by using devitalized moss clones.

In 2016, Reski and colleagues identified a homeobox gene as the master regulator for embryo development and a basic genetic toolkit for stoma development and in 2017 they described that the moss cuticle was ancestral to lignin evolution.

In 2018, Reski and colleagues analysed the six RecQ proteins in Physcomitrella patens and in Arabidopsis thaliana. They found that moss RecQ4, the ortholog of the human Bloom syndrome protein, acts as a repressor of homologous recombination, protects the genome from mutations, and is pivotal for embryogenesis and subsequent plant development. In contrast, moss RecQ6 acts as a potent enhancer of gene targeting.

In 2023, Reski and colleagues published the genome sequence of a living fossil, the moss Takakia lepidozioides from Tibet. It faces extinction due to climate change.

=== Scientific board memberships ===
- 2003 – 2012 Supervisory Board of BioPro GmbH, an enterprise of the federal state of Baden-Württemberg
- 2004–2010 Advisory board BMBF program Risk assessment in Plant Biotechnology
- 2007–2010 Think tank on Innovation Policy (German Innovationsrat) headed by Günther Oettinger, former Minister-President of Baden-Württemberg and now European Commissioner
- 2008–2012 elected president of Deutsches Nationalkomitee Biologie (DNK, German National Committee of IUBS and IUMS within ICSU)
- 2008–2012 Advisory board of German Life Sciences Association (Verband Biologie, Biowissenschaften und Biomedizin in Deutschland e.V., VBIO)
- 2009–2012 Executive committee Member of the IUBS
- 2016–2020 Advisory Board CeBiTec – Center for Biotechnology, Bielefeld University

=== Editorial board memberships of scientific journals ===
- 2002–2012 Plant Cell Reports
- 2004–2006 Plant Biology (Guest-Editor)
- 2008–2013 Journal of Biomedicine and Biotechnology
- 2009–2012 Plant Cell Reports, editor-in-chief
- 2010–2012 Biology International

== See also ==
- University of Freiburg Faculty of Biology
