= Mutant =

Phenotypically-different organism resulting from a mutation

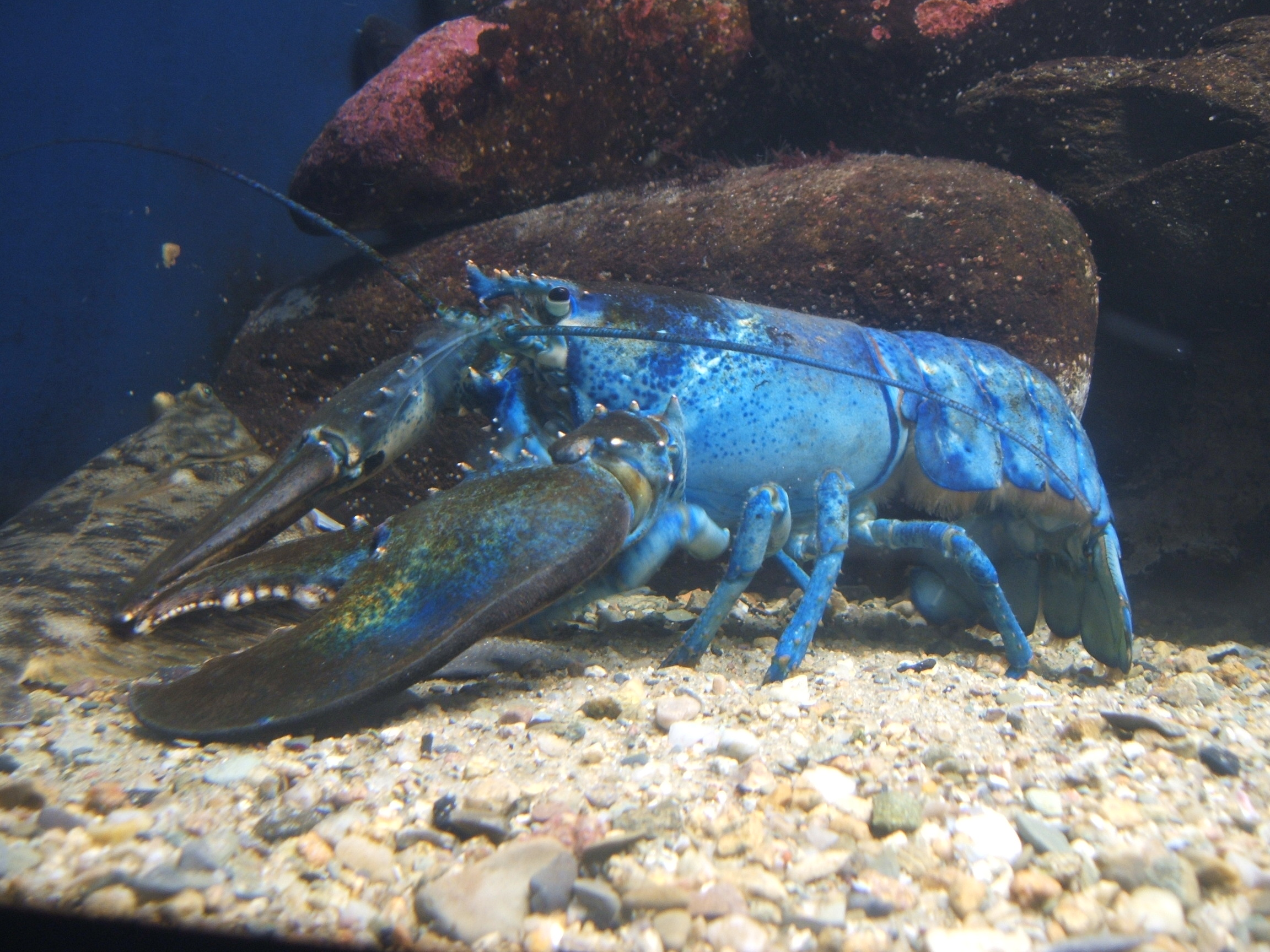
The blue lobster, an example of a mutant

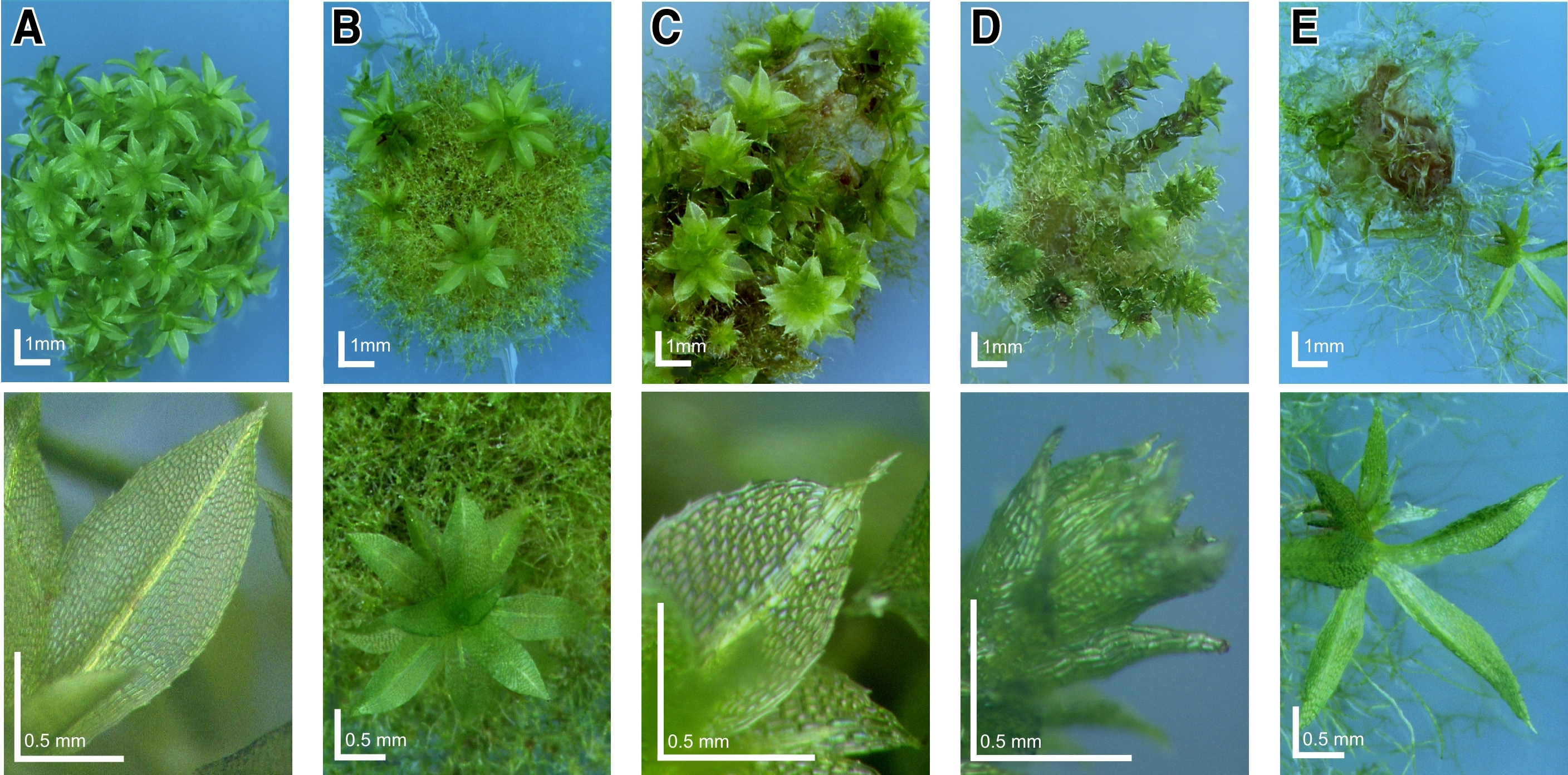
Wild-type Physcomitrella and knockout mosses: Deviating phenotypes induced in gene-disruption library transformants. Physcomitrella wild-type and transformed plants were grown on minimal Knop medium to induce differentiation and development of gametophores. For each plant, an overview (upper row, scale bar corresponds to 1 mm) and a close-up (bottom row, scale bar equals 0.5 mm) is shown. A, Haploid wild-type moss plant completely covered with leafy gametophores and close-up of wild-type leaf. B–E, Different mutants.

In biology, and especially in genetics, a mutant is an organism or a new genetic character arising or resulting from an instance of mutation, which is generally an alteration of the DNA sequence of the genome or chromosome of an organism. It is a characteristic that would not be observed naturally in a specimen. The term mutant is also applied to a virus with an alteration in its nucleotide sequence whose genome is in the nuclear genome. The natural occurrence of genetic mutations is integral to the process of evolution. The study of mutants is an integral part of biology; by understanding the effect that a mutation in a gene has, it is possible to establish the normal function of that gene.

== Mutants arise by mutation ==
Mutants arise by mutations occurring in pre-existing genomes as a result of errors of DNA replication or errors of DNA repair. Errors of replication often involve translesion synthesis by a DNA polymerase when it encounters and bypasses a damaged base in the template strand. A DNA damage is an abnormal chemical structure in DNA, such as a strand break or an oxidized base, whereas a mutation, by contrast, is a change in the sequence of standard base pairs. Errors of repair occur when repair processes inaccurately replace a damaged DNA sequence. The DNA repair process microhomology-mediated end joining is particularly error-prone.

== Etymology ==
Although not all mutations have a noticeable phenotypic effect, the common usage of the word "mutant" is generally a pejorative term, only used for genetically or phenotypically noticeable mutations. Previously, people used the word "sport" (related to spurt) to refer to abnormal specimens. The scientific usage is broader, referring to any organism differing from the wild type. The word finds its origin in the Latin term mūtant- (stem of mūtāns), which means "to change".

Mutants should not be confused with organisms born with developmental abnormalities, which are caused by errors during morphogenesis. In a developmental abnormality, the DNA of the organism is unchanged and the abnormality cannot be passed on to progeny. Conjoined twins are the result of developmental abnormalities.

Chemicals that cause developmental abnormalities are called teratogens; these may also cause mutations, but their effect on development is not related to mutations. Chemicals that induce mutations are called mutagens. Most mutagens are also considered to be carcinogens.

== Epigenetic alterations ==
Mutations are distinctly different from epigenetic alterations, although they share some common features. Both arise as a chromosomal alteration that can be replicated and passed on to subsequent cell generations. Both, when occurring within a gene, may silence expression of the gene. Whereas mutant cell lineages arise as a change in the sequence of standard bases, epigenetically altered cell lineages retain the sequence of standard bases but have gene sequences with changed levels of expression that can be passed down to subsequent cell generations. Epigenetic alterations include methylation of CpG islands of a gene promoter as well as specific chromatin histone modifications. Faulty repair of chromosomes at sites of DNA damage can give rise both to mutant cell lineages and/or epigenetically altered cell lineages.

== See also ==
- Evolution
- Genetic engineering
- Genetically modified organism
- Mutants in fiction
- Mutationism
- Synthetic lethality
- Synthetic viability
