= IMSC =

IMSC may refer to:

== Organizations ==
- International Maritime Security Construct, a US-led coalition formed in 2019 and focused on the Arabian Gulf
- Institute of Mathematical Sciences (India), a research institute in Chennai, India
- Integrated Media Systems Center on the campus of University of Southern California, Los Angeles, United States
- International Military Sports Council
- International Moss Stock Center, an international resource center in Freiburg i. Br., Germany

== Broadcasting and Internet Video formats ==
- Internet Media Subtitles and Captions, is a set of specifications on how to manage Subtitles and Captions in MPEG CMAF, IMF, ATSC, DVB TTML, HbbTV, on iOS,...

== Cellular networking ==
- Instant message service center, a network element in the mobile telephone network which delivers instant messages

== Other ==
- The International Mass Spectrometry Conference organised by the International Mass Spectrometry Foundation
