= Deutsches Nationalkomitee Biologie =

The Deutsches Nationalkomitee Biologie (abbreviated DNK, German National Committee of Biology in English) is a scientific non-profit and non-governmental organisation which represents German biologists on an international level. It is embedded in an international hierarchy. The DNK acts on behalf of many biological societies to ensure their scientific and political interests in the international boards of the International Council of Scientific Unions (ICSU), and especially in the International Union of Biological Sciences (IUBS) and the International Union of Microbiological Societies (IUMS).

== Duties and Objectives ==
The DNK has three major duties:

- It draws up and proposes scientific programs to the ICSU.
- It informs about programs and activities and links the ICSU, the IUBS and the IUMS with German biologists by furthering information flow via its website.
- It designates representatives for the committees and executive boards of the ICSU, the IUBS, the IUMS, and their scientific sections.

The DNK furthers scientific programs through national and international meetings or conferences as well as with project-specific research support und funding. The DNK does not support single scientific projects; this is covered by the German Research Foundation (DFG) or the Federal Ministry of Education and Research (BMBF) or the State Ministries for Science and Research. For example, the DNK had proposed that the IUBS plays a part in the ABS programme (Access and Benefit Sharing) at the Rio Convention on Biological Diversity. In May 2008 the DNK stimulated the scientific meeting Biodiversity Research - Safeguarding the Future. This conference was preceding the ninth meeting of the Conference of the Parties (COP9) of the Convention on Biological Diversity taking place in May 2008 in Germany.

== Organisation ==
The organs of the DNK are the board and the general assembly.

=== Board ===
The board carries out the resolutions of the general assembly and informs and links all participants. The board consists of the chairperson, his or her deputy and a secretary. They are elected for two years and derive from the delegates of the general assembly. The speaker of the scientific societies in the Verband Biologie, Biowissenschaften und Biomedizin in Deutschland e.V. (VBIO) is also a board member.

=== Current Board ===
Since June 2019:

- Chairperson: Prof. Dr. Karl-Josef Dietz
- Deputy chairperson: Prof. Dr. Felicitas Pfeifer
- Secretary: Dr. Kerstin Elbing (provisional)

=== General Assembly ===
The general assembly decides on all activities and issues and elects the persons of the executive board. Every scientific society which is a member of the DNK names a permanent delegate into the general assembly. Members of the ICSU, the IUBS, and the IUMS are permanent guests of the DNK. Additional guests may be invited on an individual basis.

== Cooperation ==
The DNK collaborates with and is a cooperating member of the Verband Biologie, Biowissenschaften und Biomedizin in Deutschland e.V. (VBIO). The chairperson of the DNK is member of the advisory board of the VBIO. The chairpersons of the DNK, (2008-2012: Prof. Dr. Ralf Reski; 2012-219: Dr. Regine Jahn) are members of the advisory board of the VBIO. The speaker of the scientific societies in the Verband Biologie, Biowissenschaften und Biomedizin in Deutschland e.V. (VBIO) is also an appointed board member of the DNK. His or her role will be assigned at the general assembly.

== Legal Status and Finances ==
The DNK is a non-profit organisation which does not pursuit economic objectives and does not have funds at its disposal. The German Research Foundation (DFG) supports the DNK financially by e.g. covering travelling costs for the attendance of the annual general assemblies.

== Members ==
As of January 2009 42 German scientific societies (as for example the Deutsche Botanische Gesellschaft, DBG, German Botanical Society) and organisations are members of the DNK. Each one sends a permanent delegate to the general assembly.

== Former board members ==
March 2012 - June 2019 (newly elected in 2012)

- Chairperson: Prof. Dr. Ralf Reski
- Deputy chairperson: Prof. Dr. Reinhard Krämer
- Secretary: Prof. em. Dr. Dr. h.c. Erwin Beck

--

- March 2008 - March 2012 (newly elected in 2008):
- Chairperson: Prof. Dr. Ralf Reski
- Deputy chairperson: Prof. Dr. Reinhard Krämer
- Secretary: Prof. em. Dr. Dr. h.c. Erwin Beck

--

- November 2002 - March 2008 (newly elected in 2005):
- Chairperson: Prof. em. Dr. Dr. h.c. Erwin Beck
- Deputy chairperson: Prof. Dr. Reinhard Krämer
- Secretary: Prof. Dr. Klaus Hausmann
