= Knockout moss =

Genetically modified moss plant

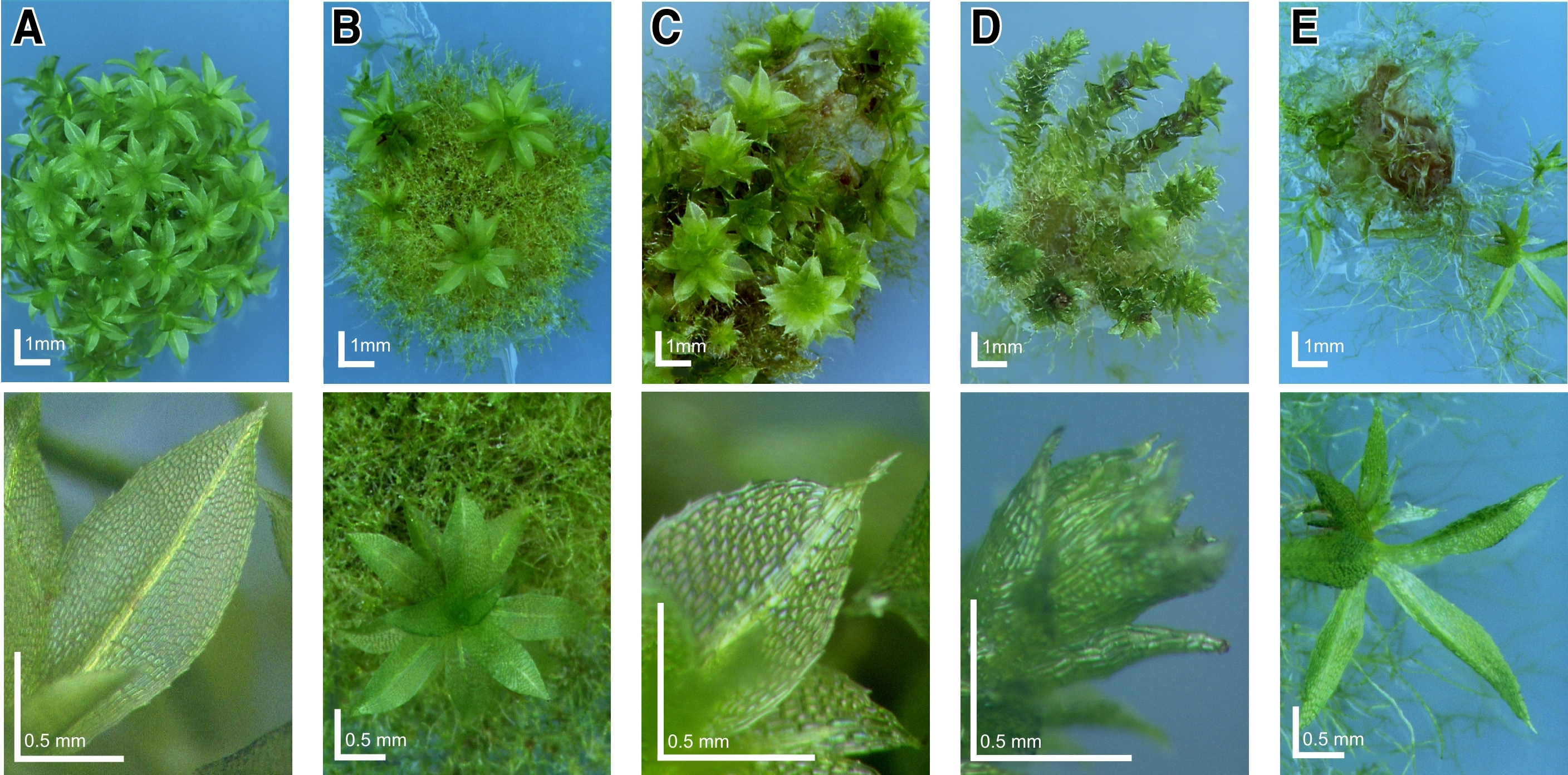
Wild-type Physcomitrella and knockout mosses: Deviating phenotypes induced in gene-disruption library transformants. Physcomitrella wild-type and transformed plants were grown on minimal Knop medium to induce differentiation and development of gametophores. For each plant, an overview (upper row; scale bar corresponds to 1 mm) and a close-up (bottom row; scale bar equals 0.5 mm) are shown. A: Haploid wild-type moss plant completely covered with leafy gametophores and close-up of wild-type leaf. B–E: Different mutants.

A knockout moss is a kind of genetically modified moss. One or more of the moss's specific genes are deleted or inactivated ("knocked out"), for example by gene targeting or other methods. After the deletion of a gene, the knockout moss has lost the trait encoded by this gene. Thus, the function of this gene can be inferred. This scientific approach is called reverse genetics because the scientist wants to understand the function of a specific gene. In classical genetics, the scientist starts with a phenotype of interest and searches for the gene that causes this phenotype. Knockout mosses are relevant for basic research in biology as well as in biotechnology.

== Scientific background ==
The targeted deletion or alteration of genes relies on the integration of a DNA strand at a specific and predictable position into the genome of the host cell. This DNA strand must be engineered in such a way that both ends are identical to this specific gene locus. This is a prerequisite for being efficiently integrated via homologous recombination (HR). This is similar to the process used for creating knockout mice. So far, this method of gene targeting in land plants has been carried out in the mosses Physcomitrella patens and Ceratodon purpureus, since in these non-seed plant species the efficiency of HR is several orders of magnitude higher than in seed plants.

Knockout mosses are stored at and distributed by a specialized biobank, the International Moss Stock Center.

== Method ==
For altering moss genes in a targeted way, the DNA-construct needs to be incubated together with moss protoplasts and with polyethylene glycol (PEG). Because mosses are haploid organisms, the regenerating moss filaments (protonemata) can be directly assayed for gene targeting within six weeks when utilizing PCR methods.

== Examples ==
=== Chloroplast division ===
The first scientific publication in which knockout moss was used to identify the function of a hitherto-unknown gene appeared in 1998, and was authored by Ralf Reski and coworkers. They deleted the ftsZ-gene and thus functionally identified the first gene pivotal for the division of an organelle in any eukaryote.

=== Protein modifications ===
Physcomitrella plants were engineered with multiple knockouts to prevent the plant-specific glycosylation of proteins, an important post-translational modification. These knockout mosses are used to produce complex biopharmaceuticals in the field of molecular farming.

=== Mutant collection ===
In cooperation with the chemical company BASF, Ralf Reski and coworkers established a collection of knockout mosses to use for gene identification.
