= Archegonium =

Organ of the gametophyte of certain plants, producing and containing the ovum

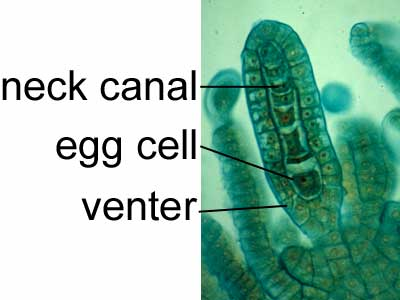
Diagram of archegonium anatomy

An archegonium (pl.: archegonia), from the Ancient Greek ἀρχή ("beginning") and γόνος ("offspring"), is a multicellular structure or organ of the gametophyte phase of certain plants, producing and containing the ovum or female gamete. The corresponding male organ is called the antheridium. The archegonium has a long neck canal or venter and a swollen base. Archegonia are typically located on the surface of the plant thallus, although in the hornworts they are embedded.

== Bryophytes ==
In bryophytes and other cryptogams, sperm reach the archegonium by swimming in water films, whereas in Pinophyta and angiosperms, the pollen are delivered by wind or animal vectors and the sperm are delivered by means of a pollen tube.

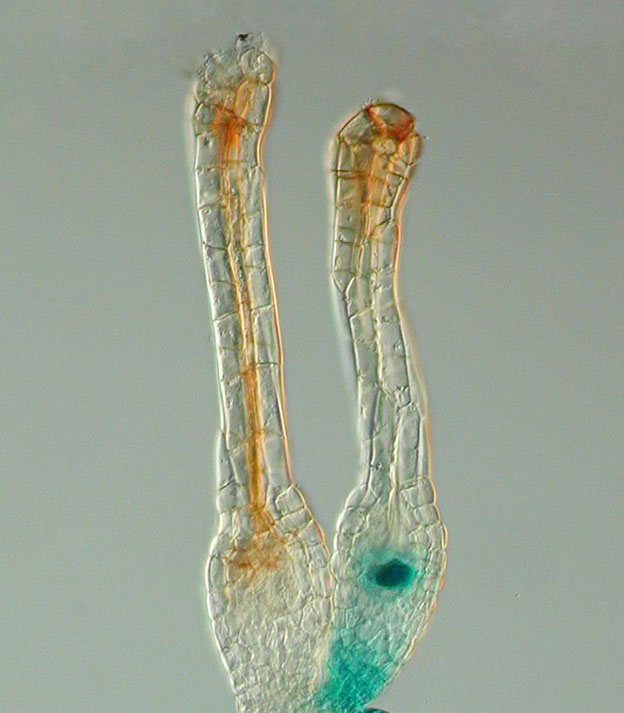
Gene expression pattern determined by histochemical GUS assays in Physcomitrella patens

In the moss Physcomitrella patens, archegonia are not embedded but are located on top of the leafy gametophore (s. Figure). The Polycomb protein FIE is expressed in the unfertilized egg cell (right) as the blue colour after GUS staining reveals. Soon after fertilisation, the FIE gene is inactivated (the blue colour is no longer visible, left) in the young embryo.

== Gymnosperms ==
Gymnosperm archegonia are much-reduced and embedded in the megagametophytes. The term is not used for angiosperms or the gnetophytes Gnetum and Welwitschia because the megagametophyte is reduced to just a few cells, one of which differentiates into the egg cell. The function of surrounding the gamete is assumed in large part by diploid cells of the megasporangium (nucellus) inside the ovule. Gymnosperms have their archegonium formed after pollination inside female conifer cones (megastrobili).
