= Reverse genetics =

Method in molecular genetics

Diagram illustrating the development process of avian flu vaccine by reverse genetics techniques

Reverse genetics is a method in molecular genetics that is used to help understand the function(s) of a gene by analysing the phenotypic effects caused by genetically engineering specific nucleic acid sequences within the gene. The process proceeds in the opposite direction to forward genetic screens of classical genetics. While forward genetics seeks to find the genetic basis of a phenotype or trait, reverse genetics seeks to find what phenotypes are controlled by particular genetic sequences.

Automated DNA sequencing generates large volumes of genomic sequence data relatively rapidly. Many genetic sequences are discovered in advance of other, less easily obtained, biological information. Reverse genetics attempts to connect a given genetic sequence with specific effects on the organism. Reverse genetics systems can also allow the recovery and generation of infectious or defective viruses with desired mutations. This allows the ability to study the virus in vitro and in vivo.

== Techniques used ==
In order to learn the influence a sequence has on phenotype, or to discover its biological function, researchers can engineer a change or disrupt the DNA. After this change has been made a researcher can look for the effect of such alterations in the whole organism. There are several different methods of reverse genetics:

=== Directed deletions and point mutations ===
Site-directed mutagenesis is a sophisticated technique that can either change regulatory regions in the promoter of a gene or make subtle codon changes in the open reading frame to identify important amino residues for protein function.

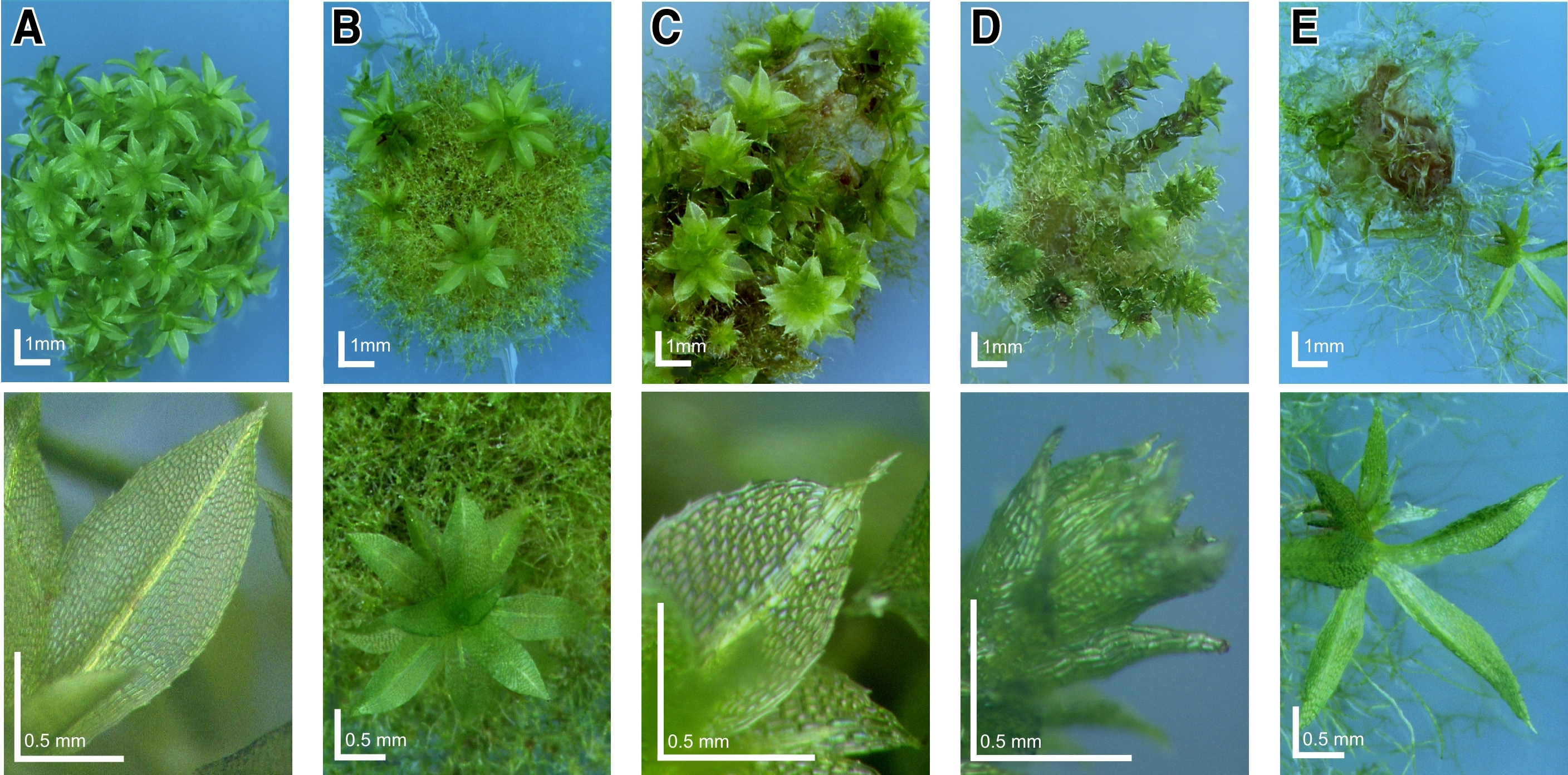
Wild-type Physcomitrella patens and knockout mosses: Deviating phenotypes induced in gene-disruption library transformants. Physcomitrella wild-type and transformed plants were grown on minimal Knop medium to induce differentiation and development of gametophores. For each plant, an overview (upper row; scale bar corresponds to 1 mm) and a close-up (bottom row; scale bar equals 0.5 mm) are shown. A: Haploid wild-type moss plant completely covered with leafy gametophores and close-up of wild-type leaf. B–E: Different mutants.

Alternatively, the technique can be used to create null alleles so that the gene is not functional. For example, deletion of a gene by gene targeting (gene knockout) can be done in some organisms, such as yeast, mice and moss. Unique among plants, in Physcomitrella patens, gene knockout via homologous recombination to create knockout moss (see figure) is nearly as efficient as in yeast. In the case of the yeast model system directed deletions have been created in every non-essential gene in the yeast genome. In the case of the plant model system huge mutant libraries have been created based on gene disruption constructs. In gene knock-in, the endogenous exon is replaced by an altered sequence of interest.

More recently, engineered nucleases, especially CRISPR-Cas9, have made reverse-genetic knockout mutations and other defined sequence changes practical in many organisms and cell types that were previously difficult to manipulate genetically.

In some cases conditional alleles can be used so that the gene has normal function until the conditional allele is activated. This might entail 'knocking in' recombinase sites (such as lox or frt sites) that will cause a deletion at the gene of interest when a specific recombinase (such as CRE, FLP) is induced. Cre or Flp recombinases can be induced with chemical treatments, heat shock treatments or be restricted to a specific subset of tissues.

Another technique that can be used is TILLING. This is a method that combines a standard and efficient technique of mutagenesis with a chemical mutagen such as ethyl methanesulfonate (EMS) with a sensitive DNA-screening technique that identifies point mutations in a target gene.

In the field of virology, reverse-genetics techniques can be used to recover full-length infectious viruses with desired mutations or insertions in the viral genomes or in specific virus genes. Technologies that allow these manipulations include circular polymerase extension reaction (CPER) which was first used to generate infectious cDNA for Kunjin virus a close relative of West Nile virus. CPER has also been successfully utilised to generate a range of positive-sense RNA viruses such as SARS-CoV-2, the causative agent of COVID-19.

=== Gene silencing ===
The discovery of gene silencing using double stranded RNA, also known as RNA interference (RNAi), and the development of gene knockdown using Morpholino oligos, have made disrupting gene expression an accessible technique for many more investigators. This method is often referred to as a gene knockdown since the effects of these reagents are generally temporary, in contrast to gene knockouts which are permanent.

RNAi creates a specific knockout effect without actually mutating the DNA of interest. In C. elegans, RNAi has been used to systematically interfere with the expression of most genes in the genome. RNAi acts by directing cellular systems to degrade target messenger RNA (mRNA).

RNAi interference, specifically gene silencing, has become a useful tool to silence the expression of genes and identify and analyze their loss-of-function phenotype. When mutations occur in alleles, the function which it represents and encodes also is mutated and lost; this is generally called a loss-of-function mutation. The ability to analyze the loss-of-function phenotype allows analysis of gene function when there is no access to mutant alleles.

While RNA interference relies on cellular components for efficacy (e.g. the Dicer proteins, the RISC complex) a simple alternative for gene knockdown is Morpholino antisense oligos. Morpholinos bind and block access to the target mRNA without requiring the activity of cellular proteins and without necessarily accelerating mRNA degradation. Morpholinos are effective in systems ranging in complexity from cell-free translation in a test tube to in vivo studies in large animal models.

=== Interference using transgenes ===
A molecular genetic approach is the creation of transgenic organisms that overexpress a normal gene of interest. The resulting phenotype may reflect the normal function of the gene.

Alternatively it is possible to overexpress mutant forms of a gene that interfere with the normal (wildtype) gene's function. For example, over-expression of a mutant gene may result in high levels of a non-functional protein resulting in a dominant negative interaction with the wildtype protein. In this case the mutant version will out compete for the wildtype proteins partners resulting in a mutant phenotype.

Other mutant forms can result in a protein that is abnormally regulated and constitutively active ('on' all the time). This might be due to removing a regulatory domain or mutating a specific amino residue that is reversibly modified (by phosphorylation, methylation, or ubiquitination). Either change is critical for modulating protein function and often result in informative phenotypes.

== Vaccine synthesis ==
Reverse genetics plays a large role in vaccine synthesis. Vaccines can be created by engineering novel genotypes of infectious viral strains which diminish their pathogenic potency enough to facilitate immunity in a host. The reverse genetics approach to vaccine synthesis utilizes known viral genetic sequences to create a desired phenotype: a virus with both a weakened pathological potency and a similarity to the current circulating virus strain. Reverse genetics provides a convenient alternative to the traditional method of creating inactivated vaccines, viruses which have been killed using heat or other chemical methods.

Vaccines created through reverse genetics methods are known as attenuated vaccines, named because they contain weakened (attenuated) live viruses. Attenuated vaccines are created by combining genes from a novel or current virus strain with previously attenuated viruses of the same species. Attenuated viruses are created by propagating a live virus under novel conditions, such as a chicken's egg. This produces a viral strain that is still live, but not pathogenic to humans, as these viruses are rendered defective in that they cannot replicate their genome enough to propagate and sufficiently infect a host. However, the viral genes are still expressed in the host's cell through a single replication cycle, allowing for the development of an immunity.

=== Influenza vaccine ===
A common way to create a vaccine using reverse genetic techniques is to utilize plasmids to synthesize attenuated viruses. This technique is most commonly used in the yearly production of influenza vaccines, where an eight plasmid system can rapidly produce an effective vaccine. The entire genome of the influenza A virus consists of eight RNA segments, so the combination of six attenuated viral cDNA plasmids with two wild-type plasmids allow for an attenuated vaccine strain to be constructed. For the development of influenza vaccines, the fourth and sixth RNA segments, encoding for the hemagglutinin and neuraminidase proteins respectively, are taken from the circulating virus, while the other six segments are derived from a previously attenuated master strain. The HA and NA proteins exhibit high antigen variety, and therefore are taken from the current strain for which the vaccine is being produced to create a well matching vaccine.

The plasmid used in this eight-plasmid system contains three major components that allow for vaccine development. Firstly, the plasmid contains restriction sites that will enable the incorporation of influenza genes into the plasmid. Secondly, the plasmid contains an antibiotic resistance gene, allowing the selection of merely plasmids containing the correct gene. Lastly, the plasmid contains two promotors, human pol 1 and pol 2 promotor that transcribe genes in opposite directions.

cDNA sequences of viral RNA are synthesized from attenuated master strains by using RT-PCR. This cDNA can then be inserted between an RNA polymerase I (Pol I) promoter and terminator sequence through restriction enzyme digestion. The cDNA and pol I sequence is then, in turn, surrounded by an RNA polymerase II (Pol II) promoter and a polyadenylation site. This entire sequence is then inserted into a plasmid. Six plasmids derived from attenuated master strain cDNA are cotransfected into a target cell, often a chicken egg, alongside two plasmids of the currently circulating wild-type influenza strain. Inside the target cell, the two "stacked" Pol I and Pol II enzymes transcribe the viral cDNA to synthesize both negative-sense viral RNA and positive-sense mRNA, effectively creating an attenuated virus. The result is a defective vaccine strain that is similar to the current virus strain, allowing a host to build immunity. This synthesized vaccine strain can then be used as a seed virus to create further vaccines.

=== Advantages and disadvantages ===
Vaccines engineered from reverse genetics carry several advantages over traditional vaccine designs. Most notable is speed of production. Due to the high antigenic variation in the HA and NA glycoproteins, a reverse-genetic approach allows for the necessary genotype (i.e. one containing HA and NA proteins taken from currently circulating virus strains) to be formulated rapidly. Additionally, since the final product of a reverse genetics attenuated vaccine production is a live virus, a higher immunogenicity is exhibited than in traditional inactivated vaccines, which must be killed using chemical procedures before being transferred as a vaccine. However, due to the live nature of attenuated viruses, complications may arise in immunodeficient patients. There is also the possibility that a mutation in the virus could result the vaccine to turning back into a live unattenuated virus.

== See also ==
- Forward genetics
