= Moss bioreactor =

Photobioreactor used for the cultivation and propagation of mosses

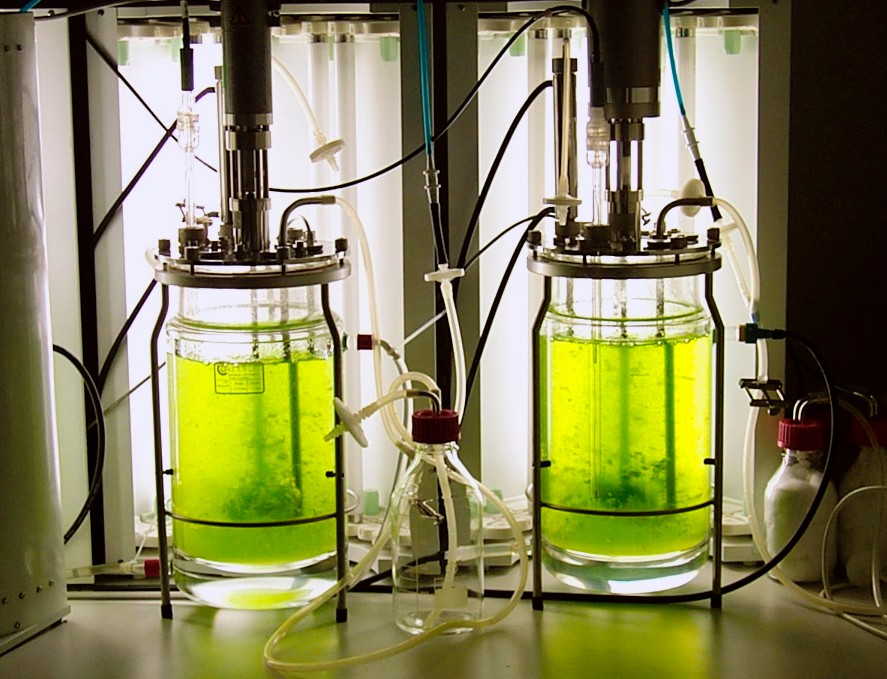
A moss bioreactor with Physcomitrella patens

A moss bioreactor is a photobioreactor used for the cultivation and propagation of mosses. It is usually used in molecular farming for the production of recombinant protein using transgenic moss. In environmental science moss bioreactors are used to multiply peat mosses e.g. by the Mossclone consortium to monitor air pollution.

Moss is a very frugal photoautotrophic organism that has been kept in vitro for research purposes since the beginning of the 20th century.

The first moss bioreactors for the model organism Physcomitrella patens were developed in the 1990s to comply with the safety standards regarding the handling of genetically modified organisms and to gain sufficient biomass for experimental purposes.

== Functional principle ==
The moss bioreactor is used to cultivate moss in a suspension culture in agitated, and aerated liquid medium. The culture is kept under lighting with temperature and pH value held constant. The culture medium—often a minimal medium—contains all nutrients and minerals needed for growth of the moss.

To ensure a maximum growth rate, the moss is kept at the protonema stage by continuous mechanical disruption, e.g. by using rotating blades. Once the density of the culture has reached a certain threshold, the lack of nutrients and the increasing concentration of phytohormones in the medium triggers the differentiation of the protonema to the adult gametophyte. At this point the culture has to be diluted with fresh medium if it is intended for further use.

According to the intended yield, this basic principle can be adapted to various types and sizes of bioreactors. The cultivation chamber can, for example, consist of a column, a tube, or exchangeable plastic bags.

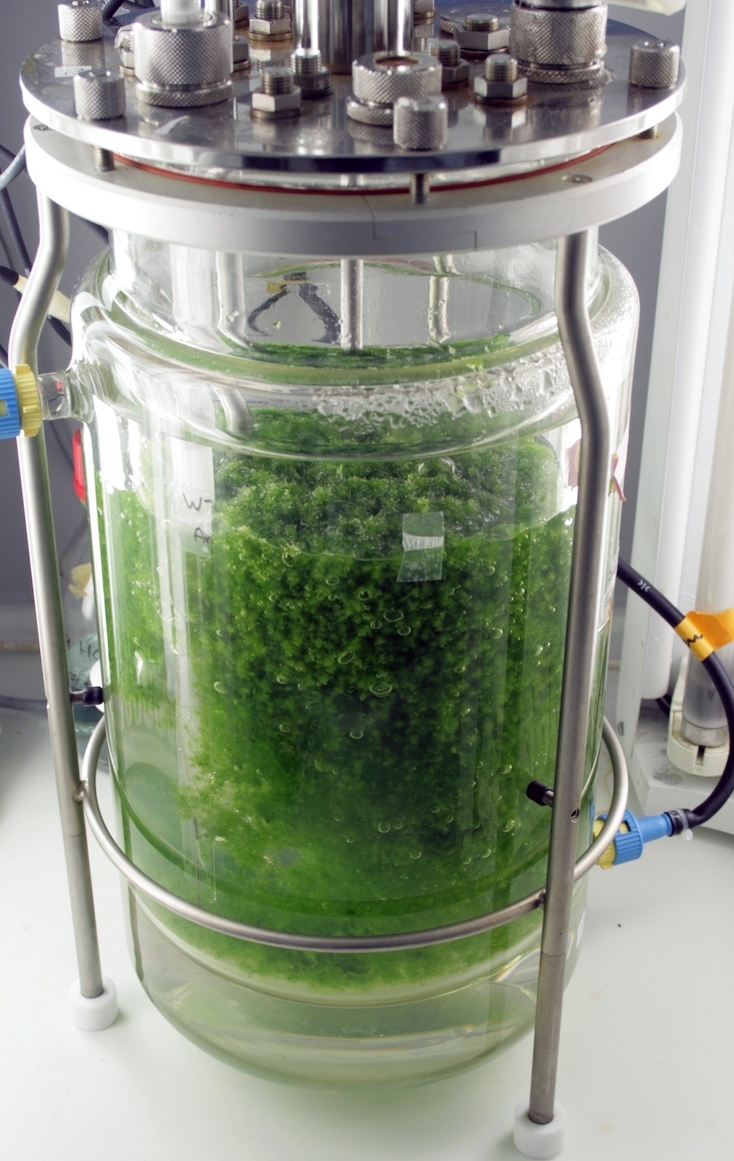
In this moss bioreactor the peat moss Sphagnum palustre is cultivated

== Production of biopharmaceuticals ==
Various biopharmaceuticals have already been produced using moss bioreactors. Ideally, the recombinant protein can be directly purified from the culture medium. One example for this production method is factor H: this molecule is part of the human complement system. Defects in the corresponding gene are associated with human diseases such as severe kidney and retinal disorders. Biologically active recombinant factor H was produced in a moss bioreactor for the first time in 2011. The enzyme alpha-galactosidase now is allowed to be produced in moss bioreactors by the German Federal Institute for Drugs and Medical Devices. It will be tested as enzyme replacement therapy in the treatment of Fabry's disease. The clinical trial phase 1 was completed in 2017.

== See also ==
- Algae bioreactor
- Bioreactor
- Molecular farming
- Photobioreactor
- Sphagnum palustre
- Physcomitrella patens
