= International Moss Stock Center =

Moss collection center

Coordinates: 48°00′35″N 7°51′22″E

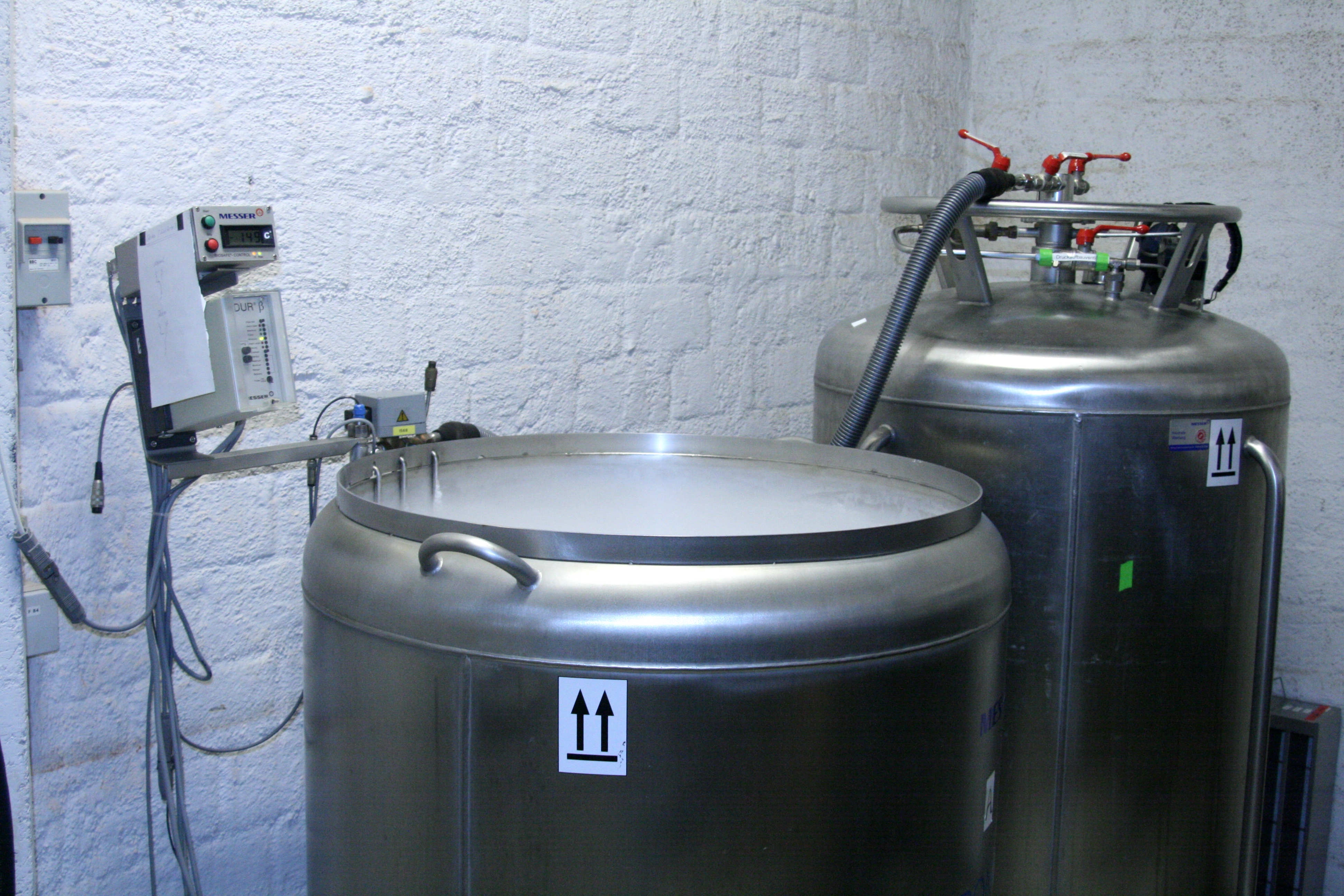
Cryopreservation container connected with a tank full of liquid nitrogen for automatic supply of liquid nitrogen. The container temperature is monitored by a computer-based program.

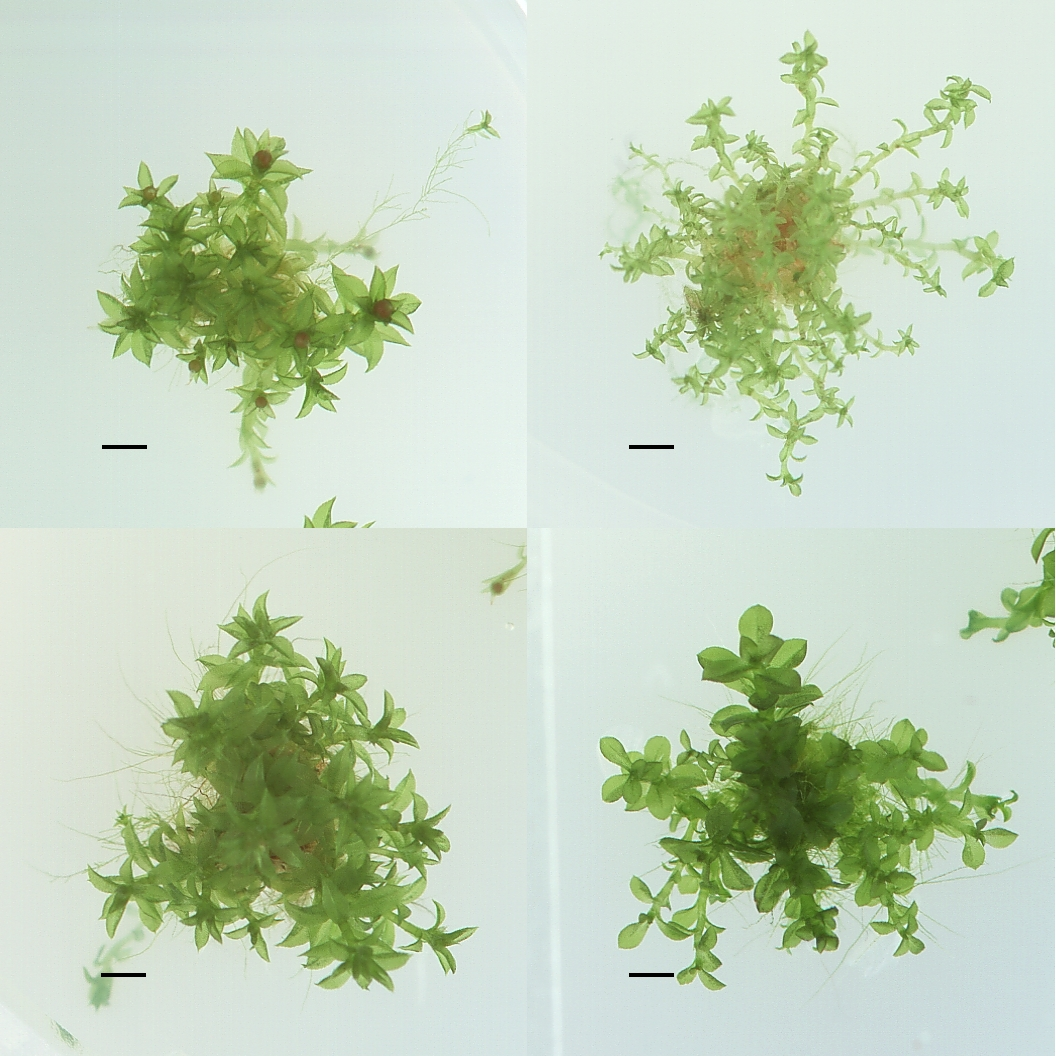
Four different ecotypes of Physcomitrella patens stored at the IMSC.

The International Moss Stock Center (IMSC) is a biorepository which is specialized in collecting, preserving and distributing moss plants of a high value of scientific research. The IMSC is located at the Faculty of Biology, Department of Plant Biotechnology, at the Albert-Ludwigs-University of Freiburg, Germany.

== Moss collection ==
The moss collection of the IMSC currently includes various ecotypes of Physcomitrella patens, Physcomitrium and Funaria as well as several transgenic and mutant lines of Physcomitrella patens, including knockout mosses.

== Storage conditions ==
The long-term storage of moss samples in the IMSC is carried out via cryopreservation in the gas phase of liquid nitrogen at temperatures below −135 °C in special freezer containers. It has been shown for Physcomitrella patens that the regeneration rate after cryopreservation is 100%.

Trackable accession numbers which may be used for citation purposes in publications are automatically assigned to all samples.

== Financial support ==
The IMSC is supported financially by the Chair Plant Biotechnology of Prof. Ralf Reski and the Centre for Biological Signalling Studies (bioss).
