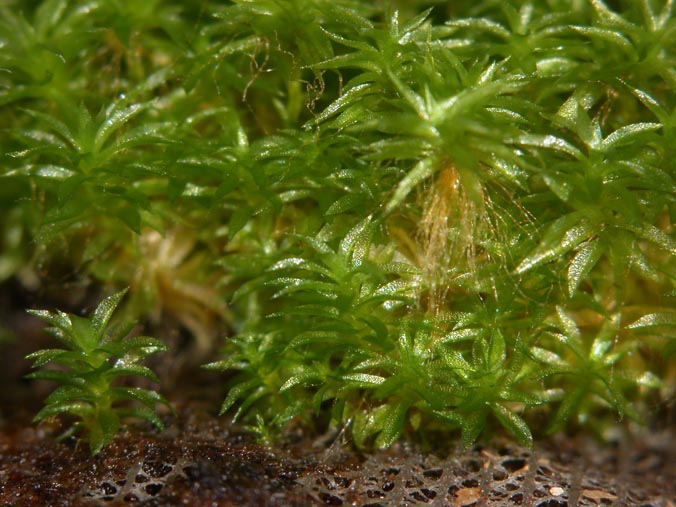

Scientific classification
- Kingdom: Plantae
- Division: Bryophyta
- Class: Bryopsida
- Order: Funariales
- Family: Funariaceae
- Genus: Physcomitrella
- Species: P. patens

Binomial name
- Physcomitrella patens (Hedw.) Bruch & Schimp.

Synonyms
- Phascum patens Hedw.; Aphanorrhegma patens (Hedw.) Lindb.; Ephemerum patens (Hedw.) Hampe; Genthia patens (Hedw.) Bayrh.; Physcomitrium patens (Hedw.) Mitt.; Stanekia patens (Hedw.) Opiz

= Physcomitrella patens =

Species of moss

Physcomitrella patens is a synonym of Physcomitrium patens, the spreading earthmoss. It is a moss, a bryophyte used as a model organism for studies on plant evolution, development, and physiology.

== Distribution and ecology ==
Physcomitrella patens is an early colonist of exposed mud and earth around the edges of pools of water. P. patens has a disjunct distribution in temperate parts of the world, with the exception of South America. The standard laboratory strain is the "Gransden" isolate, collected by H. Whitehouse from Gransden Wood, in Cambridgeshire in 1962.

== Model organism ==
Mosses share fundamental genetic and physiological processes with vascular plants, although the two lineages diverged early in land-plant evolution. A comparative study between modern representatives of the two lines may give insight into the evolution of mechanisms that contribute to the complexity of modern plants. In this context, P. patens is used as a model organism.

P. patens is one of a few known multicellular organisms with highly efficient homologous recombination. meaning that an exogenous DNA sequence can be targeted to a specific genomic position (a technique called gene targeting) to create knockout moss. This approach is called reverse genetics, and it is a method to study the function of genes that, when combined with studies in higher plants such as Arabidopsis thaliana, can be used to study molecular plant evolution.

The targeted deletion or alteration of moss genes relies on the integration of a short DNA strand at a defined position in the genome of the host cell. Both ends of this DNA strand are engineered to be identical to this specific gene locus. The DNA construct is then incubated with moss protoplasts in the presence of polyethylene glycol. As mosses are haploid organisms, the regenerating moss filaments (protonemata) can be directly assayed for gene targeting within 6 weeks using PCR methods. The first study using knockout moss appeared in 1998 and functionally identified ftsZ as a pivotal gene for the division of an organelle in a eukaryote.

In addition, P. patens is increasingly used in biotechnology. Examples are the identification of moss genes with implications for crop improvement or human health and the safe production of complex biopharmaceuticals in moss bioreactors. By multiple gene knockout Physcomitrella plants were engineered that lack plant-specific post-translational protein glycosylation. These knockout mosses are used to produce complex biopharmaceuticals in a process called molecular farming.

The genome of P. patens, with about 500 megabase pairs organized into 27 chromosomes, was completely sequenced in 2008.

Physcomitrella ecotypes, mutants, and transgenics are stored and made freely available to the scientific community by the International Moss Stock Center (IMSC). The accession numbers given by the IMSC can be used for publications to ensure safe deposit of newly described moss materials.

Spores of Physcomitrella patens were successfully germinated on Earth, after previously spending 283 days outside of the International Space Station in 2022. The moss has also been successfully grown in both micro and (artificially) increased gravity conditions.

== Lifecycle ==
Like all mosses, the lifecycle of P. patens is characterized by an alternation of two generations: a haploid gametophyte that produces gametes and a diploid sporophyte where haploid spores are produced.

A spore develops into a filamentous structure called protonema, composed of two types of cells – chloronema with large and numerous chloroplasts and caulonema with very fast growth. Protonema filaments grow exclusively by tip growth of their apical cells and can originate side branches from subapical cells. Some side-branch initial cells can differentiate into buds rather than side branches. These buds give rise to gametophores (0.5–5.0 mm), more complex structures bearing leaf-like structures, rhizoids, and the sexual organs: female archegonia and male antheridia. P. patens is monoicous, meaning that male and female organs are produced in the same plant. If water is available, flagellate sperm cells can swim from the antheridia to an archegonium and fertilize the egg within. The resulting diploid zygote develops into a sporophyte composed of a foot, seta, and capsule, where thousands of haploid spores are produced by meiosis.

== DNA repair and homologous recombination ==
P. patens is an excellent model in which to analyze repair of DNA damages in plants by the homologous recombination pathway. Failure to repair double-strand breaks and other DNA damages in somatic cells by homologous recombination can lead to cell dysfunction or death, and when failure occurs during meiosis, it can cause loss of gametes. The genome sequence of P. patens has revealed the presence of numerous genes that encode proteins necessary for repair of DNA damages by homologous recombination and by other pathways. PpRAD51, a protein at the core of the homologous recombination repair reaction, is required to preserve genome integrity in P. patens. Loss of PpRAD51 causes marked hypersensitivity to the double-strand break-inducing agent bleomycin, indicating that homologous recombination is used for repair of somatic cell DNA damages. PpRAD51 is also essential for resistance to ionizing radiation.

The DNA mismatch repair protein PpMSH2 is a central component of the P. patens mismatch repair pathway that targets base pair mismatches arising during homologous recombination. The PpMsh2 gene is necessary in P. patens to preserve genome integrity. Genes Ppmre11 and Pprad50 of P. patens encode components of the MRN complex, the principal sensor of DNA double-strand breaks. These genes are necessary for accurate homologous recombinational repair of DNA damages in P. patens. Mutant plants defective in either Ppmre11 or Pprad50 exhibit severely restricted growth and development (possibly reflecting accelerated senescence), and enhanced sensitivity to UV-B and bleomycin-induced DNA damage compared to wild-type plants.

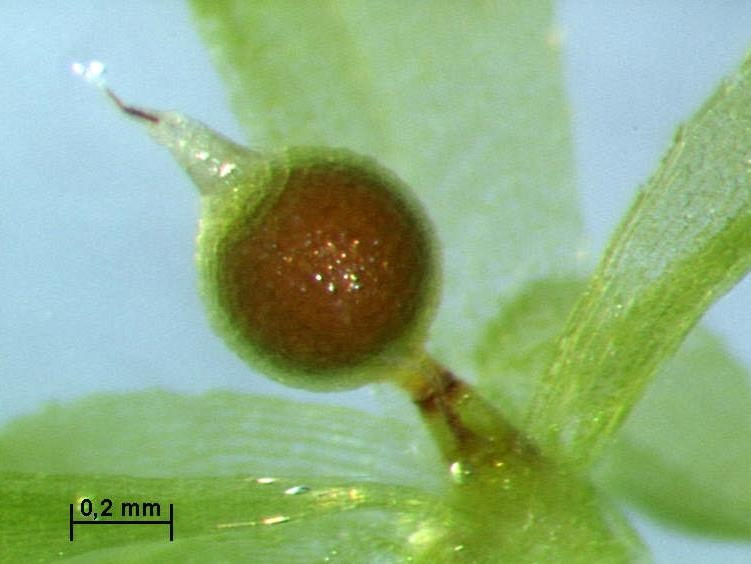
Cleistocarpous sporophyte of the moss P. patens

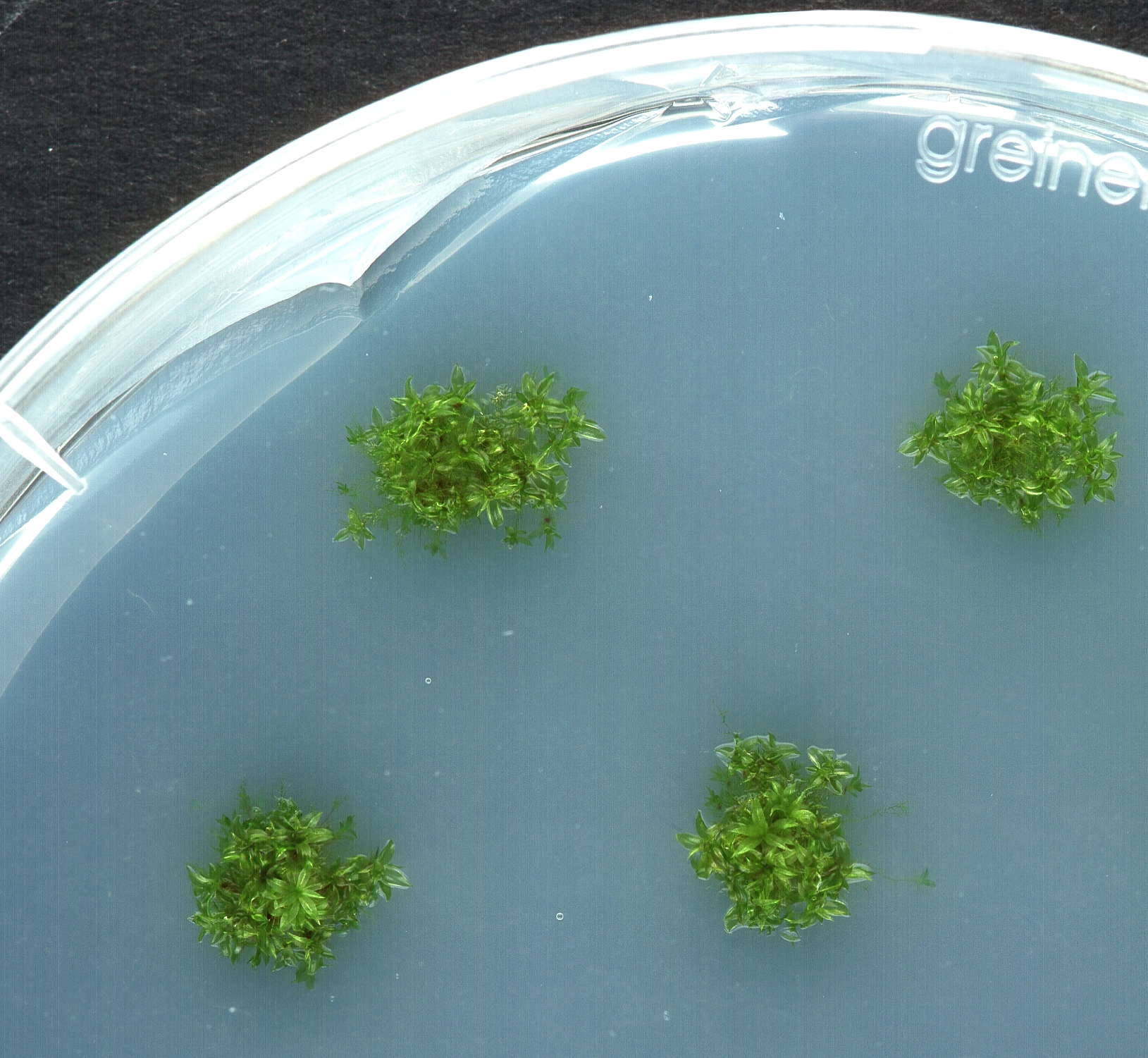
P. patens plants growing axenically in vitro on agar plates (Petri dish, 9 cm diameter)

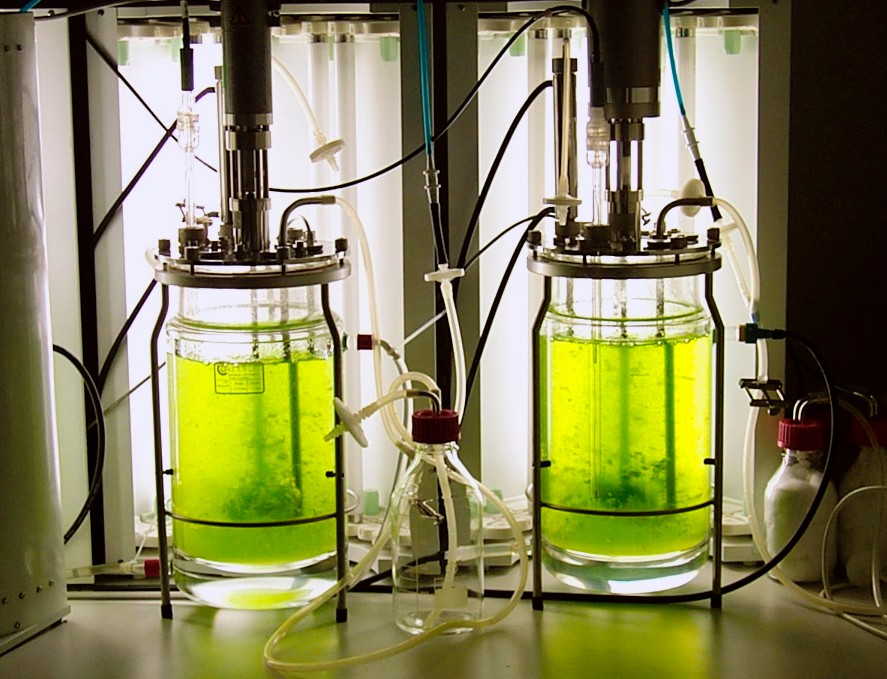
Moss bioreactor with P. patens

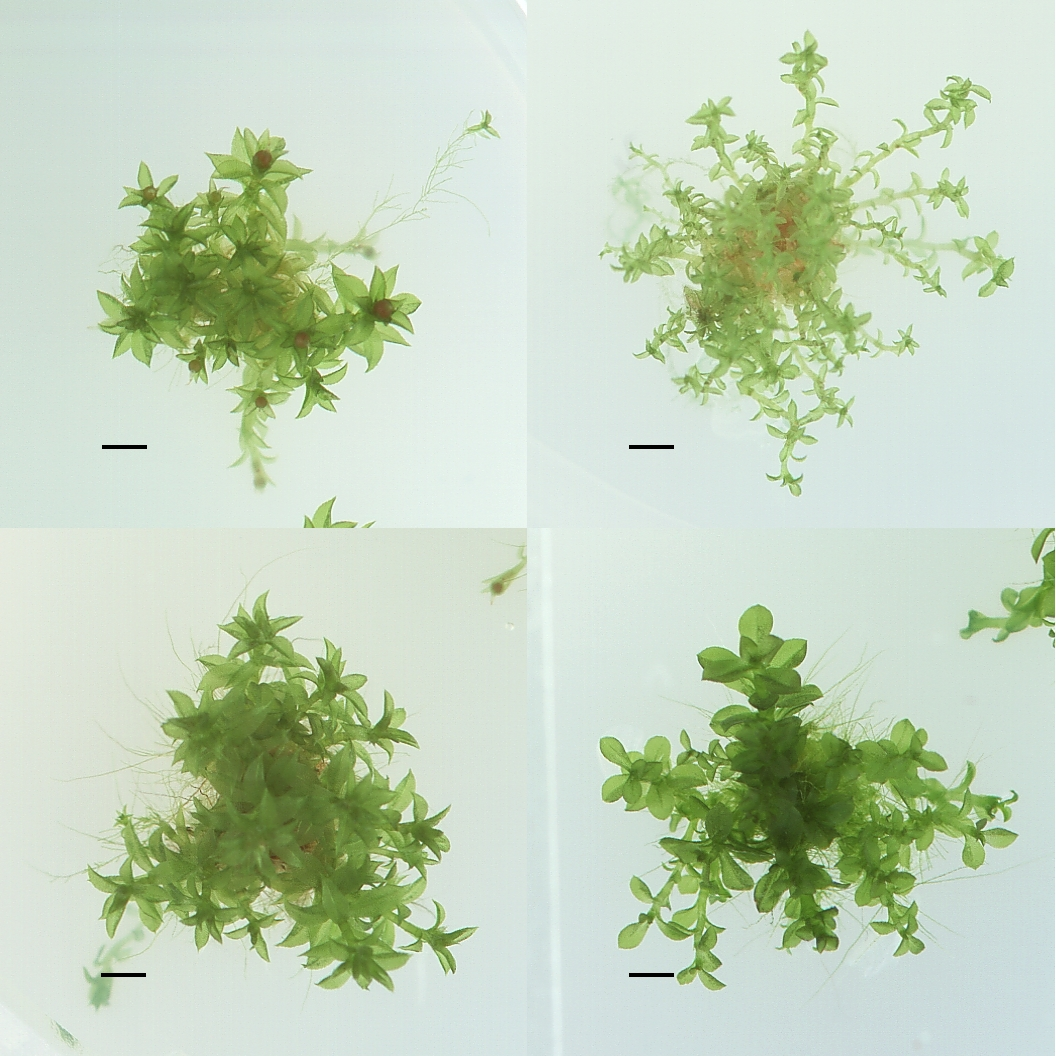
Four different ecotypes of P. patens stored at the International Moss Stock Center

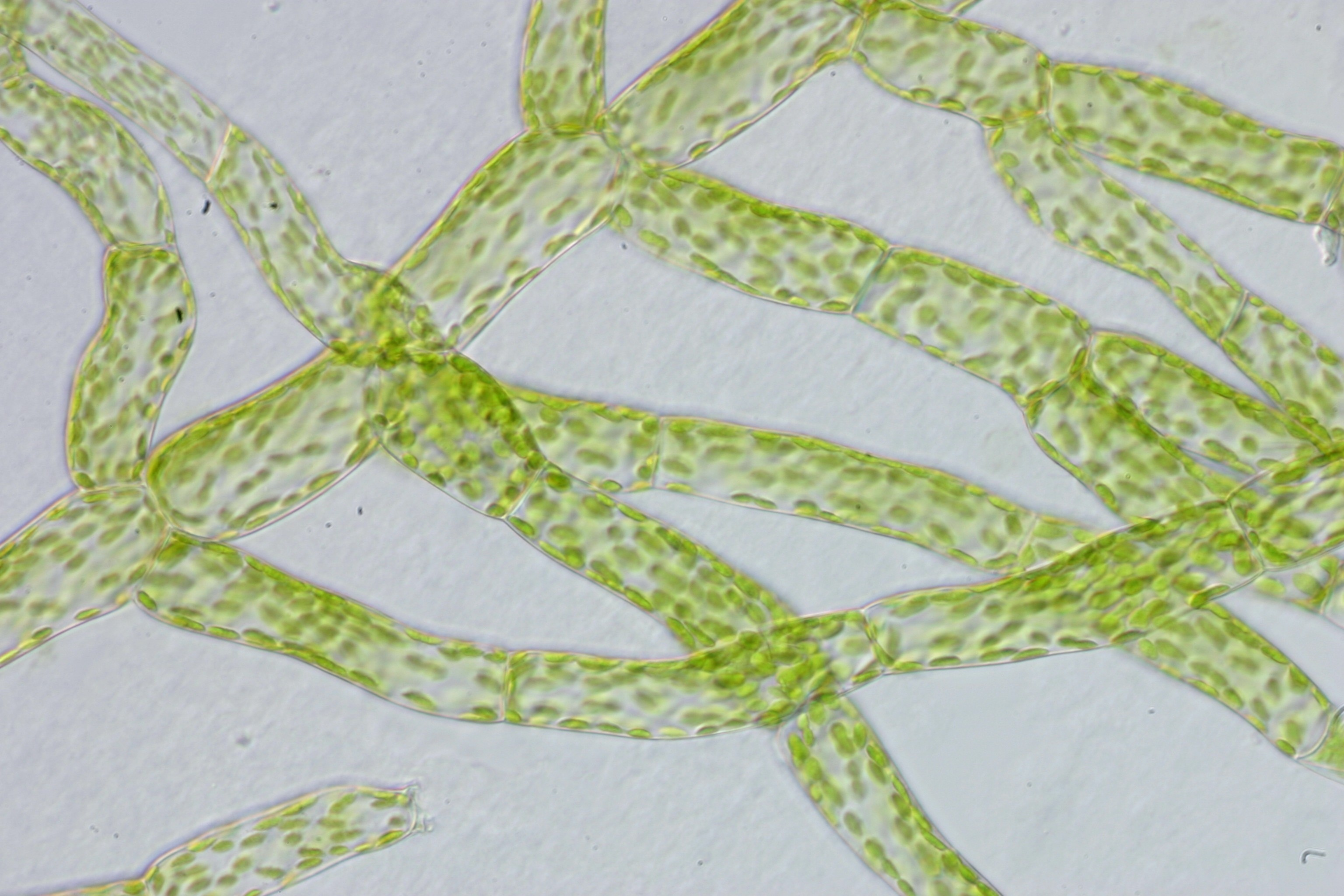
Protonema cells of P. patens

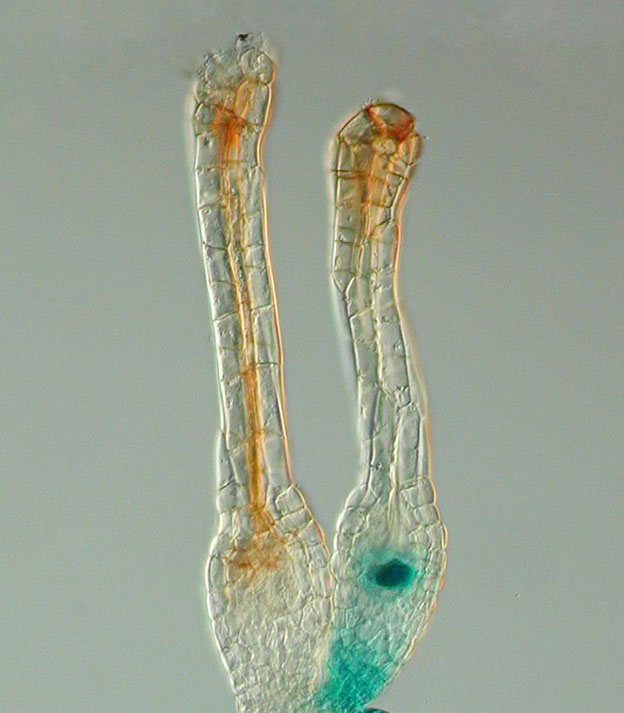
The polycomb gene FIE is expressed (blue) in unfertilised egg cells of the moss P. patens (right) and expression ceases after fertilisation in the developing diploid sporophyte (left). In situ GUS staining of two female sex organs (archegonia) of a transgenic plant expressing a translational fusion of FIE-uidA under control of the native FIE promoter.

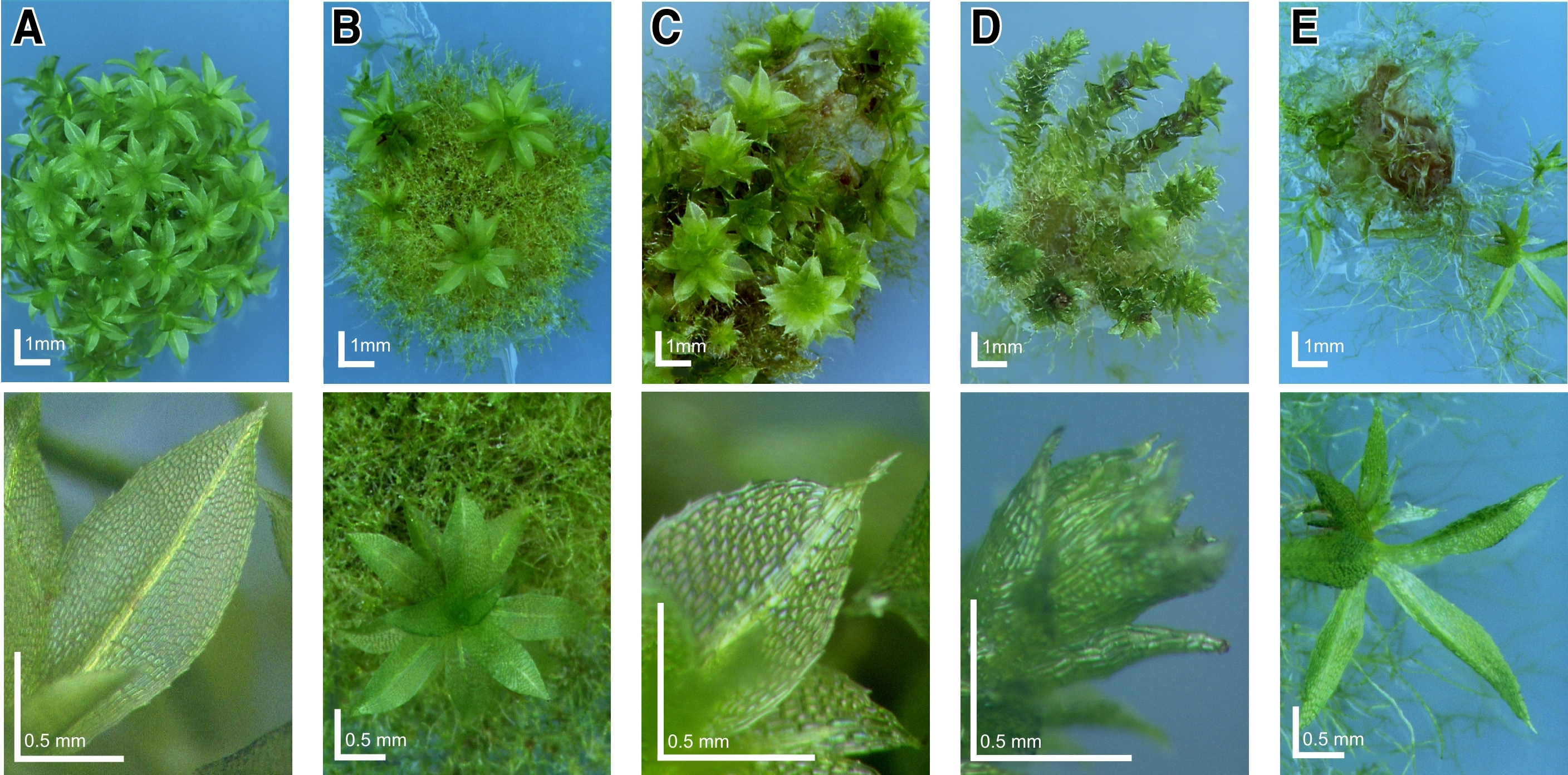
Physcomitrella knockout mutants: Deviating phenotypes induced by transformation with a gene-disruption-library. Physcomitrella wild-type and transformed plants were grown on minimal Knop medium to induce differentiation and development of gametophores. For each plant, an overview (upper row; scale bar corresponds to 1 mm) and a close-up (bottom row; scale bar equals 0.5 mm) are shown. A: Haploid wild-type moss plant completely covered with leafy gametophores and close-up of wild-type leaf. B–E: Different mutants.

== Taxonomy ==
P. patens was first described by Johann Hedwig in his 1801 work Species Muscorum Frondosorum, under the name Phascum patens. Physcomitrella is sometimes treated as a synonym of the genus Aphanorrhegma, in which case P. patens is known as Aphanorrhegma patens. The generic name Physcomitrella implies a resemblance to Physcomitrium, which is named for its large calyptra, unlike that of Physcomitrella. In 2019 it was proposed that the correct name for this moss is Physcomitrium patens.
