= Protonema =

Multicellular filaments forming the early gametophyte of bryophytes

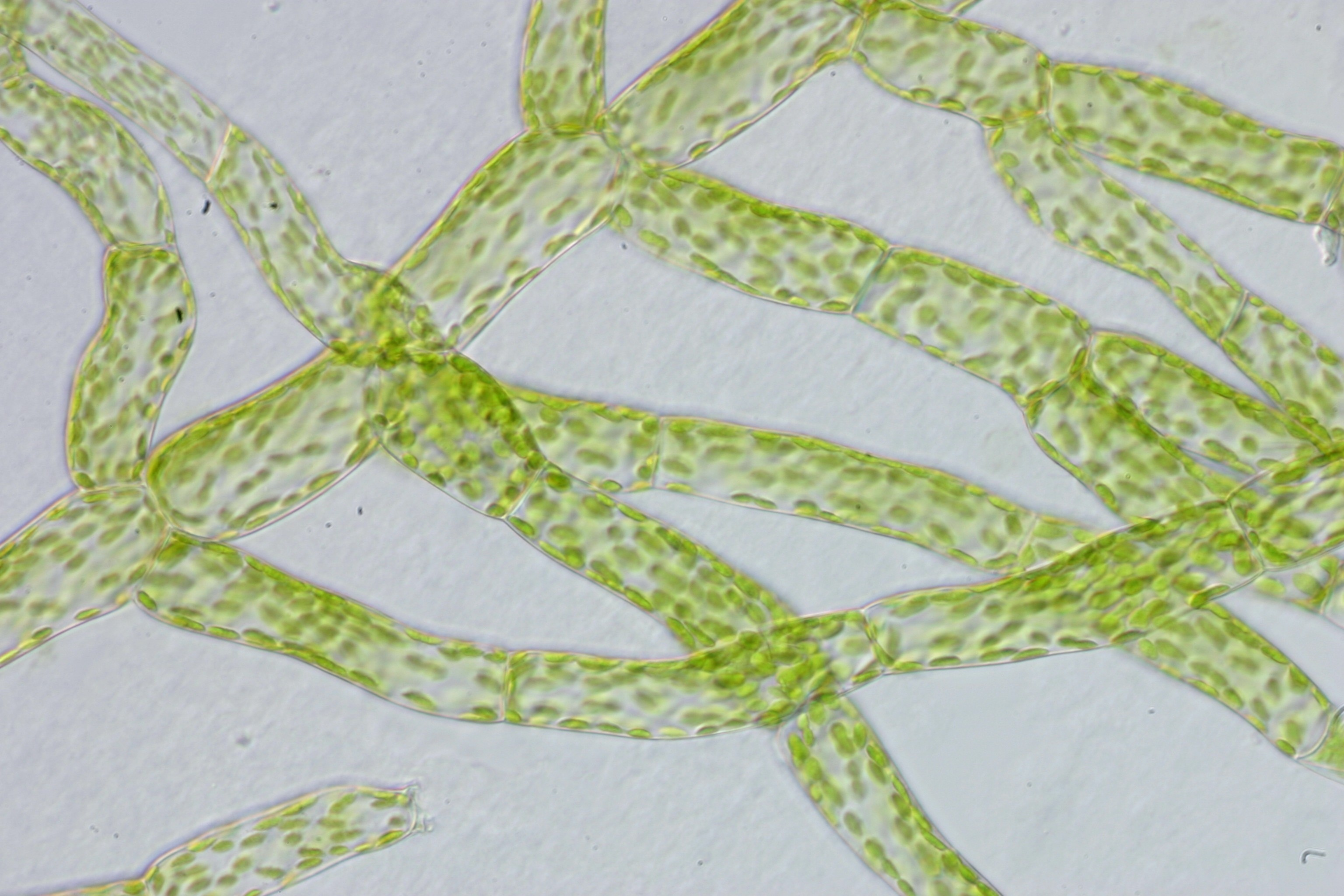
Protonematal cells of the moss Physcomitrella patens

A protonema (plural: protonemata) is a thread-like chain of cells that forms the earliest stage of development of the gametophyte (the haploid phase) in the life cycle of mosses. When a moss first grows from a spore, it starts as a germ tube, which lengthens and branches into a filamentous complex known as a protonema, from which a leafy gametophore, the adult form of a gametophyte in bryophytes, grows. Protonemata are filamentous in mosses, thalloid or globose in liverworts, and globose in hornworts.

== Description ==
The protonemata are composed of two cell types: chloronemata, which form upon germination of the spore, and caulonemata, which later differentiate from chloronemata under the influence of plant hormone auxin. The chloronema cells are visually characterised by the presence of a high number of chloroplasts, relatively short cells, and cross walls (cell walls separating the cells along the filament) that are angled perpendicular to the growth axis. In comparison, caulonema cells are longer, have fewer chloroplasts and have cross walls that are situated at an oblique angle to the growth axis. The transition from chloronema to caulonema cells along a filament is gradual. Later in the development of the plant, caulonema cells can form new branches of chloronema cell type, called secondary chloronema.

The protonema cells grow apically, meaning that the growth of the filament happens by the division of the cells at the tip of branches. This is distinct from the three-faced apical growth of the mature gametophyte, which similarly divides at the tip, but forms three daughter cells. The transition from protonema to mature gametophyte happens with the formation of a bud, a single cell that branches out from the protonema filaments, giving rise to mature gametophytic structures like the stem and leaves. A bud typically forms on caulonema cells triggered by the plant hormone cytokinin (particularly 6-(Δ^{2}isopentenyl)adenine, the native cytokinin of mosses), but they can also form on chloronema if the hormone is present at lower concentrations.
