= Gametophore =

Part of a plant that bears reproductive organs

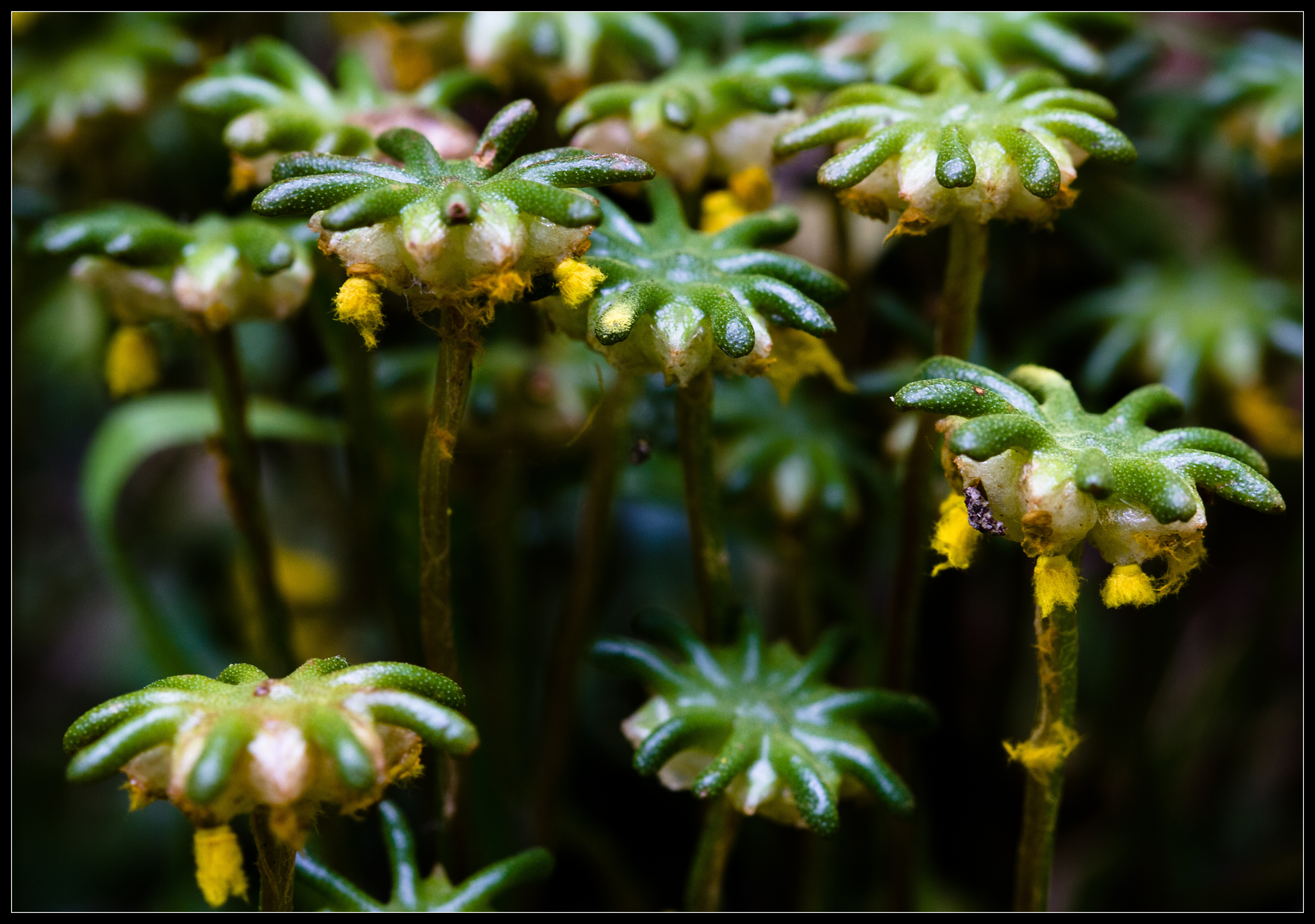
Female gametophytes of the liverwort Marchantia polymorpha

Gametophores are prominent structures in seedless plants on which the reproductive organs are borne. The word gametophore (more accurately gametangiophore) is composed of the greek ‘gamete-,’ referring (loosely) to gametangia and ‘-phore’ (Greek Φορά, "to be carried"). In mosses, liverworts and ferns (Archegoniata), the gametophores support gametangia (sex organs, female archegonia and male antheridia). If both archegonia and antheridia occur on the same plant, it is called monoicious. If there are separate female and male plants they are called dioicious.

In Bryopsida the leafy moss plant (q. v. "Thallus") is the haploid gametophyte. It grows from its juvenile form, the protonema, under the influence of phytohormones (mainly cytokinins). Whereas the filamentous protonema grows by apical cell division, the gametophyte grows by division of three-faced apical cells.
