= Philip L. Townes =

Dr. Philip L. Townes
- Born: February 18, 1927; Salem, Massachusetts
- Died: April 1, 2017 (aged 90); Worcester, Massachusetts
- Education: Harvard University, 1948 (AB), University of Rochester, 1953 (PhD), 1959 (MD)
- Occupations: Physician (pediatrics), human geneticist, embryologist, developmental biologist
- Years active: 1952–1995
- Known for: Differential adhesion hypothesis, Townes–Brocks syndrome, Trypsinogen deficiency disease
- Notable work: Directed movements and selective adhesion of embryonic amphibian cells. (1955). J. Exp. Zool. Hereditary syndrome of imperforate anus with hand, foot, and ear anomalies. (1972). J. Pediatr Trypsinogen deficiency disease. (1965). J. Pediatr.
- Spouse: Marjorie G. Townes

Philip Leonard Townes (February 18, 1927 – April 1, 2017) was an American physician, human geneticist, embryologist and developmental biologist who identified Townes–Brocks syndrome (along with Eric Brocks) in 1972 while a Professor of Pediatrics at the University of Rochester.

As a graduate student, his pioneering work with Johannes Holtfreter served as the basis for the differential adhesion hypothesis that explains cellular movement and differentiation during morphogenesis.

In 1965, he described the first patient with isolated pancreatic trypsinogen deficiency, an inborn error of metabolism, that became known as trypsinogen deficiency disease.

== Early life and education ==
Philip Leonard 'Len' Townes was born February 18, 1927, in Salem, Massachusetts to Saul and Lillian (Kravetsky) Townes. He graduated from Salem High School and served in the United States Navy during World War II. He attended Harvard University, earning an AB in 1948. He went on to the University of Rochester, earning a PhD from the Department of Biology in 1953 under the mentorship of Johannes Holtfreter, and earning an MD in 1959. He completed his residency training in pediatrics at the University of Rochester in 1964 and served as Chief Resident in 1965.

== Research ==
As a graduate student working in the laboratory of Johannes Holtfreter, Townes pioneered a technique for studying the kinetic and morphogenetic phenomena, subsequent to the combination of two or more well defined cell types, that revolutionized the understanding of morphogenesis, and serves as the basis for the differential adhesion hypothesis. With this technique, areas of embryonic tissue (mostly cell layers from amphibian neurulae) were teased from the embryos with glass needles. Once separated they could be recombined with one another. This demonstrated that in the process of sorting out, the different cell types exhibited a cell-specific tendency to arrange themselves in a definite tissue pattern that corresponded to that in normal development. The work was published as Townes' thesis in the classic paper in embryology and developmental biology, 'Directed movements and selective adhesion of embryonic amphibian cells' in 1955 in the J. Exp. Zool. 128:53-120.

== Medical career ==
Townes was a member of the faculty at the University of Rochester in the Departments of Anatomy and Pediatrics from 1952 to 1979. He was named Professor of Pediatrics in 1966 and served as the Chairman of the Division of Genetics and Director of the Genetic Clinic from 1966 to 1979. He served as an honorary research assistant at the University College, London, England between 1965 and 1966.

In 1965, Townes described the first patient with isolated trypsinogen deficiency with secondary lack of activation of chymotrypsin and procarboxypeptidase. The 6-week-old infant was unable to hydrolyze dietary protein due to a singular deficiency of pancreatic trypsinogen. This inborn error of metabolism, resulting in failure to thrive, became known as trypsinogen deficiency disease.

In 1972, he identified a rare inherited syndrome in a father and four of his six children, characterized by the triad of imperforate anus, dysplastic ears, and thumb malformations, subsequently known as Townes–Brocks syndrome. Townes-Brocks syndrome was later found to be caused by a mutation in the SALL1 gene on chromosome 16q12.1.

Townes was a member of the faculty and Professor of Pediatrics and Obstetrics and Gynecology at the University of Massachusetts Medical School from 1979 to 1995 where he directed the Genetic Clinic and the Cytogenetics Laboratory. In 1995 he retired to become an emeritus Professor of Pediatrics and Obstetrics and Gynecology.
