= Walter Vogt =

Walter Vogt may refer to:

- Walter Vogt (embryologist) (1888–1941), German embryologist
- Walter Vogt (politician) (born 1947), Liechtenstein carpenter and politician

== See also ==
- Walter Voigt (1895–1937), American football player
- Walter Voit (fl. 2000s–2020s), American professor of materials science and engineering
