= Morphogenesis =

Biological process that causes an organism to develop its shape

Morphogenesis (from the Greek morphê shape and genesis creation, literally "the generation of form") is the biological process that causes a cell, tissue, or organism to develop its shape. It is one of three fundamental aspects of developmental biology, along with the control of tissue growth and the patterning of cellular differentiation.

The process controls the organized spatial distribution of cells during the embryonic development of an organism. Morphogenesis can take place also in a mature organism, such as in the normal maintenance of tissue by stem cells or in regeneration of tissues after damage. Cancer is an example of a pathological process of tissue morphogenesis, characterized by significant abnormalities. Morphogenesis also describes the development of unicellular life forms that do not have an embryonic stage in their life cycle. Morphogenesis is essential for the evolution of new forms.

Morphogenesis is a mechanical process involving forces that generate mechanical stress, strain, and movement of cells. This process can be induced by genetic programs according to the spatial patterning of cells within tissues. Abnormal morphogenesis is called dysmorphogenesis.

== History ==
Some of the earliest ideas and mathematical descriptions on how physical processes and constraints affect biological growth, and hence natural patterns such as the spirals of phyllotaxis, were written by D'Arcy Wentworth Thompson in his 1917 book On Growth and Form (Note: Thompson's book is often cited. An abridged version, comprising 349 pages, remains in print and readily obtainable. An unabridged version, comprising 1116 pages, has also been published.) and Alan Turing in his The Chemical Basis of Morphogenesis (1952). Where Thompson explained animal body shapes as being created by varying rates of growth in different directions, for instance to create the spiral shell of a snail, Turing correctly predicted a mechanism of morphogenesis, the diffusion of two different chemical signals, one activating and one deactivating growth, to set up patterns of development, decades before the formation of such patterns was observed. The fuller understanding of the mechanisms involved in actual organisms required the discovery of the structure of DNA in 1953, and the development of molecular biology and biochemistry.

== Genetic and molecular basis ==
Morphogenesis is controlled by a "toolkit" of genes which switch development on and off at precise times and places. Here, gap genes in the fruit fly are switched on by genes such as bicoid, setting up stripes which create the body's segmental form.

Several types of molecules are important in morphogenesis. Morphogens are soluble molecules that can diffuse and carry signals that control cell differentiation via concentration gradients. Morphogens typically act through binding to specific protein receptors. An important class of molecules involved in morphogenesis are transcription factor proteins that determine the fate of cells by interacting with DNA. These can be coded for by master regulatory genes, and either activate or deactivate the transcription of other genes; in turn, these secondary gene products can regulate the expression of still other genes in a regulatory cascade of gene regulatory networks. At the end of this cascade are classes of molecules that control cellular behaviors such as cell migration, or, more generally, their properties, such as cell adhesion or cell contractility. For example, during gastrulation, clumps of stem cells switch off their cell-to-cell adhesion, become migratory, and take up new positions within an embryo where they again activate specific cell adhesion proteins and form new tissues and organs. Developmental signaling pathways implicated in morphogenesis include Wnt, Hedgehog, and ephrins.

== Cellular basis ==
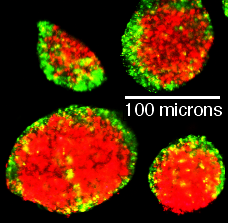
Cell sorting out with cultured P19 embryonal carcinoma cells. Live cells were stained with DiI (red) or DiO (green). The red cells were genetically altered and express higher levels of E-cadherin than the green cells. The mixed culture forms large multi-cellular aggregates.

At a tissue level, ignoring the means of control, morphogenesis arises because of cellular proliferation and motility. Morphogenesis also involves changes in the cellular structure or how cells interact in tissues. These changes can result in tissue elongation, thinning, folding, invasion or separation of one tissue into distinct layers. The latter case is often referred as cell sorting. Cell "sorting out" consists of cells moving so as to sort into clusters that maximize contact between cells of the same type. The ability of cells to do this has been proposed to arise from differential cell adhesion by Malcolm Steinberg through his differential adhesion hypothesis. Tissue separation can also occur via more dramatic cellular differentiation events during which epithelial cells become mesenchymal (see Epithelial–mesenchymal transition). Mesenchymal cells typically leave the epithelial tissue as a consequence of changes in cell adhesive and contractile properties. Following epithelial-mesenchymal transition, cells can migrate away from an epithelium and then associate with other similar cells in a new location. In plants, cellular morphogenesis is tightly linked to the chemical composition and the mechanical properties of the cell wall.

=== Cell-to-cell adhesion ===
During embryonic development, cells are restricted to different layers due to differential affinities. One of the ways this can occur is when cells share the same cell-to-cell adhesion molecules. For instance, homotypic cell adhesion can maintain boundaries between groups of cells that have different adhesion molecules. Furthermore, cells can sort based upon differences in adhesion between the cells, so even two populations of cells with different levels of the same adhesion molecule can sort out. In cell culture cells that have the strongest adhesion move to the center of a mixed aggregates of cells. Moreover, cell-cell adhesion is often modulated by cell contractility, which can exert forces on the cell-cell contacts so that two cell populations with equal levels of the same adhesion molecule can sort out. The molecules responsible for adhesion are called cell adhesion molecules (CAMs). Several types of cell adhesion molecules are known and one major class of these molecules are cadherins. There are dozens of different cadherins that are expressed on different cell types. Cadherins bind to other cadherins in a like-to-like manner: E-cadherin (found on many epithelial cells) binds preferentially to other E-cadherin molecules. Mesenchymal cells usually express other cadherin types such as N-cadherin.

=== Extracellular matrix ===
The extracellular matrix (ECM) is involved in keeping tissues separated, providing structural support or providing a structure for cells to migrate on. Collagen, laminin, and fibronectin are major ECM molecules that are secreted and assembled into sheets, fibers, and gels. Multisubunit transmembrane receptors called integrins are used to bind to the ECM. Integrins bind extracellularly to fibronectin, laminin, or other ECM components, and intracellularly to microfilament-binding proteins α-actinin and talin to link the cytoskeleton with the outside. Integrins also serve as receptors to trigger signal transduction cascades when binding to the ECM. A well-studied example of morphogenesis that involves ECM is mammary gland ductal branching.

=== Cell contractility ===
Tissues can change their shape and separate into distinct layers via cell contractility. Just as in muscle cells, myosin can contract different parts of the cytoplasm to change its shape or structure. Myosin-driven contractility in embryonic tissue morphogenesis is seen during the separation of germ layers in the model organisms Caenorhabditis elegans, Drosophila and zebrafish. There are often periodic pulses of contraction in embryonic morphogenesis. A model called the cell state splitter involves alternating cell contraction and expansion, initiated by a bistable organelle at the apical end of each cell. The organelle consists of microtubules and microfilaments in mechanical opposition. It responds to local mechanical perturbations caused by morphogenetic movements. These then trigger traveling embryonic differentiation waves of contraction or expansion over presumptive tissues that determine cell type and is followed by cell differentiation. The cell state splitter was first proposed to explain neural plate morphogenesis during gastrulation of the axolotl and the model was later generalized to all of morphogenesis.

=== Branching morphogenesis ===
In the development of the lung a bronchus branches into bronchioles forming the respiratory tree. The branching is a result of the tip of each bronchiolar tube bifurcating, and the process of branching morphogenesis forms the bronchi, bronchioles, and ultimately the alveoli.

Branching morphogenesis is also evident in the ductal formation of the mammary gland. Primitive duct formation begins in development, but the branching formation of the duct system begins later in response to estrogen during puberty and is further refined in line with mammary gland development.

== Cancer morphogenesis ==
Cancer can result from disruption of normal morphogenesis, including both tumor formation and tumor metastasis. Mitochondrial dysfunction can result in increased cancer risk due to disturbed morphogen signaling.

== Virus morphogenesis ==
During assembly of the bacteriophage (phage) T4 virion, the morphogenetic proteins encoded by the phage genes interact with each other in a characteristic sequence. Maintaining an appropriate balance in the amounts of each of these proteins produced during viral infection appears to be critical for normal phage T4 morphogenesis. Phage T4 encoded proteins that determine virion structure include major structural components, minor structural components and non-structural proteins that catalyze specific steps in the morphogenesis sequence. Phage T4 morphogenesis is divided into three independent pathways: the head, the tail and the long tail fibres as detailed by Yap and Rossman.

== Computer models ==
An approach to model morphogenesis in computer science or mathematics can be traced to Alan Turing's 1952 paper, "The chemical basis of morphogenesis", a model now known as the Turing pattern.

Another famous model is the so-called French flag model, developed in the sixties.

Improvements in computer performance in the twenty-first century enabled the simulation of relatively complex morphogenesis models. In 2020, such a model was proposed where cell growth and differentiation is that of a cellular automaton with parametrized rules. As the rules' parameters are differentiable, they can be trained with gradient descent, a technique which has been highly optimized in recent years due to its use in machine learning. This model was limited to the generation of pictures, and is thus bi-dimensional.

A similar model to the one described above was subsequently extended to generate three-dimensional structures, and was demonstrated in the video game Minecraft, whose block-based nature made it particularly expedient for the simulation of 3D cellular automatons.

== See also ==
- Bone morphogenetic protein
- Collective cell migration
- Embryonic development
- Pattern formation
- Reaction–diffusion system
- Neurulation
- Gastrulation
- Axon guidance
- Eye development
- Polycystic kidney disease 2
- Drosophila embryogenesis
- Cytoplasmic determinant
- Madin-Darby Canine Kidney cells
- Bioelectricity#Role in pattern regulation
- Morphogenetic field
