= Differential adhesion hypothesis =

Differential adhesion hypothesis (DAH) is a hypothesis that explains cellular movement during morphogenesis with thermodynamic principles. In DAH tissues are treated as liquids consisting of mobile cells whose varying degrees of surface adhesion cause them to reorganize spontaneously to minimize their interfacial free energy. Put another way, according to DAH, cells move to be near other cells of similar adhesive strength in order to maximize the bonding strength between cells and produce a more thermodynamically stable structure. In this way the movement of cells during tissue formation, according to DAH, parodies the behavior of a mixture of liquids. Although originally motivated by the problem of understanding cell sorting behavior in vertebrate embryos, DAH has subsequently been applied to explain several other morphogenic phenomena.

== Background ==
The origins of DAH can be traced back to a 1955 study by Philip L. Townes and Johannes Holtfreter. In this study Townes and Holtfreter placed the three germ layers of an amphibian into an alkaline solution, allowing them to dissociate into individual cells, and mixed these different types of cells together. Cells of different species were used to be able to visually observe and follow their movements. Cells of similar types migrated to their correct location and reaggregated to form germ layers in their developmentally correct positions. This experiment demonstrated that tissue organization can occur independent of the path taken, implying that it is mediated by forces that are persistently present and doesn't arise solely from the chronological sequence of developmental events preceding it.

From these results Holtfreter developed his concept of selective affinity, and hypothesized that well-timed changes to selective affinity of cells to one another throughout development guided morphogenesis. Several hypotheses were introduced to explain these results including the "timing hypothesis" and the "differential surface contraction hypothesis". In 1964 Malcolm Steinberg introduced the "differential adhesion hypothesis" which uses thermodynamic principles to describe and explain patterns of cell sorting and arrangement observed.

== Overview ==
According to DAH, cellular movement and assortment is governed by the spontaneous rearrangement of cells—in much the same way as a liquid—to a more thermodynamically stable equilibrium. This is achieved by maximizing the amount of energy that is utilized adhering the cells together, which decreases the free energy available in the system. As cells with similar strengths of surface adhesion bond to one another, bonding energy in the overall system increases, and interfacial free energy decreases causing the system to be more thermodynamically stable. Liquids behave in a comparable manner, but with molecules moving around due to kinetic energy instead of motile cells moving around due to a combination of their kinetics and active movement.

This allows examples of tissue arrangement to be corresponded to the behavior of liquids, such as one tissue spreading across another being corresponded to oil spreading across water; the oil spreads across the water to minimize weak oil-water interactions and maximize stronger water-water and oil-oil interactions, the cells similarly sort themselves to be near other cells of similar adhesive strength and bond with them. Other tissue interactions that DAH offers an explanation for includes tissue hierarchy, where tissues with weaker surface adhesion surround tissues with stronger surface adhesion, the rounding of irregular cell masses to become spherical, and the cell sorting and construction of anatomical structures that occurs independent of the path taken.

DAH does not rely on qualitative differences in cell adhesion, only on quantitative differences in the strength of their surface adhesion. DAH has been supported experimentally and by computational models.

== Applications ==
Since its original formulation in the context of vertebrate embryogenesis, DAH has been utilized to offer an explanation for several other morphogenic phenomena including wound healing, and epithelial-mesenchymal transition in cancer progression and metastasis.

== See also ==
- Cell sorting
- Cell adhesion
- Morphogenesis
- Wound healing
- Metastasis
