= Gestalt =

Gestalt (/ɡəˈʃtælt, -ˈʃtɑːlt/ gə-SHTA(H)LT; German: [ɡəˈʃtalt]; meaning "form") may refer to:

== Psychology ==
- Gestalt psychology, a school of psychology
- Gestalt therapy, a form of psychotherapy

== Arts and media ==
- Gestalt (album), a 2012 album by the Spill Canvas
- Gestalt (manga), a manga series by Yun Kōga
- Gestalt et Jive, a rock group from West Germany
- Gestalt intelligence, or group mind, a science fiction plot device
- Gestalt Publishing, an Australian publishing house
- Gestalt, the name for humans in the video game Signalis

== Other uses ==
- GESTALT, method of genetic lineage tracing
