= Cell lineage =

Developmental history of a tissue or organ

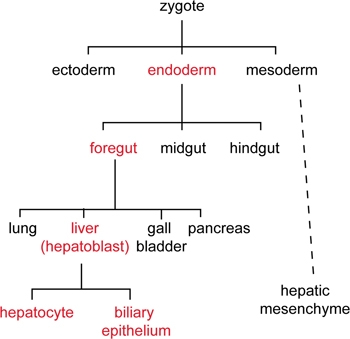
General stages of cell lineage (cell lineage of liver development in red)

Cell lineage denotes the developmental history of a tissue or organ from the fertilized egg. This is based on the tracking of an organism's cellular ancestry due to the cell divisions and relocation as time progresses. This starts with the originator cells and finishes with a mature cell that can no longer divide.

This type of lineage can be studied by marking a cell (with fluorescent molecules or other traceable markers) and following its progeny after cell division. Some organisms, such as C. elegans, have a predetermined pattern of cell progeny and the adult male will always consist of 1031 cells. This is because cell division in C. elegans is genetically determined and known as eutely. This causes the cell lineage and cell fate to be highly correlated. Other organisms, such as humans, have variable lineages and somatic cell numbers.

== C. elegans: model organism ==
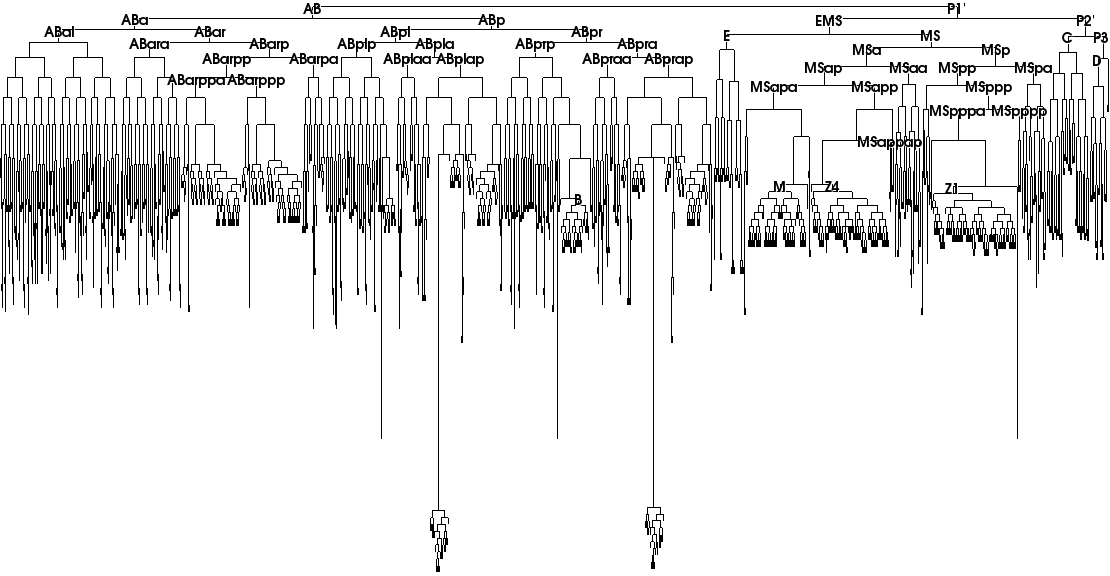
The complete cell lineage of C. elegans

As one of the first pioneers of cell lineage, in the 1960s, Dr. Sydney Brenner first began observing cell differentiation and succession in the nematode Caenorhabditis elegans. Dr. Brenner chose this organism due to its transparent body, quick reproduction, ease of access, and small size, which made it ideal for following cell lineage under a microscope.

By 1976, Dr. Brenner and his associate, Dr. John Sulston, had identified part of the cell lineage in the developing nervous system of C. elegans. Initial results showed that the nematode was eutelic (each individual experiences the same differentiation pathways). However, work by Sulston and Richard Horvitz showed that several cells necessary for reproduction differentiate after hatching. These cells include vulval cells as well as muscle and neurons. This research also led to the initial observations of programmed cell death, or apoptosis.

After mapping various sections of the C. elegans' cell lineage, Dr. Brenner and his associates were able to piece together the first complete and reproducible fate map of cell lineage. They later received the 2002 Nobel prize for their work in genetic regulation of organ development and programmed cell death. Being that C. elegans are hermaphrodites, there consist of both male and female organs, where they store sperm and are able to self fertilize. C. elegans contain 302 neurons and 959 somatic cells, where they begin with 1031, where 72 undergo apoptosis, which is programmed cell death. This makes C. elegans a model organism for studying cell lineage, and being able to observe the cell divisions due to their transparent phenotype.

== History of cell lineage ==
One of the first studies of cell lineages took place in the 1870s by Whitman, who studied cleavage patterns in leeches and small invertebrates. He found that some groups, such as nematode worms and ascidians form a pattern of cell division which is identical between individuals and invariable. This high correlation between cell lineage and cell fate was thought to be determined by segregating factors within the dividing cells. Other organisms had stereotyped patterns of cell division and produced sublineages which were the progeny of particular precursor cells. These more variable cell fates are thought to be due to the cells' interaction with the environment. Due to new breakthroughs in tracking cells with greater accuracy, this aided the biological community since a variety of colors are now used in showing the original cells and able to track easily. These colors are fluorescent and marked on the proteins by administering injections to trace such cells.

== Techniques of fate mapping ==
Cell lineage can be determined by two methods, either through direct observation or through clonal analysis. During the early 19th century, direct observation was used, but it was highly limiting as only small transparent samples can be studied. The invention of the confocal microscope allowed larger, more complex organisms to be studied.

Perhaps the most popular method of cell fate mapping in the genetic era is through site-specific recombination mediated by the Cre-Lox or FLP-FRT systems. By using the Cre-Lox or FLP-FRT recombination systems, a reporter gene (usually encoding a fluorescent protein) is activated and permanently labels the cell of interest and its offspring cells, thus the name cell lineage tracing. With the system, researchers could investigate the function of their favorite gene in determining cell fate by designing a genetic model where within a cell one recombination event is designed for manipulating the gene of interest and the other recombination event is designed for activating a reporter gene. One minor issue is that the two recombination events may not occur simultaneously; thus the results need to be interpreted with caution. Furthermore, some fluorescent reporters have such an extremely low recombination threshold that they may label cell populations at undesired time-points in the absence of induction.

Synthetic biology approaches and the CRISPR/Cas9 system to engineer new genetic systems that enable cells to autonomously record lineage information in their own genome have been developed. These systems are based on engineered, targeted mutation of defined genetic elements. By generating new, random genomic alterations in each cell generation, these approaches facilitate reconstruction of lineage trees. These approaches promise to provide more comprehensive analysis of lineage relationships in model organisms. Computational tree reconstruction methods are also being developed for datasets generated by such approaches.

== Early developmental asymmetries ==
In humans after fertilization, the zygote divides into two cells. Somatic mutations that arise directly after the formation of the zygote, as well as later in development, can be used as markers to trace cell lineages throughout the body. Beginning with cleavages of the zygote, lineages were observed to contribute unequally to blood cells. As much as 90% of blood cells were found to be derived from just one of the first two blastomeres. In addition, normal development may result in unequal characteristics of symmetrical organs, such as between the left and right frontal and occipital cerebral cortex. It was proposed that the efficiency of DNA repair contributes to lineage imbalance, as additional time spent by a cell on DNA repair may decrease proliferation rate.

== See also ==
- Cell potency
- Genome editing of synthetic target arrays for lineage tracing (GESTALT)
