= Townes–Brocks syndrome =

- This condition is inherited in an autosomal dominant manner
- Specialty: Medical genetics

Townes–Brocks syndrome (TBS) is a rare genetic disease that has been described in approximately 200 cases in the published literature. It affects both males and females equally. The condition was first identified in 1972. It was identified by Philip L. Townes, who was at the time a human geneticists and Professor of Pediatrics, and Eric Brocks, who was at the time a medical student, both at the University of Rochester.

== Signs and symptoms ==
TBS patients may have the following symptoms:

- Abnormalities of the external ears (unusually large or small, unusually shaped, sometimes with sensorineural hearing loss or deafness due to lesions or dysfunctions of part of the internal ear or its nerve tracts and centers or conductive hearing loss from the external or middle ear), dysplastic ears, lop ear (over-folded ear helix), preauricular tags or pits (a rudimentary tag of ear tissue typically located just in front of the ear).
- Anorectal malformations, including imperforate anus/absence of an anal opening, rectovaginal fistula, anal stenosis, unusually placed anus.
- Kidney abnormalities, sometimes leading to impaired kidney function or kidney failure, including hypoplastic kidneys (underdeveloped), multicystic kidneys, dysplastic kidneys.
- Heart abnormalities, including tetralogy of fallot and defects of the ventricular septum.
- Hand and foot abnormalities, such as hypoplastic thumbs, fingerlike thumbs, syndactyly (webbed fingers/toes), fusion of the wrist bones, overlapping foot and/or toe bones.

Learning difficulties have been reported in some children with TBS. For others, intelligence is within the normal range.

These abnormalities, which are present prenatally, can range from minor to severe, and as with similar disorders, most individuals with this condition have some, but not all, of these traits.

== Causes ==
TBS is an autosomal dominant involving the a mutation of the gene SALL1, which encodes a transcriptional repressor which interacts with TRF1/PIN2 and localizes to pericentromeric heterochromatin. The clinical features of TBS overlap with VATER and VACTERL associations, oculo-auriculo-vertebral (OAV) spectrum, branchio-oto-renal (BOR) syndrome, and Fanconi anemia and other 'anus-hand-ear' syndromes.

Although some symptoms can be life-threatening, many people diagnosed with Townes-Brocks Syndrome live a normal lifespan.
