= Holtfreter's solution =

Salt solution used in biology

Holtfreter's solution (Holtfreter's medium) is a balanced salt solution that was developed by the developmental biologist Johannes Holtfreter for studying amphibian embryos and to reduce bacterial infections. As a specialised aqueous solution, it finds use in aquaria to prevent infections for early stage amphibians, where it is typically mixed with soft tap water. Amphibians such as axolotls prefer a hard water solution.

== Composition ==
Molarity of the component salts are as follows:

NaCl	0.059 M
KCl	0.00067 M
CaCl_{2}	0.00076 M
NaHCO_{3}	0.0024 M

== Notes ==
- https://www.msu.edu/user/eisthen/lab/methods/animalcare/holtfr.html [link now dead]
