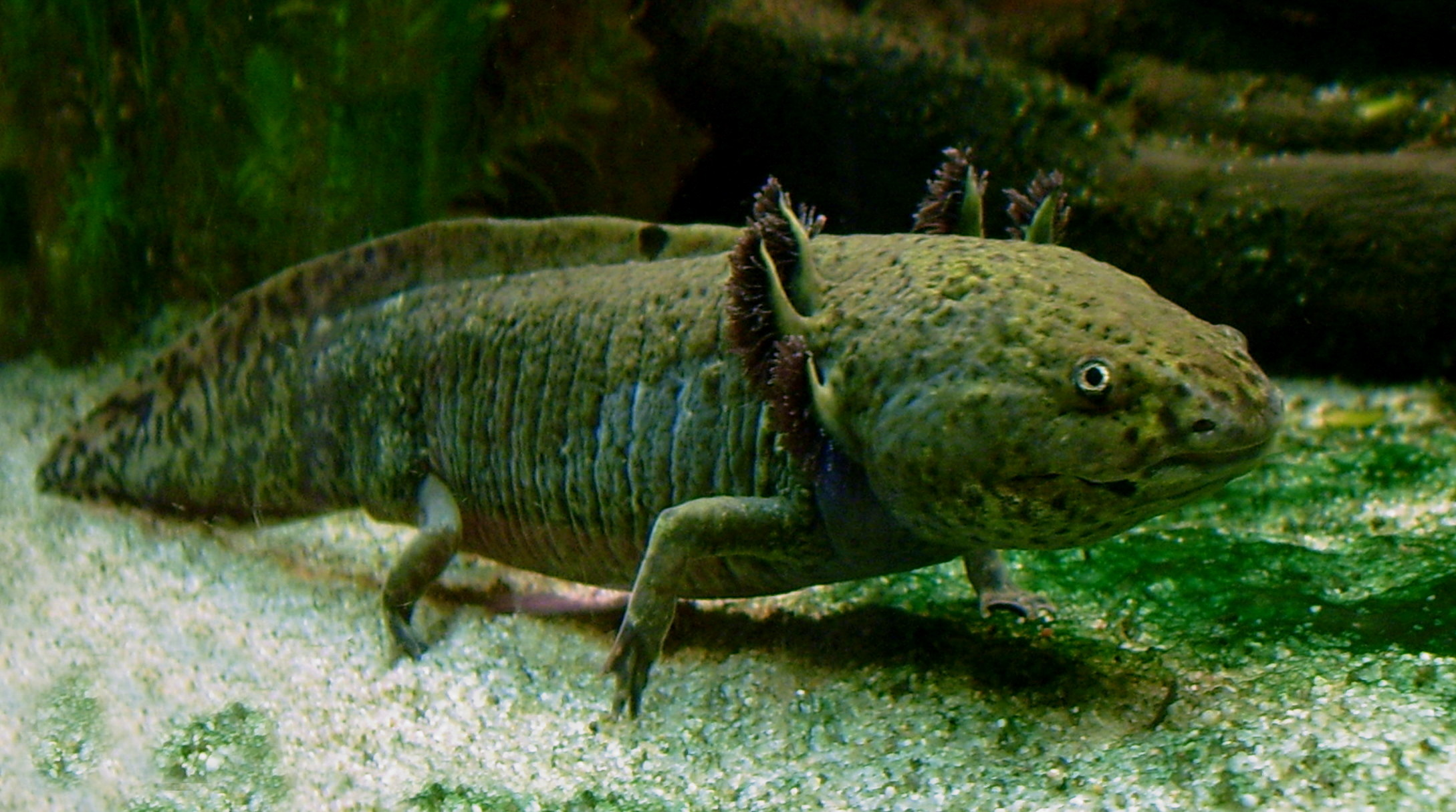
- Wild type axolotl

Conservation status
- Critically Endangered (IUCN 3.1)
- CITES Appendix II

Scientific classification
- Kingdom: Animalia
- Phylum: Chordata
- Class: Amphibia
- Order: Urodela
- Family: Ambystomatidae
- Genus: Ambystoma
- Species: A. mexicanum

Binomial name
- Ambystoma mexicanum (Shaw and Nodder, 1798)
- IUCN range of the axolotl Axolotl (Ambystoma mexicanum)

Synonyms
- Gyrinus mexicanus Shaw and Nodder, 1798; Siren pisciformis Shaw, 1802; Siredon axolotl Wagler, 1830; Axolotes guttata Owen, 1844; Siredon Humboldtii Duméril, Bibron, and Duméril, 1854; Amblystoma weismanni Wiedersheim, 1879; Siredon edule Dugès, 1888

= Axolotl =

Species of salamander

The axolotl (/ˈæksəlɒtəl/; from Classical Nahuatl: āxōlōtl [aːˈʃoːloːtɬ]; Ambystoma mexicanum) is a species of mole salamander. It is neotenic, reaching sexual maturity without undergoing metamorphosis, and the adults remain fully aquatic with obvious external gills. Axolotls may be difficult to distinguish from the larval stage of other neotenic adult mole salamanders, in particular the tiger salamander, or other species such as mudpuppies.

Axolotls originally inhabited a system of interconnected wetlands and lakes in the highlands of Mexico. They were known to inhabit the smaller lakes of Xochimilco and Chalco and are presumed to have inhabited the larger lakes of Texcoco and Zumpango. The desiccation of these lakes, initiated by the Aztecs and accelerated during the 20th century, has led to the destruction of much of the axolotl's natural habitat, an area now largely occupied by Mexico City. Wild axolotls have been driven to near extinction by the introduction of invasive species such as tilapia and carp; with a decreasing population of around 50 to 1,000 adult individuals, the species has been assessed as critically endangered by the International Union for Conservation of Nature (IUCN) and is listed under Appendix II of the Convention on International Trade in Endangered Species (CITES).

There currently exists a large captive population of axolotls, with specimens used extensively in scientific research because of their unusual ability to regenerate body parts, including limbs, gills and parts of their eyes and brains. The species is also used as a model organism. As aquarium technology has developed, axolotls have become a common exhibit in zoos and public aquariums, as well as an occasional pet in home aquariums. The axolotl is a popular subject in contemporary culture, inspiring a number of works and characters in the media.

== Nomenclature ==
The term "axolotl" is a Nahuatl word which has been translated variably as "water slave", "water servant", "water sprite", "water player", "water monstrosity", "water twin", or "water dog". The word refers to Xolotl, the Aztec god who holds dominion over fire, lightning, the dead and the resurrected, dogs, games, grotesque or ugly beings, and twins (as he is the twin of Quetzalcōātl).

Some sources prefer the term "Mexican axolotl" to refer to this species unambiguously, as "axolotl" may be used for unmetamorphosed individuals of other Ambystoma species, although the word is most commonly used to refer to wild A. mexicanum and captive individuals.

== Description ==
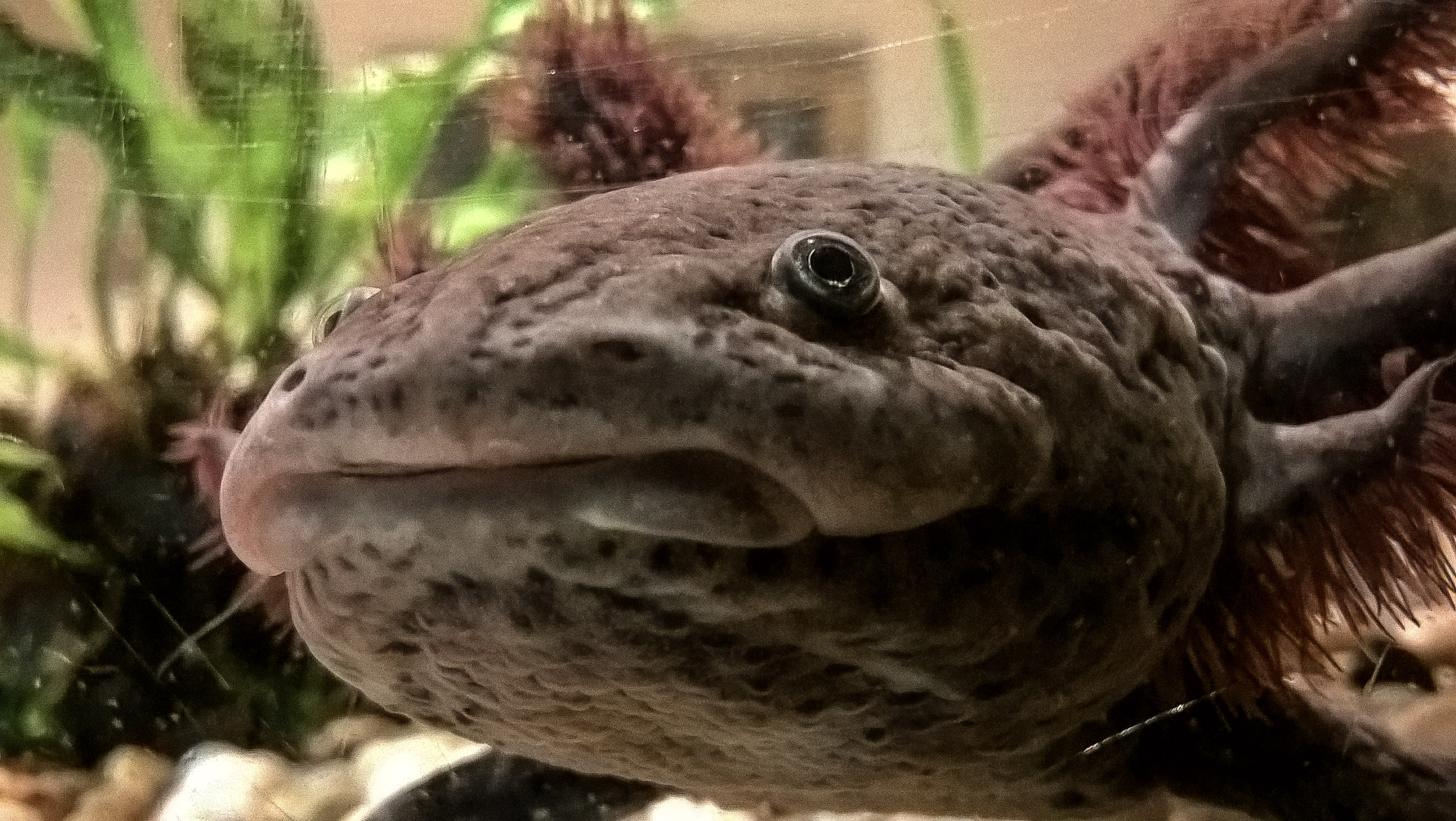
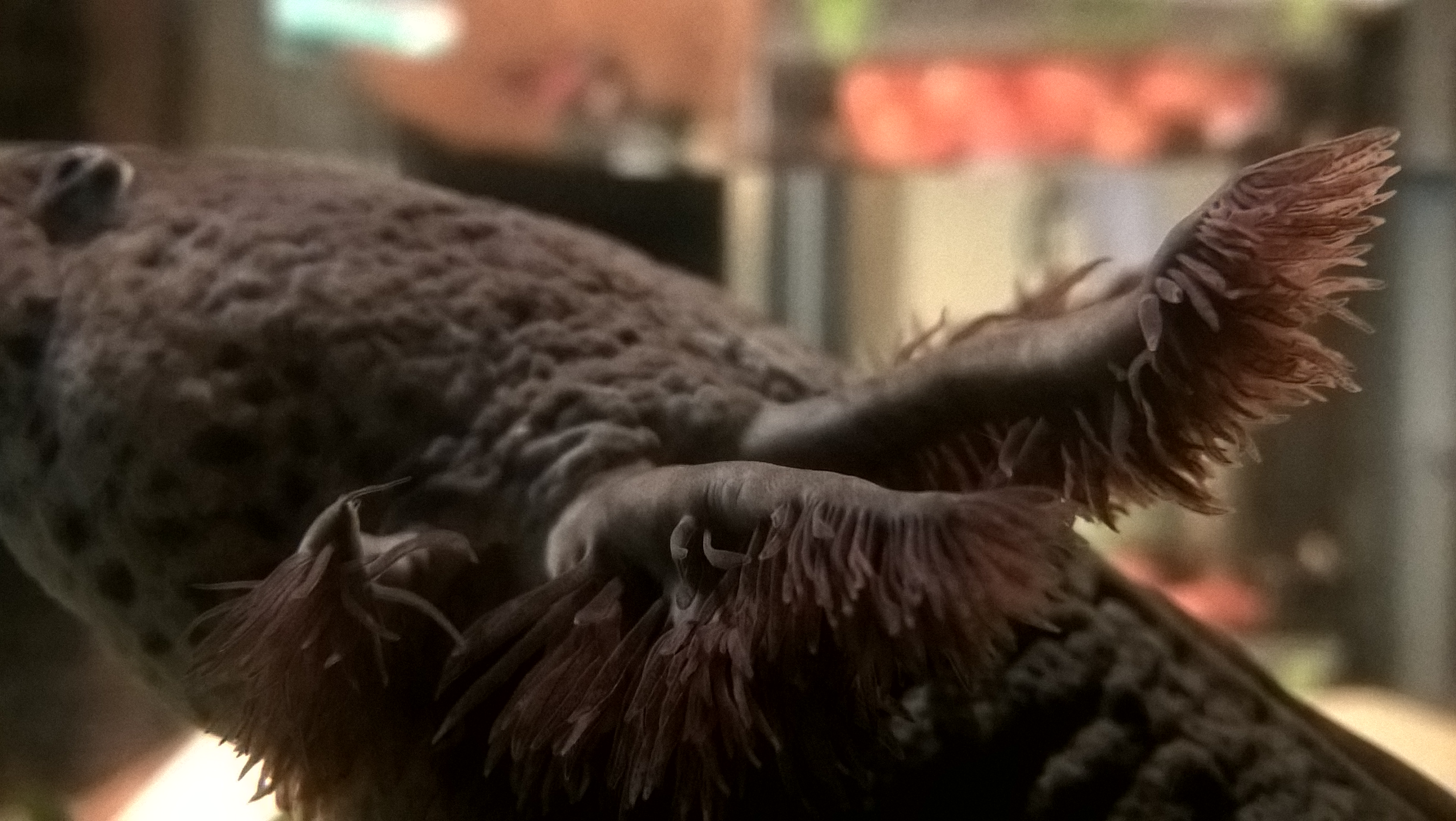
Head of a dark-colored axolotl

A sexually mature adult axolotl, at age 18–27 months, ranges in length from 15 to 45 cm (6 to 18 in); a size close to 23 cm (9 in) is most common, and any greater than 30 cm (12 in) is rare. Axolotls possess features typical of salamander larvae, including external gills and a caudal fin extending from behind the head to the vent. Unlike most salamander species, axolotls retain their external gills when they mature into adulthood. This is a type of neoteny.

Axolotls have wide heads and lidless eyes. Their limbs are underdeveloped and possess long, thin digits. Three pairs of external gill stalks (rami) originate from behind the head and are used to move oxygenated water. These are lined with filaments (fimbriae) to increase the surface area for gas exchange. Four gill slits lined with gill rakers are hidden underneath the external gills, which prevent food from entering and allow particles to filter through. Males can be identified by their swollen cloacae lined with papillae, while females have noticeably wider bodies when gravid and full of eggs.

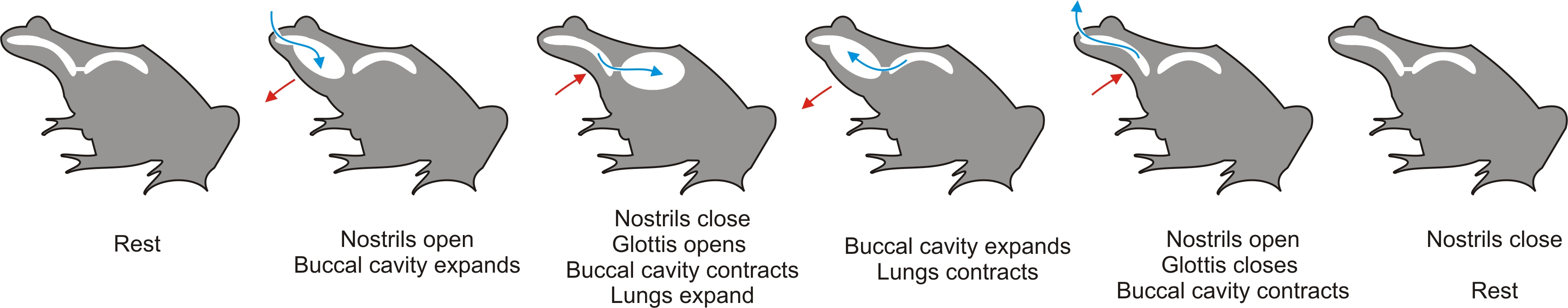
Buccal pumping

Axolotls have barely visible vestigial teeth; other salamanders only develop these during metamorphosis. Their primary method of feeding is by suction, during which their rakers interlock to close the gill slits. Axolotls use their external gills for respiration; buccal pumping (gulping air from the surface) may also be used to provide oxygen to their lungs. Buccal pumping can occur in a two-stroke manner, pumping air from the mouth to the lungs, or a four-stroke manner, reversing this pathway using compression forces.

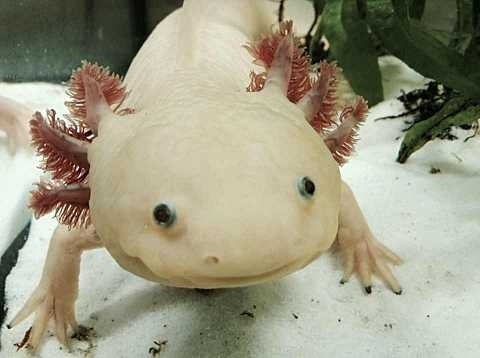
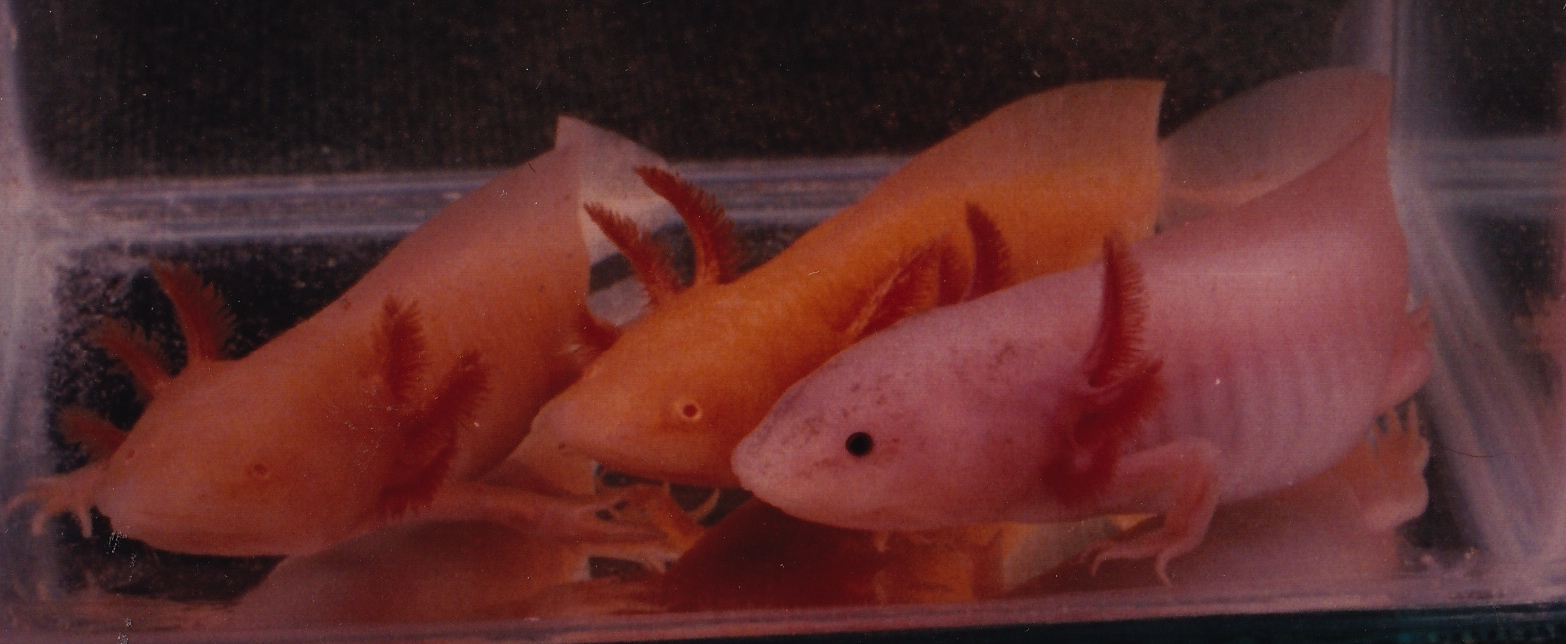
Captive axolotl color morphs

The wild type animal (the "natural" form) is brown or tan with gold speckles and an olive undertone. They can subtly alter their color by changing the relative size and thickness of the melanophores, presumably for camouflage. Axolotls have four pigmentation genes; when mutated, they create different color variants. The four most common mutant colors are as follows:

1. Leucistic: pale pink body, black eyes
2. Xanthic: grey body, black eyes
3. Albinistic: pale pink or white body, red eyes
4. Melanistic: black or dark blue body with no gold speckling or olive tone

In addition, there is wide individual variability in the size, frequency, and intensity of the gold speckling, and at least one variant leads to the development of a black and white piebald appearance upon reaching maturity. Pet breeders frequently cross the variant colors, and double homozygous mutants are common in the pet trade, especially white/pink animals with pink eyes that are double homozygous mutants for both the albino and leucistic genes.

The 32 billion base pair long sequence of the axolotl's genome was published in 2018; the largest animal genome completed at the time, it revealed species-specific genetic pathways that may be responsible for limb regeneration. Although the axolotl genome is about ten times the size of the human genome, it encodes a similar number of proteins (23,251, compared with about 20,000 in the human genome). The size difference is mostly explained by a large fraction of repetitive sequences; these also contribute to increased median intron sizes (22,759 bp), which are 13, 16 and 25 times that observed in human (1,750 bp), mouse (1,469 bp) and Tibetan frog (906 bp), respectively.

== Physiology ==
=== Regeneration ===
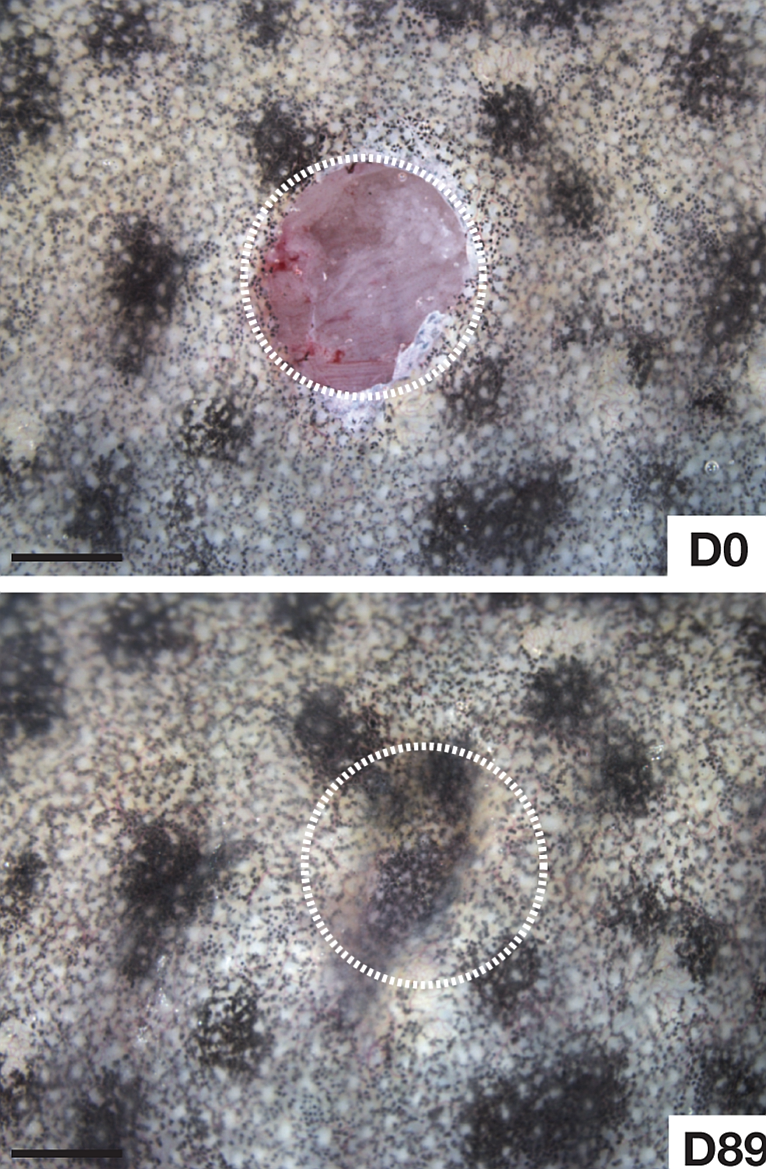
4 mm biopsy taken from an axolotl's back, immediately after procedure and 89 days after. Note the lack of scarring.

The characteristic of the axolotl that attracts the most attention is its unusual healing ability; axolotls do not heal by scarring but are instead capable of tissue regeneration. Entire lost appendages, such as the limbs and tail, can regrow over a period of months. In certain cases, more vital structures can be regrown, such as tissues of the eye and heart. Axolotls can even restore parts of their central nervous system, including non-vital parts of their brains. They can readily accept transplants from other individuals—including eyes and parts of the brain—restoring these "alien organs" to full functionality. In special cases, axolotls have been able to repair a damaged limb while also generating an additional limb, resulting in an extra appendage that makes them attractive to pet owners as a novelty.

The three basic requirements for limb regeneration in an axolotl are: (1) the formation of a wound epithelium, (2) the presence of nerve signaling, and (3) the presence of cells from the different axes (lines of orientation) of the affected limb. An epidermis quickly forms to seal the site of the wound. Over the next few days, the cells of the wound epidermis divide and grow, forming a blastema, at which point the wound is ready to heal and undergo patterning to form the new limb. It is believed that during limb generation, axolotls have a special system to regulate their internal macrophage level and suppress inflammation, as scarring would prevent proper healing and regeneration. However, this belief has been questioned by other studies.

A fundamental growth structure credited for the axolotl's ability to regenerate whole limbs in early development is the apical ectodermal ridge (AER), with the apical ectodermal cap (AEC). The AER initiates the growth of appendages in embryos by signaling how they are shaped and extended. Ectodermal cells are needed to form limbs in most tetrapods, amphibians and humans, but unlike most other animals the AEC in the axolotl can send signals through growth hormones to activate blastema cells, which can rebuild whole amputated or damaged limbs or organs.

The axolotl has indeterminate growth, meaning it continues to grow throughout its life. Some consider this trait to be a direct contributor to the axolotl's regenerative ability, which declines with age but does not completely disappear. The ability to regenerate limbs is greatly diminished in metamorphosed individuals.

=== Neoteny ===
Most amphibians begin their lives as aquatic animals unable to live on dry land, often called tadpoles. To reach adulthood, they go through a process called metamorphosis, in which they lose their gills and start living on land. The axolotl is unusual in that it has a lack of the thyroid-stimulating hormone that triggers the thyroid to produce thyroxine, which is needed for metamorphosis to take place; instead, the axolotl keeps its gills and lives in water all its life, even after becoming an adult and able to reproduce. The trait of reaching sexual maturity without undergoing metamorphosis is called neoteny.

The genes responsible for neoteny in laboratory axolotls may have been identified; they are not linked to the genes of wild populations, suggesting artificial selection is the cause of complete neoteny in laboratory and pet axolotls. The genes responsible have been narrowed down to a small chromosomal region called met1, which contains several candidate genes.

Many other species within the axolotl's genus are also either entirely neotenic or have neotenic populations. Sirens, Necturus mudpuppies, and the troglobitic olm are other examples of neotenic salamanders, although unlike axolotls they cannot be induced to metamorphose by an injection of iodine or thyroxine hormone.

=== Metamorphosis ===
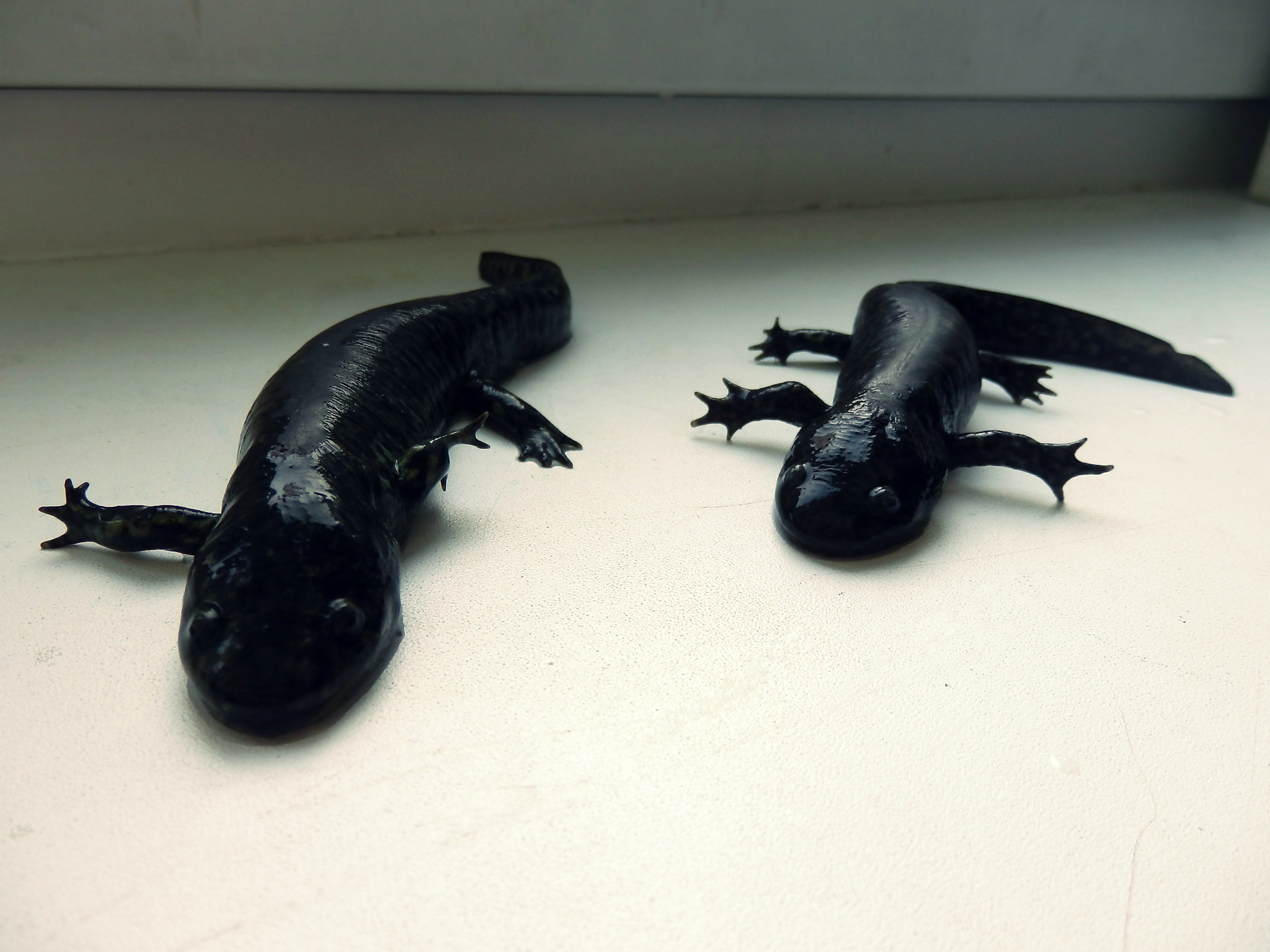
Metamorphosed axolotls

Over evolutionary time, the axolotl has lost the ability to naturally undergo metamorphosis. It has retained the capacity to undergo metamorphosis if provided with the necessary hormones through artificial administration. Under modern laboratory conditions, metamorphosis is reliably induced by administering thyroid hormones, including thyroxine, triiodo-L-thyronine, or thyroid-stimulating hormones.

Depending on the hormone used for induction, different outcomes may occur. Some hormones, such as triiodo-L-thyronine, can promote regenerative abilities while in some cases failing to produce complete metamorphosis. In contrast, thyroxine can inhibit regenerative abilities and accelerate metamorphosis.

After an axolotl undergoes hormonally induced metamorphosis and begins living on land, it experiences a number of physiological changes that help it adapt to terrestrial life. These include increased muscle tone in limbs, resorption of gills and fins into the body, the development of eyelids, and a reduction in the skin's permeability to water, allowing the axolotl to remain more effectively hydrated on land. The lungs of an axolotl, though present alongside gills after reaching non-metamorphosed adulthood, develop further during metamorphosis. Axolotls that complete metamorphosis are similar in appearance to the adult plateau tiger salamander, though axolotls have longer toes.

In the absence of induced metamorphosis, larval axolotls begin absorbing iodide into their thyroid glands at around 30 days post-fertilization. Larval axolotls do produce thyroid hormones from iodide, but the amount appears highly variable. In contrast, adult axolotls do not produce detectable levels of thyroid hormone unless metamorphosis is triggered.

== Wild population ==
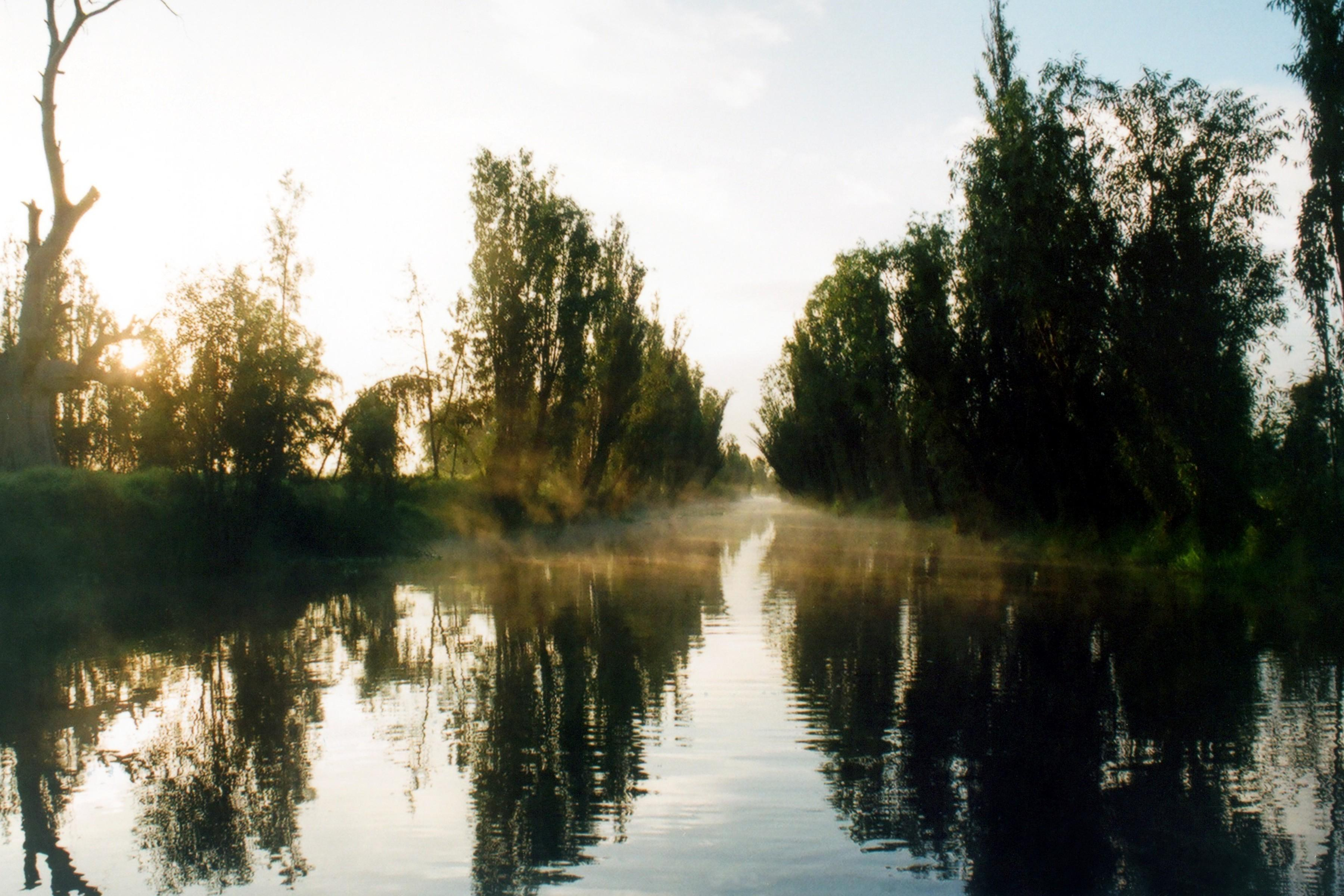
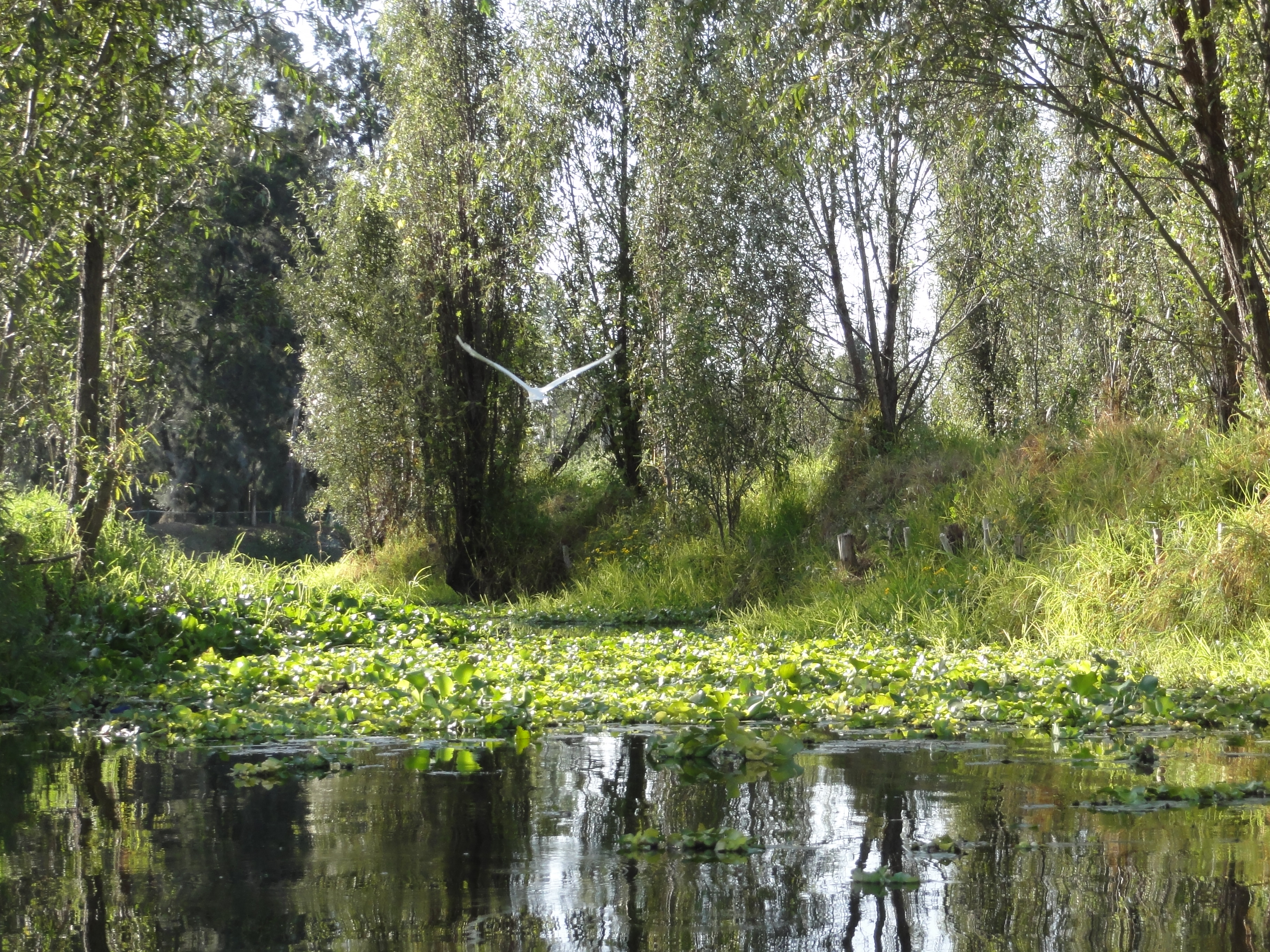
Lake Xochimilco, one of the last refuges of the wild axolotl

Axolotls are within the same genus as the tiger salamander (Ambystoma tigrinum), being part of its species complex along with all other Mexican species of Ambystoma. Within the family Ambystomatidae, the closest relative of the axolotl is the Eastern tiger salamander. The axolotl's habitat is like that of most neotenic Ambystoma species: a high-altitude body of water surrounded by a risky terrestrial environment, or other conditions unsuitable for the terrestrial form, with these conditions thought to favor the development of neoteny. However, a population of terrestrial Mexican tiger salamanders occupies and breeds in the axolotl's habitat (the two species being sympatric).

The axolotl is native to the freshwater lakes of Xochimilco and Chalco in the Valley of Mexico (though the species may have also once inhabited the larger Lakes of Texcoco and Zumpango). Lake Chalco is an unstable ecosystem, often being drained as a flood control measure, and Lake Xochimilco is a remnant of its former self, now existing mainly as canals. The water temperature in Xochimilco rarely rises above 20 °C (68 °F), and may fall to 6–7 °C (43–45 °F) or lower in the winter. A population of Ambystoma inhabiting the artificial lake at Chapultepec was confirmed to contain axolotls; as of 23 October 2019, the extent of occurrence was 467 square kilometres (180 sq mi). Overall, the wild axolotl prefers a system of water channels and deep-water lakes with abundant aquatic vegetation.

=== Biology ===
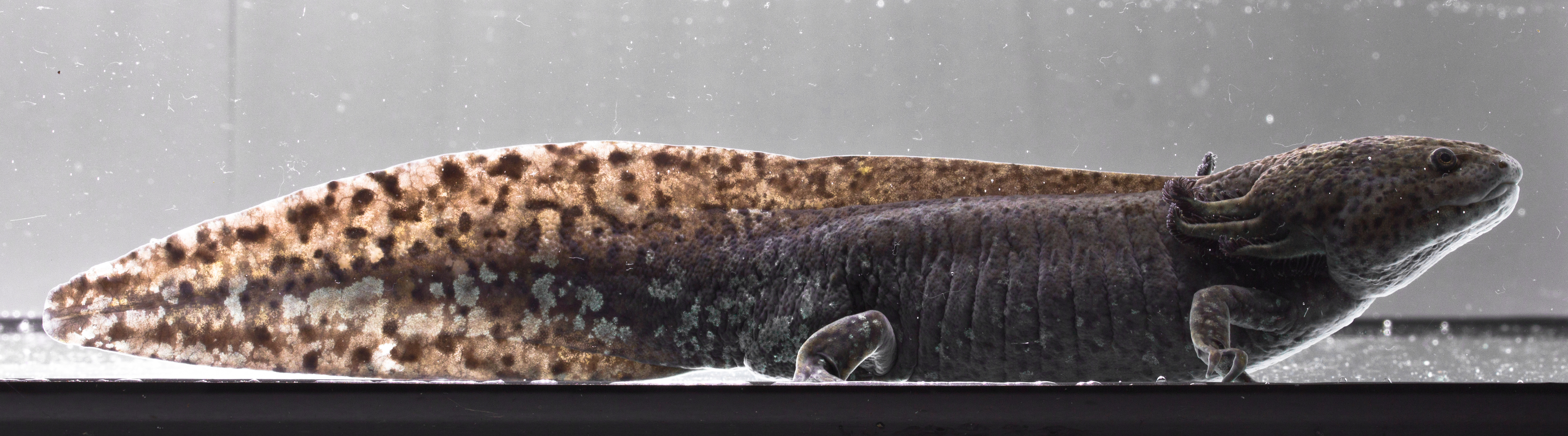
Wild form

The axolotl is carnivorous; in the wild, it consumes small prey such as mollusks, worms, aquatic insects, other arthropods (such as crayfish), and small fish, as well as other salamanders (including conspecifics). Axolotls locate food by smell and will "snap" at any potential meal, sucking the food into their stomachs with vacuum force.

The wild axolotl is thought to reach sexual maturity at 1.5 years of age, with a generation length of around 5.5 years. The life expectancy of a wild axolotl is between 10 and 15 years.

=== Threats ===
Axolotls are native only to the Mexican Central Valley, and the population once extended through most of the lakes and wetlands in this region. The axolotl's natural habitat is now limited to Lake Xochimilco as a result of the expansion of Mexico City and is under pressure from the city's growth. The axolotl is on the IUCN Red List of threatened species.

Surveys conducted in 1998, 2003, and 2008 found populations of 6,000, 1,000, and 100 axolotls per square kilometer, respectively, in Lake Xochimilco. A four-month-long search in 2013 found no surviving individuals in the wild, but one month later two were spotted in a network of canals leading from Xochimilco.

Lake Xochimilco has poor water quality; tests have revealed a low nitrogen-to-phosphorus ratio and a high concentration of chlorophyll a, indicative of an oxygen-poor environment not well-suited to axolotls. This has been caused by the demands of local industries, such as aquaculture and agriculture, which maintain the lake's water levels through inputs of partially treated wastewater. Intensively used agricultural pesticides eventually enter the lake through runoff, and these contain chemical compounds that sharply increase the mortality rate in axolotl embryos and larvae. Of the surviving embryos and larvae, there is also an increase in morphological, behavioral, and activity abnormalities.

The dramatic reduction in the native population has led to a significant loss of genetic diversity. This can be dangerous for the remaining population, as it causes increased inbreeding and reduced fitness and adaptive potential. Studies have found indicators of low interpopulation gene flow and higher rates of genetic drift. These are likely the result of multiple "bottleneck" incidents, where a sharp drop in the number of individuals in the population leads to decreased genetic diversity. The offspring produced after bottleneck events have a greater risk of poor fitness and are often less able to adapt. Several bottleneck events may even lead to extinction. Studies have also found high rates of relatedness indicative of inbreeding, which can cause an increase in the presence of deleterious, or harmful, mutations in genes. The detection of introgressed tiger salamander (A. tigrinum) DNA in the laboratory axolotl population raises concerns about the suitability of the captive population as an "ark" for potential reintroduction purposes.

Another factor that threatens the population is the introduction of invasive fish species, such as the Nile tilapia and the common carp. These fish eat the axolotls' young and compete for their food. The presence of these species has changed axolotl behavior, causing them to be less active in an effort to avoid predation. This reduced activity greatly impacts the axolotl's foraging and mating opportunities.

The fungus Batrachochytrium dendrobatidis has been detected in axolotls; this fungus causes the disease chytridiomycosis in amphibians and is a major concern for amphibian conservation worldwide. However, the axolotl displays resistance to both B. dendrobatidis and B. salamandrivorans, so chytridiomycosis is thought not to be a threat to this species.

=== Conservation efforts ===
The condition of the native axolotl population has improved little over the years. Many scientists are focusing their conservation efforts on the translocation of captive-bred individuals into new habitats or their reintroduction into Lake Xochimilco. Studies have shown that axolotls born in captivity and raised in a semi-natural environment are capable of surviving in the wild, catching prey and escaping predators with moderate success. These captive-bred individuals may be introduced into unpolluted bodies of water or returned to Lake Xochimilco; however, with the amount of pollution in the lake, the presence of invasive species and the region's continuing urbanization, the translocated axolotls might eventually have the same fate as the wild population.

The Laboratorio de Restauracion Ecologica (transl. Laboratory of Ecological Restoration) of the National Autonomous University of Mexico has built up a population of 100 captive-bred axolotls, as of 2021. These are mostly used for research, but there are plans to establish a viable population in a semi-artificial wetland inside the university.

A 2025 study confirmed the viability of releasing captive-bred axolotls into the wild, with recaptured individuals having gained weight since their release. However, this practice risks losing the axolotls through predation, as several of those released were preyed on by great egrets.

== Relation to humans ==
=== Research history ===
German naturalist and explorer Alexander von Humboldt noted in the 19th century that the Mexicans, having been vanquished by the Spanish Empire, lived "in great want, compelled to feed on roots of aquatic plants, insects and a problematical reptile called axolotl".

In 1863, a shipment of 34 adult axolotls was sent from Mexico City to the Jardin des Plantes in Paris, from which thousands of specimens were captive-bred and distributed around Europe for scientific research. Unaware of their neoteny, French zoologist Auguste Duméril was surprised when, instead of the axolotl, he found in the vivarium a new species, similar to the salamander. This discovery was the starting point of research about neoteny. It is not certain that Ambystoma velasci specimens were not included in the original shipment.

In Prague, the Czech medical doctor Vilém Laufberger used thyroid hormone injections to induce an axolotl to grow into a terrestrial adult salamander. Unaware that it had already been carried out, Englishman Julian Huxley repeated the experiment using ground animal thyroid glands. Since then, experiments have often involved the injection of iodine or various thyroid hormones to induce metamorphosis.

=== Use as a model organism ===
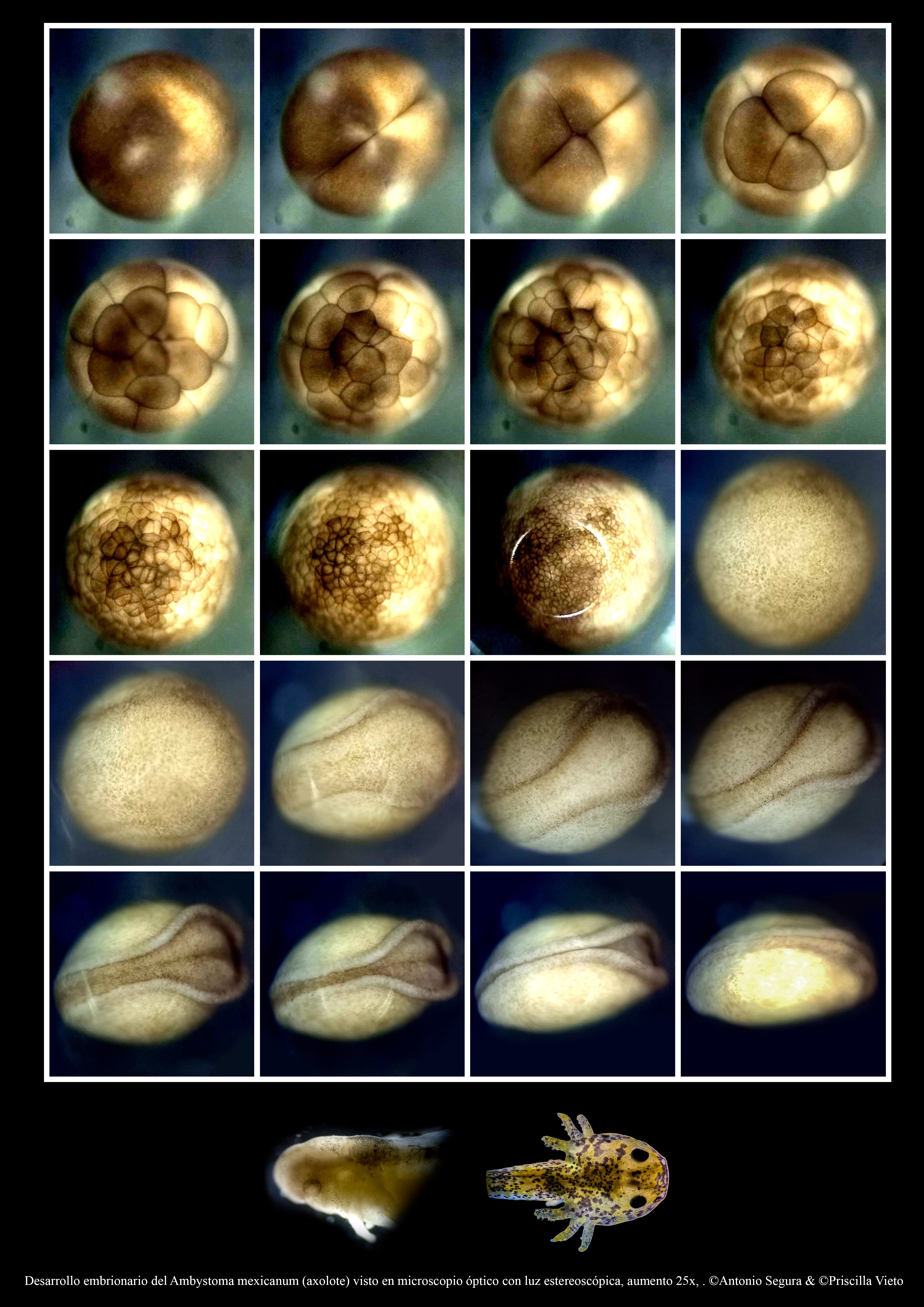
Stages of development (images captured using stereoscopic macrophotography)

Bred in captivity in large numbers, the axolotl is used extensively in research as a model organism. They are especially easy to breed compared with other salamanders in the Ambystomatidae family, which are rarely captive-bred because of the husbandry demands of terrestrial life. One attractive feature of the axolotl for research purposes is the large and easily manipulated embryo, which allows viewing of the full development of a vertebrate. Axolotls are used in heart defect studies due to the presence of a mutant gene that causes heart failure in embryos. Since the axolotl embryo survives almost to hatching with no heart function, the defect is very observable. Further research has been conducted to examine the axolotl's heart as a model of a single human ventricle and excessive trabeculation. The axolotl is also considered an ideal animal model for the study of neural tube closure due to the similarities between human and axolotl neural plate and tube formation; the axolotl's neural tube, unlike that of a frog, is not hidden under a layer of superficial epithelium. There are additional mutations affecting other organ systems, some of which are not yet well characterized.

The regenerative abilities of the axolotl have led to its use as a model for the development of limbs in vertebrates, with the goal of understanding how humans can achieve better ways to heal from serious injuries. This also makes the species an ideal model organism for studying the properties of stem cells and the process of neoteny. Current research can record specific examples of the axolotl's regenerative properties through tracking cell fates and behaviors, lineage tracing from skin triploid cell grafts, pigmentation imaging, electroporation, tissue clearing and lineage tracing from dye labeling. The newer technologies of germline modification and transgenesis are better suited for live imaging the regenerative processes that occur for axolotls.

In a 2025 study, scientists found a new method of inserting and activating the genes inside the axolotl's brain and nervous system using special, harmless viruses called adeno-associated viruses (AAVs). It had previously been difficult for researchers to make specific genes work inside the axolotl, but this discovery allows them to explore how the axolotl's nervous system helps it regrow body parts such as the brain and spinal cord. Additionally, they found that the axolotl's nervous system has a unique two-way communication between the brain and eye.

The genetics of the color variants of the axolotl have also been widely studied.

=== Online Model Organism Database ===
Axolotl is a partially supported species on Xenbase. This includes genome download, BLAST, and JBrowse functionalities.

=== Captive care ===
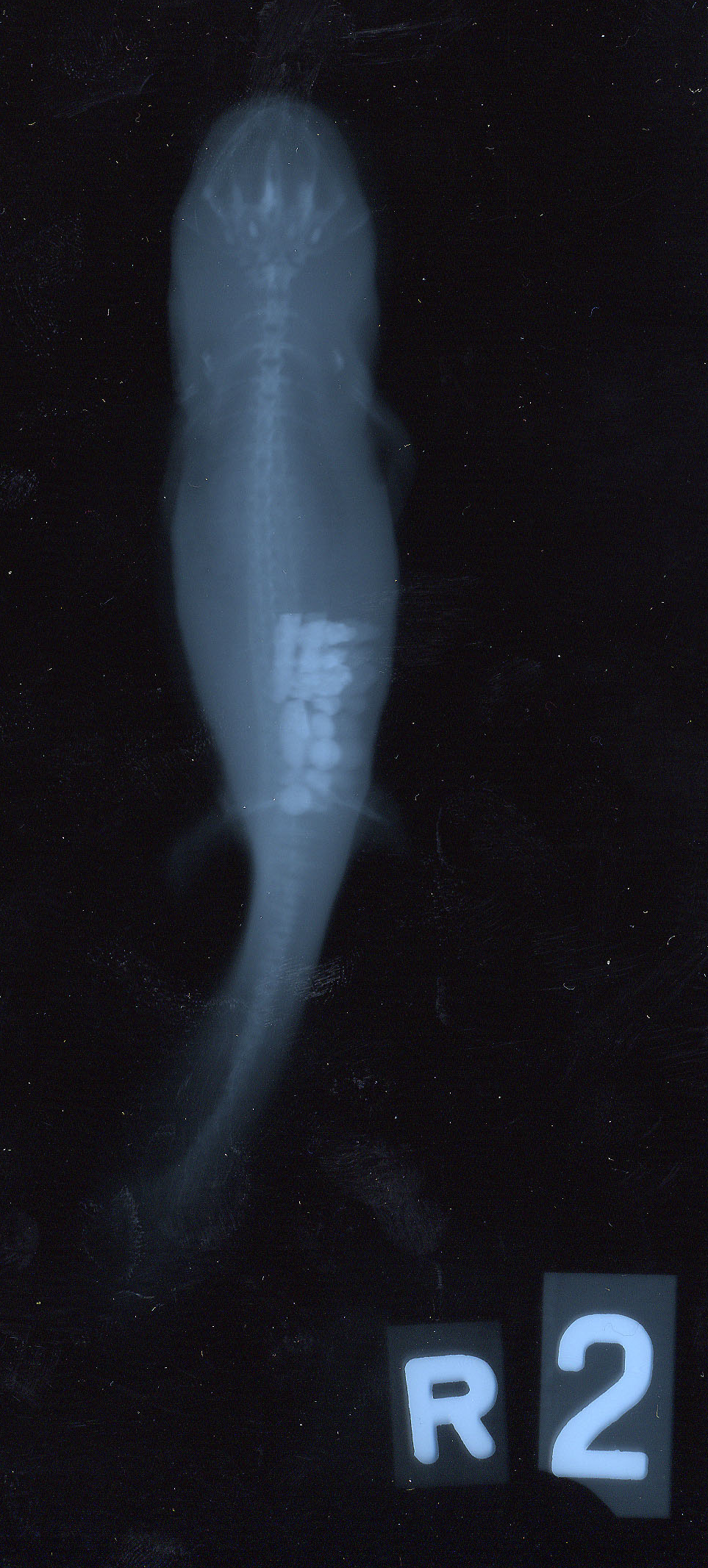
This animal was X-rayed several times as part of a research project over a period of two years. It was a normal healthy adult (26.3 cm; 159.5 gm) at the beginning of the project and lived several more years after the project ended.

The axolotl is a popular exotic pet like its relative, the tiger salamander (Ambystoma tigrinum). Most axolotls under human care descended from a single group of under 36 individuals, with notable genetic differences from the wild population. Like all poikilothermic organisms, lower temperatures result in slower metabolism and reduced appetite. Temperatures at approximately 16 °C (61 °F) to 18 °C (64 °F) are suggested for captive axolotls to ensure sufficient food intake; temperatures higher than 24 °C (75 °F) may lead to metabolic rate increase, also causing stress and eventually death. Chlorine, commonly added to tap water, is harmful to axolotls. A single axolotl typically requires a 150-litre (40-US-gallon) tank. Axolotls spend the majority of the time at the bottom of their tanks.

In captivity, axolotls eat a variety of readily available foods, including trout and salmon pellets, frozen or live bloodworms, earthworms, and waxworms. Axolotls can also eat feeder fish, but care should be taken as fish may contain parasites.

Substrates are another important consideration for captive axolotls, as axolotls (like other amphibians and reptiles) tend to ingest bedding material together with food and are commonly prone to gastrointestinal obstruction and foreign body ingestion. Some common substrates used for animal enclosures can be harmful for amphibians and reptiles. Gravel (common in aquarium use) should not be used, and is recommended that any sand consists of smooth particles with a grain size of under 1mm. One guide to axolotl care for laboratories notes that bowel obstructions are a common cause of death, and recommends that no items with a diameter below 3 cm (or approximately the size of the animal's head) should be available to the animal.

There is some evidence that axolotls might seek out appropriately-sized gravel for use as gastroliths based on experiments conducted at the University of Manitoba axolotl colony. As there is no conclusive evidence pointing to gastrolith use, gravel should be avoided due to the high risk of impaction.

Salts, such as Holtfreter's solution, are often added to the water to prevent infection. Among hobbyists, the process of artificially inducing metamorphosis can often result in death during or even following a successful attempt, and so casual hobbyists are generally discouraged from attempting to induce metamorphosis in pet axolotls. Morphed pet axolotls should be given solid footholds in their enclosure to satisfy their need for land. They should not be given live animals as food.

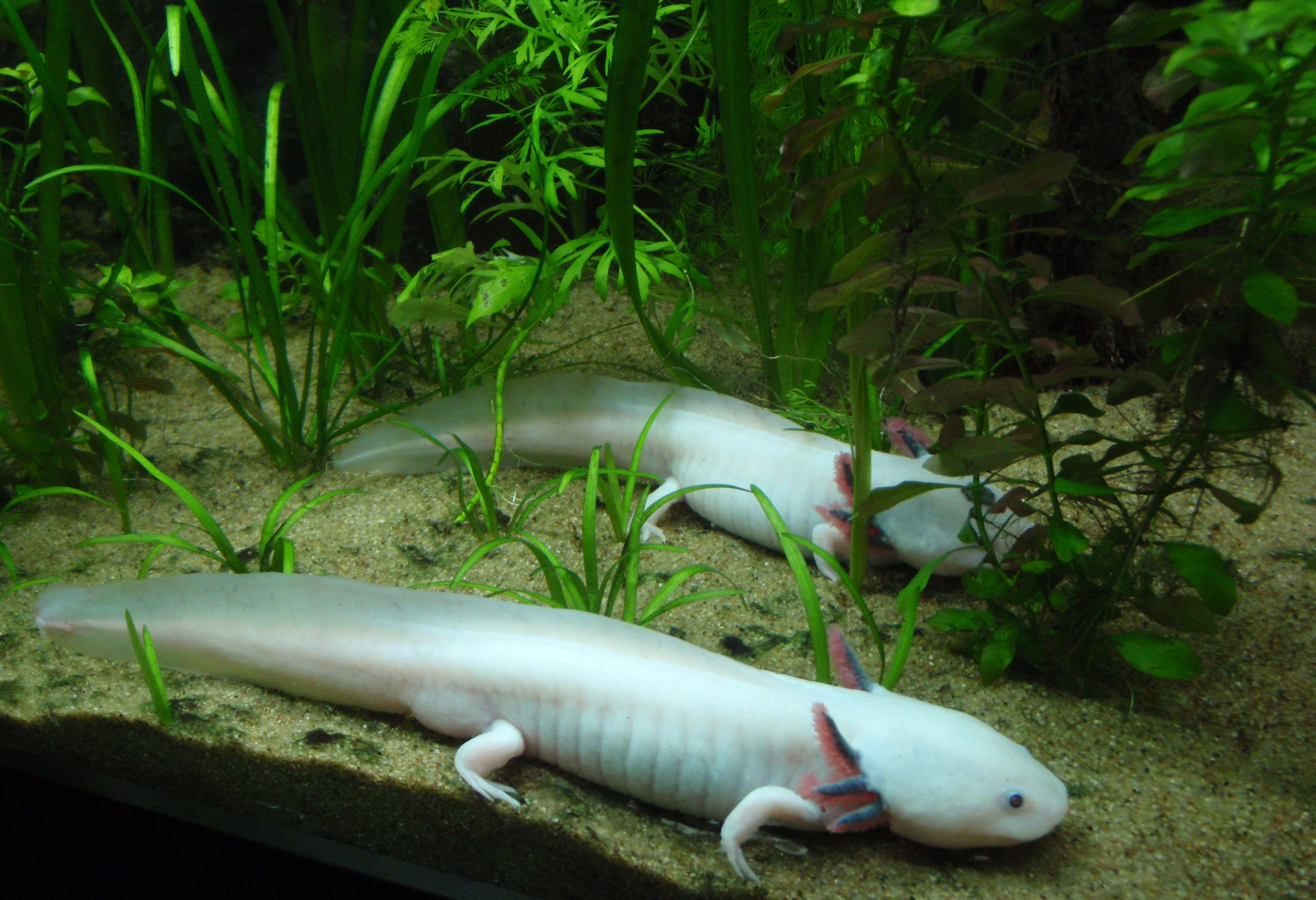
These axolotls at Vancouver Aquarium are leucistic, with less pigmentation than normal.

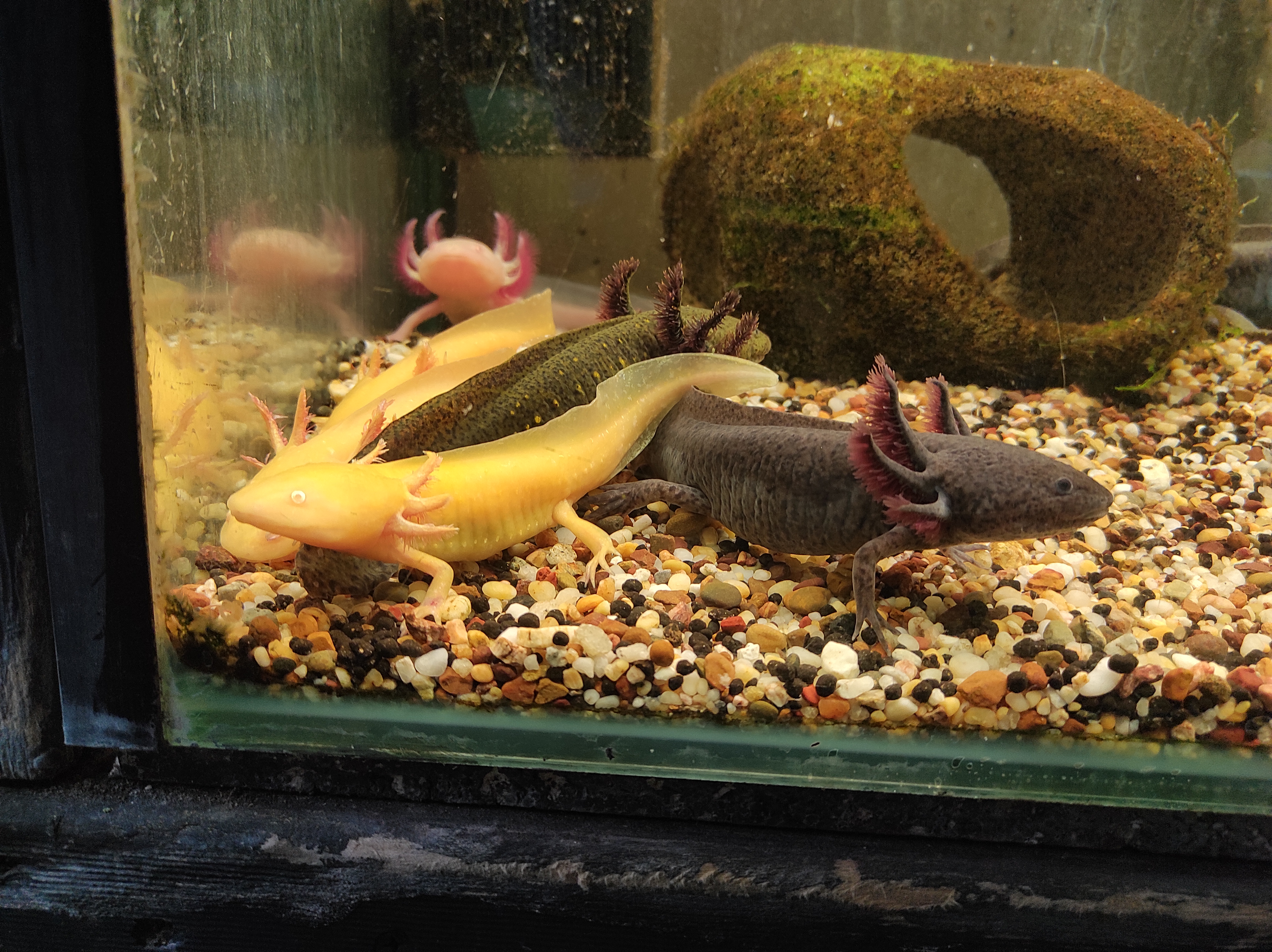
Axolotls in a pet store in Melbourne, Australia

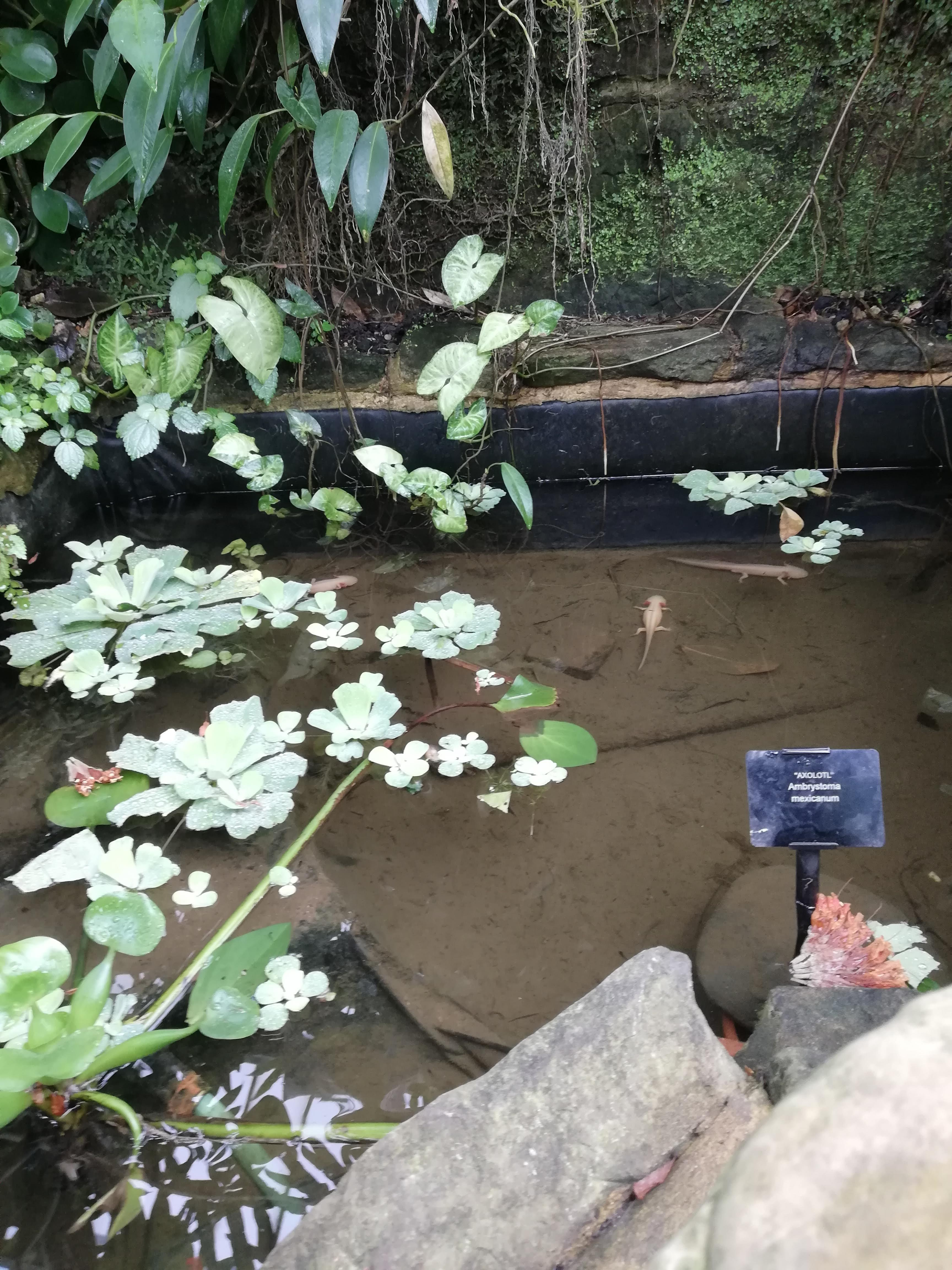
Axolotls in a pond with Pistia, Kew Gardens

=== Cultural significance ===
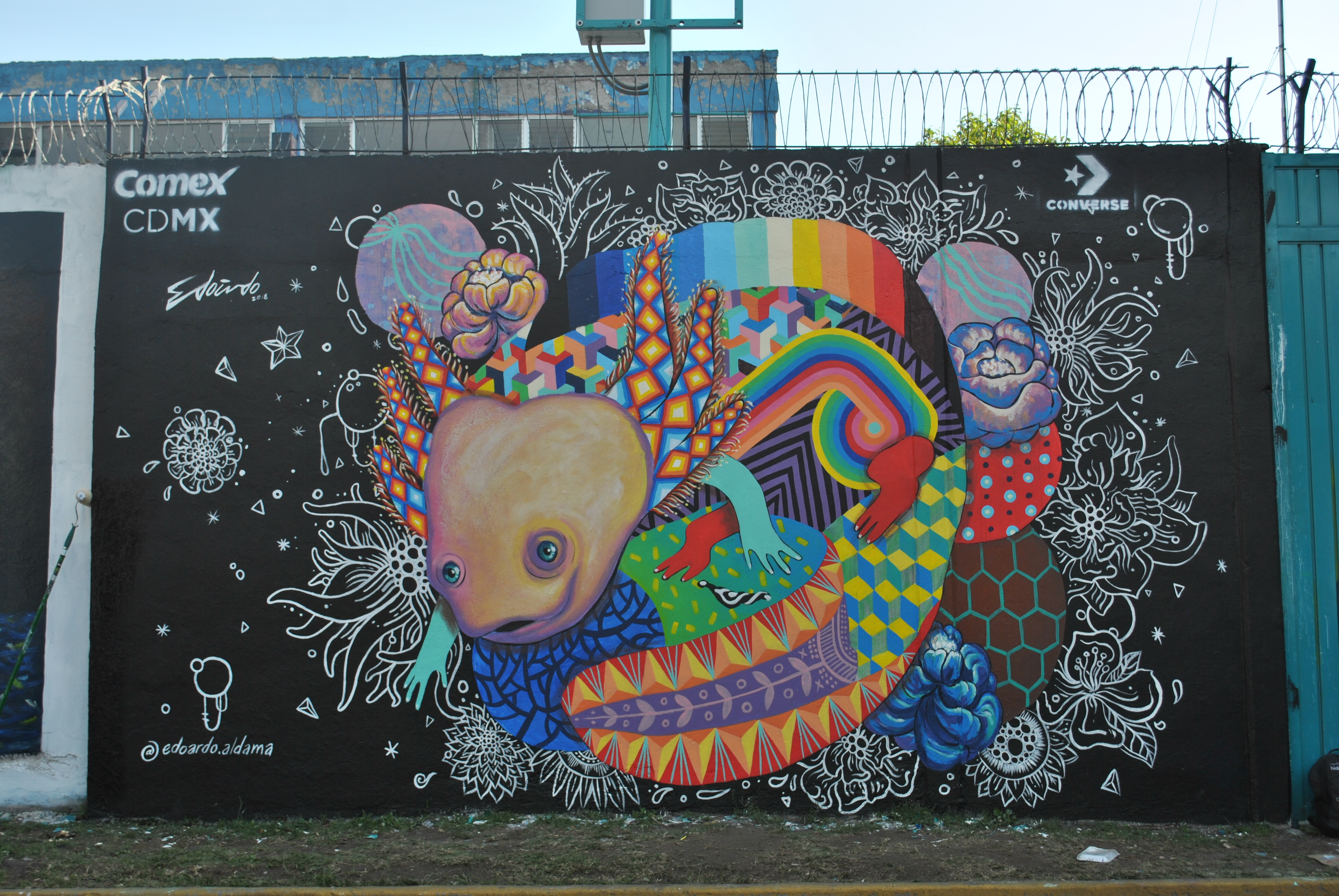
Axolotl graffiti in Mexico City

The species is named after Xolotl, the Aztec god of fire and lightning, who transformed himself into an axolotl to avoid being sacrificed by fellow gods. Axolotls continue to play a substantial cultural role in Mexico. For example, they appear in Diego Rivera's 1951 mural Agua, el origen de la vida (Water, the Origin of Life) at the Cárcamo de Dolores in Chapultepec Park, as well as in a number of murals throughout Mexico City. It became the official emoji of Mexico City in 2017.

In 2021, Mexico released a new design for the 50-peso banknote featuring an axolotl on its reverse. It was recognized as "Bank Note of the Year" by the International Bank Note Society. The banknote has become a collectable item because of its design; the Bank of Mexico reported in 2025 that up to 50 million were being kept out of circulation, as millions of people were choosing to hoard the notes rather than spend them.

In Japan, the creatures are commonly known as "wooper loopers" (ウーパールーパー) following a 1980s marketing campaign by Nissin Foods featuring an axolotl with that name. In 1999, the video games Pokémon Gold and Silver, made by Japanese developer Game Freak, introduced a Pokémon named Wooper, which is directly based on an axolotl. Additionally, in 2002, Pokémon Ruby and Sapphire introduced the Pokémon Mudkip and its evolutions, which take some visual inspiration from axolotls.

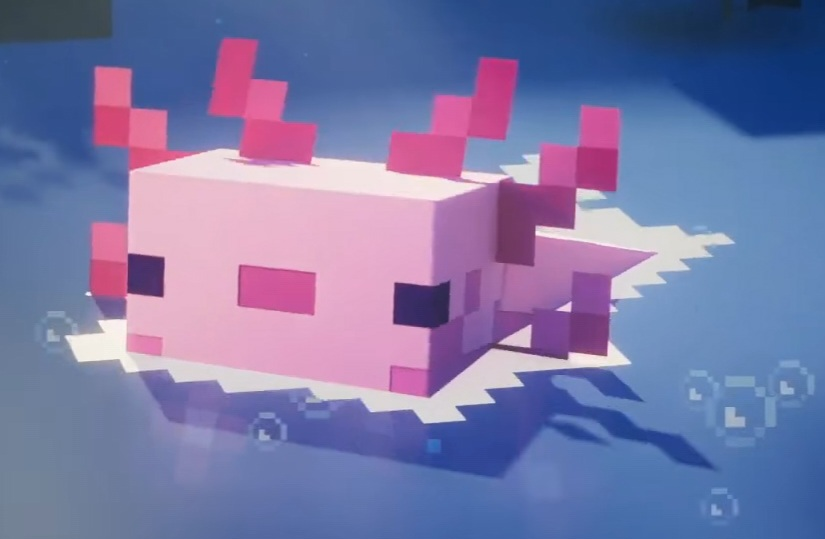
Axolotl as seen in an official Minecraft animation

Starting in the late 20th and early 21st century, the axolotl became popularized as a cultural icon, with its likeness appearing in or inspiring various aspects of contemporary media, such as television shows, movies, or video games. Axolotls were added to the video game Minecraft in 2020 (depicted as troglofauna in-game), following Mojang Studios' trend of incorporating endangered species to raise awareness, and they were included in its spin-offs Minecraft: Dungeons and Lego Minecraft. In the How to Train Your Dragon movie franchise, the dragon Toothless was also modeled after axolotls. They also feature prominently in the game Axie Infinity. An axolotl doll can be obtained as an item in PewDiePie's Tuber Simulator.

Julio Cortázar wrote a short story titled "Axolotl", in which the narrator encounters axolotls in the aquarium at the Jardin des Plantes de Paris.

In 2019, a star in the equatorial constellation of Cetus was named Axólotl.

== See also ==
- Amphibious fish – Fish that can leave water for periods of time
- Barred tiger salamander – Species of amphibian
- Eurycea neotenes – Species of amphibian
- Handfish – Family of fishes
- Lake Patzcuaro salamander – Species of amphibian
- Regenerative medicine – Medical field involved in regenerating tissues
- Texas blind salamander – Species of amphibian
