= Malcolm Steinberg =

Malcolm Saul Steinberg (June 1, 1930 - February 7, 2012) was an American biologist who proposed the differential adhesion hypothesis as a mechanism explaining cell sorting during embryogenesis and cancer.

Steinberg proposed that when cells form distinct tissues, specific cell-cell adhesion between cells from the same tissue can drive the separation. He further proposed that a difference in level of cell adhesion molecules expression between two cell types was sufficient to drive the separation. He confirmed these predictions in a model system in which adhesion between cells of a cultured line of mouse cells was controlled by genetic expression levels of cadherin.

Steinberg pioneered work in characterizing the physical properties of cells and tissues. He proposed that cell-cell adhesion drives tissue rounding up and, comparing tissues to liquids, he proposed that tissues have a surface tension. To measure tissue surface tension, he participated in building a compression device for rounded cell aggregates, and in sessile droplet experiments in which aggregates of cells were centrifuged at 37 degrees until their shapes reached equilibrium.

Later experiments led him to conclude that differential adhesion, and an adhesion gradient, guide the salamander pronephric duct to the cloaca during embryonic development.

Steinberg completed his BS at Amherst College in 1952, his PhD in zoology at the University of Minnesota in 1956, was a professor of biology at Johns Hopkins University from 1958 to 1966, and transferred to Princeton University in 1966, becoming professor emeritus in 2005.
