= Johannes Holtfreter =

American embryologist (1901–1992)

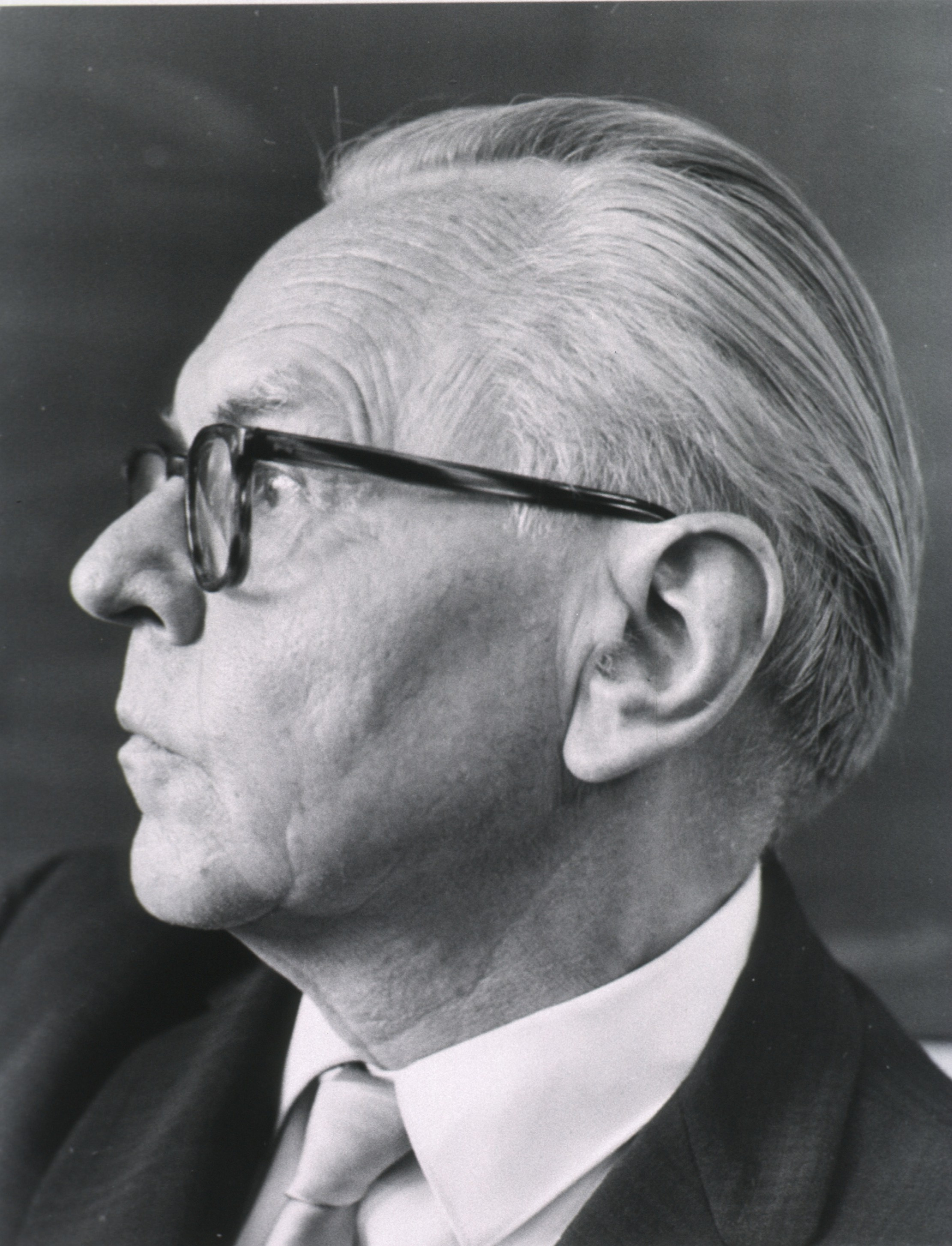
- Holtfreter in 1966
- Born: January 9, 1901; Richtenberg, Germany
- Died: November 13, 1992 (aged 91); Rochester, New York, U.S.
- Known for: Chemotaxis
- Scientific career
- Fields: Embryology

Johannes Holtfreter (January 9, 1901 – November 13, 1992) was a German-American developmental biologist whose primary focus was the "organizer", a part of the embryo essential for the development of the proper body plan.

== Biography ==
Holtfreter was born on January 9, 1901, in Richtenberg, Pomerania, Germany, as the only son and second out of three children. As a child, he captured animals (including butterflies) and made drawings of them, and after graduating from the Realgymnasium, he wanted to enter field biology. Upon beginning this path at the University of Rostock and Leipzig University, he eventually moved to the University of Freiburg to study under Doflein, a famous naturalist who died soon after Holtfreter transferred. His new thesis advisor was Hans Spemann, who introduced Holtfreter to his eventual field of study: embryology.

After obtaining his Ph.D. in 1924, he eventually entered the field of marine biology at the Stazione Zoologica in Naples, and traveled around Europe afterward, painting, attempting to research, and passing through locations including Lapland and Helgoland. However, he was unable to find a steady research position until 1928, when Otto Mangold of the Kaiser-Wilhelm Institute recruited Holtfreter. Here, Holtfreter followed up on the research his old advisor (Spemann) did on the concept of an "organizer", or a part of the developing organism that dictates the fates of other cells. Joseph Needham, an English biologist interested in Holtfreter's work, went to the Kaiser-Wilhelm Institute to research with him.

Holtfreter then researched at the Ludwig-Maximilians-Universität München, beginning in 1934, and pursued further global travels, particularly to Bali. Needham, the English researcher who was also interested in the organizer, was able to ensure Holtfreter's escape from the Nazi regime in 1939 after Holtfreter commented how the Gestapo was watching him and how his safety seemed jeopardized. After fleeing to the University of Cambridge, Holtfreter was taken to an internment camp in Canada in 1940 due to his German nationality. He then received a Rockefeller Fellowship to study at McGill University in 1942, where he based gastrulation-centered work on research conducted by Walter Vogt in 1929. In 1946, he was invited to become an assistant professor at the University of Rochester by another scientist he had met during his time at the Kaiser-Wilhelm Institute, Curt Stern. He was then promoted to full professor in 1948. Holtfreter researched in Rochester until retiring in 1969, and his focus was once again the "organizer" examined by Spemann and his previous research, along with other topics including a foray into the newly emerging field of cell biology.

After retiring, Holtfreter became a professor emeritus of zoology at Rochester until 1981 and lived out the rest of his life in Rochester before dying at the age of 91.

== Research and accomplishments ==
Through his research on amphibian embryos, Holtfreter had made many significant discoveries in the field of developmental biology, though the organizer or neural inducer was his major focus. Holtfreter (along with other developmental biologists including Hans Spemann) demonstrated that the neural inducer still functioned after treatments including heat killing and alcohol treatment (it still produced a secondary body axis). This set of experiments paved the way for Holtfreter to discover other types of inducers.

Holtfreter also solved two problems that plagued many other preceding developmental biologists (infection of embryo specimens by bacteria and inability of the specimen to survive in solutions containing improper levels of salts) by devising both the sterile technique to eliminate bacteria and Holtfreter's medium to allow the developing embryonic cells to survive for extended periods.

Finally, Holtfreter provided strong evidence that induction is necessary for neural tube development by examining how tissues like the notochord aid in the formation of the neural tube. He demonstrated that the notochord provides necessary signals to ensure the neural tube's ventral differentiation. As a capstone paper, Viktor Hamburger and Holtfreter published an amphibian development chapter that contained in it the information gathered by many preeminent amphibian development researchers and described Holtfreter's theory that cell-cell interactions are critical in the development of the organism.
