= Walter Voit =

- Education: Georgia Tech (PhD); UT Dallas (MS); UT Dallas (BS)
- Occupations: Researcher; Professor; Entrepreneur
- Scientific career
- Workplaces: University of Texas at Dallas

Walter Voit is an American associate professor of materials science and engineering at the University of Texas at Dallas. He is the CEO of Adaptive 3D, a company that was acquired by Desktop Metal in May 2021, and specialized in producing polymers for additive manufacturing. He was also inducted into the College of Fellows of the American Institute for Medical and Biological Engineering. He is currently the head of the Advanced Polymer Research Lab at the University of Texas at Dallas, and his research into shape memory polymers allowed for the creation of flexible bioelectronic devices that passed an in vivo study in lab rats.
