= SALL1 =

Protein-coding gene in the species Homo sapiens

Identifiers
- Aliases: SALL1, HEL-S-89, HSAL1, Sal-1, TBS, ZNF794, spalt-like transcription factor 1, spalt like transcription factor 1
- External IDs: OMIM: 602218; MGI: 1889585; GeneCards: SALL1

Gene location (Human)
Chr.	Chromosome 16 (human)
Band	16q12.1	Start	51,135,982 bp
Band	16q12.1	End	51,152,334 bp

Gene location (Mouse)
Chr.	Chromosome 8 (mouse)
Band	8|8 C3	Start	89,753,863 bp
Band	8|8 C3	End	89,770,790 bp
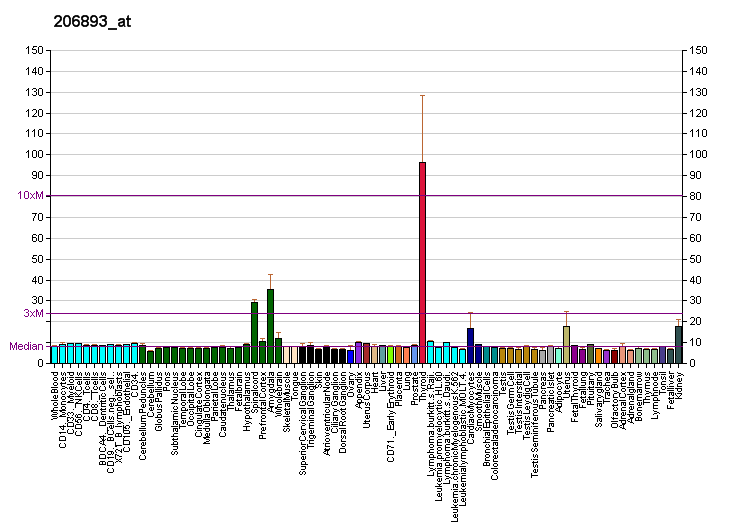
RNA expression pattern
Bgee	Human / Mouse (ortholog); Top expressed in: ventricular zone; inferior ganglion of vagus nerve; renal medulla; subthalamic nucleus; superior vestibular nucleus; ganglionic eminence; internal globus pallidus; stromal cell of endometrium; right lobe of liver; spinal cord / Top expressed in: pineal gland; tail of embryo; ventricular zone; decidua; Rostral migratory stream; epiblast; olfactory bulb; primitive streak; renal corpuscle; gastrula; More reference expression data
BioGPS	More reference expression data
Gene ontology
Molecular function	DNA binding; sequence-specific DNA binding; beta-catenin binding; histone deacetylase activity; DNA-binding transcription factor activity; metal ion binding; RNA polymerase II cis-regulatory region sequence-specific DNA binding; DNA-binding transcription repressor activity, RNA polymerase II-specific; protein binding; nucleic acid binding; DNA-binding transcription factor activity, RNA polymerase II-specific
Cellular component	cytoplasm; NuRD complex; nucleoplasm; heterochromatin; chromocenter; nucleus
Biological process	neurogenesis; ureteric bud development; pituitary gland development; kidney epithelium development; inductive cell-cell signaling; regulation of transcription, DNA-templated; olfactory bulb mitral cell layer development; ventricular septum development; olfactory bulb interneuron differentiation; somatic stem cell population maintenance; kidney development; embryonic digit morphogenesis; mesenchymal to epithelial transition involved in metanephros morphogenesis; outer ear morphogenesis; olfactory nerve development; negative regulation of transcription by RNA polymerase II; adrenal gland development; ureteric bud invasion; transcription, DNA-templated; limb development; positive regulation of Wnt signaling pathway; positive regulation of transcription, DNA-templated; development of the heart; branching involved in ureteric bud morphogenesis; negative regulation of transcription, DNA-templated; gonad development; embryonic digestive tract development; positive regulation of transcription by RNA polymerase II; histone deacetylation
Sources:Amigo / QuickGO
Orthologs
Databases	NCBI: entry; OMA: entry
Species	Human	Mouse
Entrez	6299	58198
Ensembl	ENSG00000103449	ENSMUSG00000031665
UniProt	Q9NSC2	Q9ER74; Q6P5E3
RefSeq (mRNA)	NM_001127892; NM_002968	NM_021390; NM_001371069; NM_001371070
RefSeq (protein)	NP_001121364; NP_002959	NP_067365; NP_001357998; NP_001357999
Location (UCSC)	Chr 16: 51.14 – 51.15 Mb	Chr 8: 89.75 – 89.77 Mb
PubMed search
- Wikidata
View/Edit Human	View/Edit Mouse

Sal-like 1 (Drosophila), also known as SALL1, is a protein which in humans is encoded by the SALL1 gene. As the full name suggests, it is one of the human versions of the spalt (sal) gene known in Drosophila.

== Function ==
The protein encoded by this gene is a zinc finger transcriptional repressor and may be part of the NuRD histone deacetylase (HDAC) complex.

== Clinical significance ==
Defects in this gene are a cause of Townes–Brocks syndrome (TBS) as well as branchio-oto-renal syndrome (BOR). Two transcript variants encoding different isoforms have been found for this gene.

== Interactions ==
SALL1 has been shown to interact with TERF1 and UBE2I.
