= Walter Vogt (embryologist) =

German embryologist

Walther or Walter Vogt (1888–1941) was a German embryologist. He was the first scientist to use vital dye to do fate mapping. In 1929, he used vital dyes to construct fate maps of amphibian embryos.
