= Fate mapping =

Technique in developmental biology

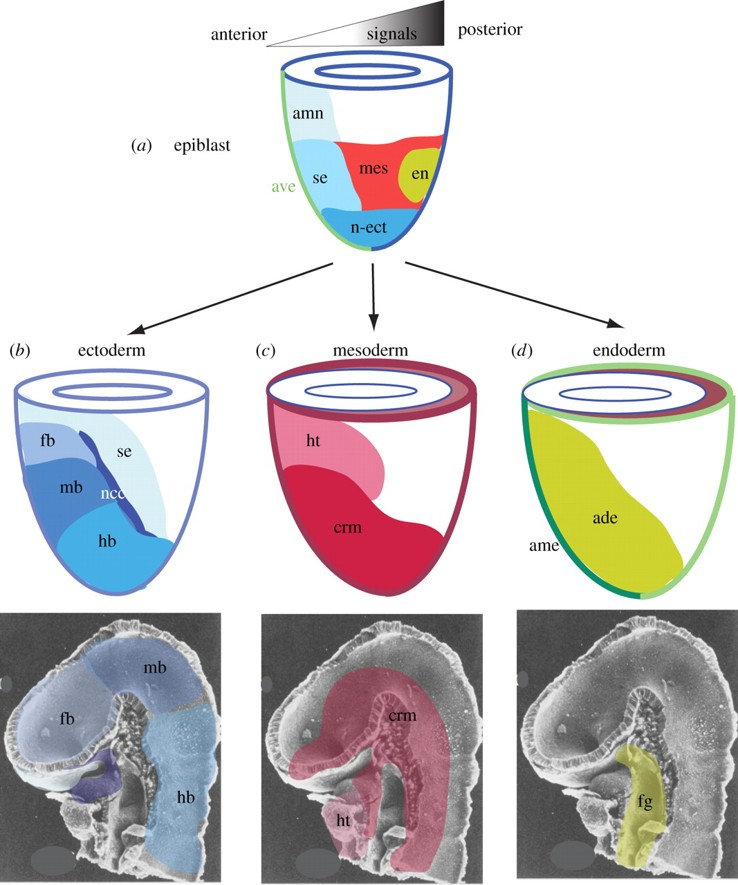
Example of a fate map

Fate mapping is a method used in developmental biology to study the embryonic origin of various adult tissues and structures. The "fate" of each cell or group of cells is mapped onto the embryo, showing which parts of the embryo will develop into which tissue. When carried out at single-cell resolution, this process is called cell lineage tracing. It is also used to trace the development of tumors. Fate mapping and cell lineage are similar methods for tracing the history of cells.

== History ==
Fate maps were created with the intent of tracing a specified region during the early developmental transition of an embryo to a distinct body structure. The first fate maps originate in the 1880s. The early fate maps in 1905 were created by Edwin Conklin and were based on direct observation of the embryos of ascidians (sea squirts) and other marine invertebrates. Modern fate mapping began in 1929 when Walter Vogt invented a process which involved marking a specific region of a developing embryo using a dyed agar chip and tracking the cells through gastrulation. To achieve this experiment, Vogt allowed dye and agar to dry on a microscope plate, and placed small pieces onto specific embryo locations. As the embryo developed, he repeated this process to analyze the movement of cells. This procedure enabled Vogt to create accurate fate maps, introducing an innovative approach to morphogenesis research. In 1978, horseradish peroxidase (HRP) was introduced as a more effective marker that required embryos to be fixed before viewing. Fate mapping can also be done through the use of molecular barcodes, which are introduced to the cell by retroviruses.

Genetic fate mapping is a technique developed in 1981 which uses a site-specific recombinase to track cell lineage genetically. This process does not require manipulating the embryo or the organ. The genetic basis of the labelling guarantees the inheritance of the marker by all offspring originating from the initially labelled cells, overcoming the issue of dilution associated with dye markers during cell division, thus offering high precision and resolution.

Overall, fate mapping serves an important tool in many fields of biology research today, such as developmental biology, stem cell research, and kidney research.

== How fate mapping differs from cell lineage ==
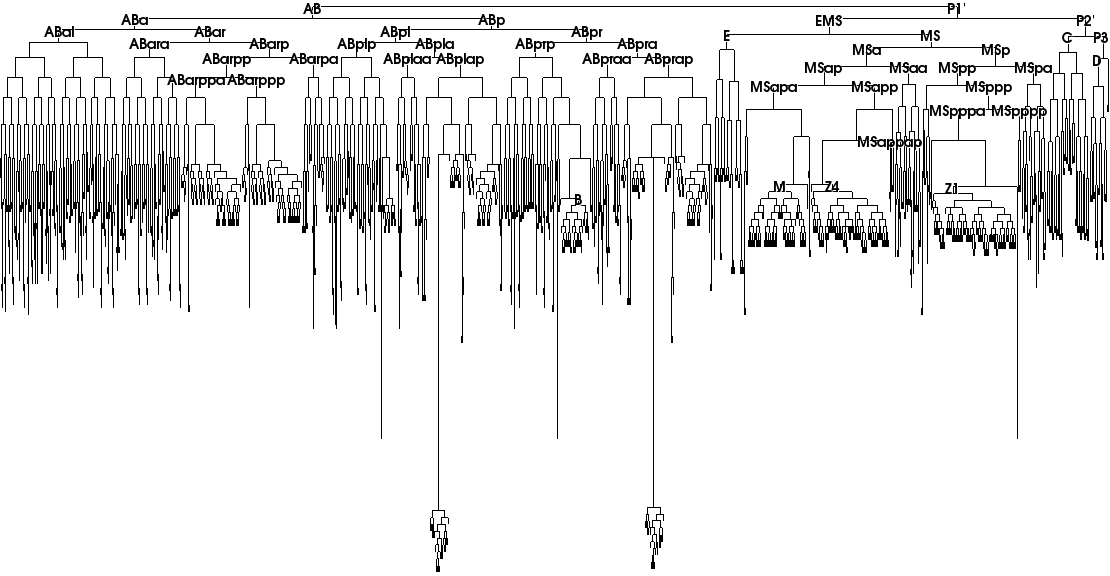
The complete cell lineage of C. elegans.

In 1905, the first experiment using cell lineage was conducted, involving tracking cells of the tunicate Styela partita. Cell lineage entails tracing a particular cell's path from one of the three germ layers. Fate mapping and cell lineage are related concepts that often overlap. For example, the development of the complete cell lineage of C. elegans can be described as the fate maps of each cell division stacked hierarchically. The distinction between the topics lies within the type of information being analyzed. Fate mapping shows which tissues come from which part of the embryo at a certain stage in development, whereas cell lineage shows the relationships between cells at each division. A cell lineage can be used to generate a fate map, and in cases like C. elegans, successive fate mapping can be used to develop a cell lineage.

== See also ==
- Cell fate determination
