= Gypsy (disambiguation) =

Gypsy or gipsy is an exonym for the Romani people.

Gypsy or gipsy (or plurals) may also refer to:

== Peoples ==
- Dom people, an ethnic group predominantly in the Middle East, North Africa and Anatolia, with origins in the Indian subcontinent
- Lom people, an ethnic group predominantly in Transcaucasia, with origins in the Indian subcontinent
- Gypsy (stereotype), the perceived character of Romani people in art and literature
- Nomad, someone with no fixed address or wanders frequently from home

== Arts and entertainment ==
=== Films ===
- Gypsies (1922 film), a Czech silent drama by Karl Anton
- Gypsy (1937 film), a drama by Roy William Neill
- Gypsy (1962 film), adaptation of the stage musical Gypsy
- The Gypsy (film), a 1975 French-Italian crime-drama film by José Giovanni
- Gypsy (1993 film), a musical starring Bette Midler
- Gypsy (2011 film), a Slovak drama
- Gypsy (2020 film), an Indian romantic road movie
- The Gypsy, 1911, with Florence Lawrence

=== Television ===
- Gypsy (TV series), a Netflix series
- Gypsy (Pakistani TV series)
- "The Gypsies", a 1966 episode of The Andy Griffith Show
- "The Gypsy", a 1966 episode of Death Valley Days
- "The Gypsies", a 1973 episode of The Waltons
- "The Gypsy", a 1985 episode of Night Court

=== Literature ===
- Gypsy (1929 play), by Maxwell Anderson
- "The Gypsy" (short story), by Agatha Christie
- The Gypsy (novel), 1992, by Steven Brust and Megan Lindholm
- Gypsy: A Memoir, a book by Gypsy Rose Lee
- The Gypsies (poem), by Alexander Pushkin
- Cyganie (Gypsies), a play by Józef Korzeniowski
- Gypsies, a 1975 book by Josef Koudelka
- Gypsy, a 1985 romance novel by Carole Mortimer
- Gypsy, a 2008 book by Lesley Pearse
- Gypsies, a novel by Robert Charles Wilson
- Gipsy (comics), a graphic novel series
- Gypsy, a 1911 play by Anthony E. Wills

=== Music ===
==== Artists ====
- Gipsy.cz, a Romani hip hop group
- Gipsy music (disambiguation)
- Gypsy (band), an American progressive rock band
- The Gypsies (Danish band), a hip hop/R&B group
- The Gypsies (Sri Lankan band)

==== Albums and EPs ====
- Gypsy (Gypsy album), 1970, by Gypsy
- Gypsies (album), 1978, by Lalo Schifrin
- Gypsy (original Broadway cast recording), an album containing a recording of the 1959 musical
- Gypsy (1962 film soundtrack), a soundtrack album for the 1962 film
- Gypsy (1993 soundtrack), for the 1993 film
- Gypsy (Eilen Jewell album), a 2019 studio album by Eilen Jewell

==== Songs ====
- "The Gypsy" (1945 song), by Billy Reid, recorded by several different artists
- "The Gypsy" (Dermot Henry song), 1972
- "Gypsy" (Fleetwood Mac song) (1982)
- "Gypsy" (Lady Gaga song) (2013)
- "Gypsy (Of a Strange and Distant Time)", 1969, by the Moody Blues
- "Gypsy" (Shakira song) (2010)
- "Gypsy" (Uriah Heep song) (1970)
- "Gypsy", by Black Sabbath from Technical Ecstasy
- "Gypsy", by Brotherhood of Man from Higher Than High
- "The Gypsy", by Deep Purple from Stormbringer
- "Gypsy", by Dio from Holy Diver
- "Gypsy", by Ektomorf from Destroy
- "Gypsy", by Emperor from In the Nightside Eclipse
- "The Gypsy", by the Irish Rovers from Emigrate! Emigrate!
- "Gypsy", by Luscious Jackson from Electric Honey
- "Gypsy", by Mercyful Fate from Don't Break the Oath
- "Gypsy", by Van Morrison from Saint Dominic's Preview
- "Gypsy", by Savoy Brown from Looking In
- "Gypsy", by Armin van Buuren from Shivers
- "Gypsy", by Suzanne Vega from Solitude Standing
- "Gypsy", from the musical Lord of the Dance

=== Other arts ===
- Gypsy (musical), a 1959 stage musical about Gypsy Rose Lee
- Cyganie (The Gypsies), an 1852 operetta by Stanisław Moniuszko
- The Gypsies, an opera by Dmitri Shostakovich
- Gypsy, a figure in contra dance choreography

=== Fictional characters ===
- Gypsy Nash, in the TV show Home and Away
- Gypsy, in the film A Bug's Life
- Gypsy (comics), in DC Comics
- Gypsy (Mystery Science Theater 3000), on Mystery Science Theater 3000
- Gipsy Danger, a Jaegar from the 2013 Sci-Fi mecha monster film Pacific Rim

== Places ==
=== United Kingdom ===
- Gipsy Hill, in London, England
- Gypsy Cove, a small bay in the Falkland Islands
- Gipsy Row, a hamlet in the county of Suffolk, England, UK

=== United States ===
- Gypsy, Kentucky, an unincorporated community
- Gipsy, Missouri, an unincorporated community
- Gypsy, Louisiana, an unincorporated community
- Gypsy, Oklahoma, an unincorporated community
- Gipsy, Pennsylvania, an unincorporated community
- Gypsy Peak, a mountain in the state of Washington
- Gypsy, West Virginia, a census-designated place

=== Elsewhere ===
- Gipsy-1, a system of adits in Tatarstan, Russia, where gypsum was mined

== Science and technology ==
- Gypsy (database), a database of mobile genetic elements
- Gypsy (software), a word processing program
- General Intensional Programming System (GIPSY), a dialect of the programming language Lucid
- Gypsy, the wheel on a windlass, typically an anchor windlass, that engages the chain being pulled

== Transport ==
- Austin Gipsy, a British off-road vehicle produced 1958–1967
- de Havilland Gipsy, a British aircraft engine designed in 1927
- HMS Gipsy, the name of several Royal Navy ships
- Gipsy-class destroyer, a Royal Navy ship class
- Gipsy Hill railway station in London, England
- Gypsy (catboat), a sailing boat
- Chotia Gypsy, an American aircraft designed in 1980
- Maruti Suzuki Gypsy, an Indian SUV introduced in 1985
- USS Gypsy (SP-55), a motor boat acquired in 1917
- USS Gypsy (ARS(D)-1), a salvage lifting vessel commissioned in 1946
- TSS Carlotta (1893), a requisitioned depot ship of the Royal Navy, renamed Gypsy just prior to being sunk in 1941
- Gypsy cab or illegal taxi operation

== People ==
=== Given name ===
- Gypsy Sunshine Buik (born 1970, now Sunny Buick), Canadian-born tattoo artist, painter
- Gipsy Daniels (1903–1967), Welsh boxer
- Gipsy Petulengro (1859–1957), British Romani businessman and broadcaster
- Gypsy Abbott (1896–1952), American silent film actress
- Gypsy Boots (1914–2004), American fitness pioneer
- Gypsy Joe (1933–2016), Puerto Rican professional wrestler
- Gypsy-Rose Blanchard (born 1991), American activist and author who murdered her mother
- Gypsy Rose Lee (1911–1970), American actress and entertainer

=== Sobriquet ===
- Gypsy (calypsonian) (born 1953), Trinidad and Tobago politician and calypsonian
- Kishansinh Chavda or Gypsy (1904–1979), Gujarati author
- GypsyCrusader (Paul Miller, born 1988), often referred to as "Gypsy", American political commentator, activist, and streamer
- Keerati Mahaplearkpong, Thai actress nicknamed "Gypsy"
- Gipsy Smith (1860–1947), British evangelist

== Other uses ==
- Gipsy (dog), a large, long-lived dog buried in Brooklyn, New York, US
- Gipsies Football Club, a 19th-century rugby football club
- Bohemian F.C. or the Gypsies, a professional Irish association football club

== See also ==
- Gyp (disambiguation)
- Gypsey (disambiguation)
- Gypsy cop or wandering officer
- Gypsy moth (disambiguation)
- Gypsy music (disambiguation)
- Indian nomads (disambiguation)
- Itinerant (disambiguation)
- Nomad (disambiguation)
- Spanish Gypsy (disambiguation)
- USS Gypsy, a list of U.S. Navy ships
- Wanderer (disambiguation)
