= Nomad (disambiguation) =

A nomad is a member of a people, or species, that moves from place to place.

Nomad may also refer to:

== Places ==
- Nomad, Michigan, an unincorporated community
- Nomad, Papua New Guinea, a major centre of the Middle Fly District of Western Province of Papua New Guinea
  - Nomad Rural LLG, in Papua New Guinea
- NoMad, Manhattan, a neighborhood in New York City
  - The NoMad, a hotel/restaurant in the neighborhood

== Books and magazines ==
- Nomad (Marvel Comics), a series of characters from the Marvel Universe
- Nomad (magazine), an American literary magazine
- Nomad (novel), a 1950 science fiction novel by George O. Smith
- Nomad: From Islam to America, a 2010 autobiographical book by Ayaan Hirsi Ali
- The Nomad, a novel in the Tribe of One series by Simon Hawke
- Alan Partridge: Nomad, a 2016 autobiography by fictional broadcaster Alan Partridge
- Nomad (poetry collection), 2022 poetry collection by Nigerian poet and essayist Romeo Oriogun

== Films and television ==
- Nomad (1982 film), a Hong Kong film starring Leslie Cheung
- Nomads (1986 film), an urban horror film set in Los Angeles
- Nomad (2005 film), a historical epic set in Kazakhstan
- Nomads (2010 film), a drama film
- Nomad (upcoming film), an upcoming science fiction film
- Nomads (film series), a Canadian virtual reality documentary project
- Nomad: In the Footsteps of Bruce Chatwin, a 2019 documentary directed by Werner Herzog
- Nomad (Star Trek), the name of a robot in the Star Trek episode "The Changeling"
- Nomad the Naturalist, pseudonym of Norman Ellison, author and presenter of BBC Children's Hour radio programmes
- Nomads (TV series), a Greek reality competition television series
- The Nomads (2019 film), a sports drama set in Philadelphia
- The Nomads (1976 film), an Algerian film directed by Sid Ali Mazif

== Games ==
- Sega Nomad, video game console
- The main character in the 2007 PC videogame Crysis by Crytek
- A hostile alien faction in Freelancer
- Nomad, or Project Nomad, a 1993 DOS game
- A vehicle in the video game Mass Effect: Andromeda
- Main character in Tom Clancy's Ghost Recon Wildlands and Tom Clancy's Ghost Recon Breakpoint (codename "Nomad")
- An operative in Call of Duty: Black Ops III (callsign "Nomad")
- A Moroccan operator in Tom Clancy's Rainbow Six Siege

== Music ==
=== Albums ===
- Nomad (Jesse Cook album), 2003, and the title track
- Nomadic (Adriana Evans album), 2004
- Nomad (Tribal Tech album), 1990
- Nomad (Mike Tramp album), 2015
- Nomad (Darkestrah album), 2024
- Nomad, a 2000 album by Paul Di'Anno
- Nomad, an album by Lotus (2004)
- Nomad, an album by Adam Plack recording under the name Nomad with Robert Mirabal, Mor Thiam, and Jason Baker
- Nomad, an album by Bombino (2013)
- Nomad, an album by Sky Architect (2017)
- Nomad (EP), a 2024 EP by NOMAD

=== Songs ===
- "Nomad", by Sepultura from Chaos A.D.
- "Nomad", by Youngblood Supercult
- "Nomad", by Buckingham-Nicks, recorded as a demo in 1974 and published in 2001, under the name Candlebright, by Stevie Nicks from Trouble in Shangri-La
- "Nomad", by Walk Off the Earth
- "Nomad", a jazz instrumental written by Duke Pearson and recorded by many others
- "The Nomad", by Iron Maiden from Brave New World
- "Nomad", by Zion.T and Gen Hoshino from Shang-Chi and the Legend of the Ten Rings: The Album

=== Performers ===
- Nomad (British band), a British duo, the artist of "(I Wanna Give You) Devotion"
- Nomad (New Zealand band), a Kiwi pop band, best known for the song "Oh My My"
- NOMAD (group), a South Korean idol group
- The Nomad (New Zealand Music Producer), New Zealand electronic music producer, DJ and videographer
- The Nomads (Swedish band), a Swedish rock band
- The Nomads (Texas band), an American band

== Sport ==
- Anstey Nomads F.C., an amateur football (soccer) club from Leicestershire, England
- Connah's Quay Nomads F.C., a Welsh football club based in Connah's Quay, Flintshire
- Nomads Auction Manila, a football (soccer) club based in the Philippines
- Nomads R.F.C., a rugby football club based in Hong Kong
- Nomads United, a New Zealand soccer club based in Christchurch
- Nomads Women's rugby team, an international invitational women's rugby team
- North Winnipeg Nomads Football Club, an amateur Canadian football club in Winnipeg, Manitoba
- Shavkat Rakhmonov, Kazakh mixed martial artist; nicknamed "Nomad"

== Technology ==
- Nomad Goods, a consumer electronics accessory company in Santa Barbara, CA
- Nomad Health, an online marketplace for freelance clinical jobs
- Nadir and Occultation for Mars Discovery (NOMAD), an instrument on the ExoMars Trace Gas Orbiter
- Nomad rover, an unmanned vehicle designed as a test for such a vehicle to ride on other planets
- NOMAD (software), a computer database and inquiry language
- Creative NOMAD, a range of digital audio players designed and sold by Creative Technology
- Navy oceanographic meteorological automatic device (NOMAD), offshore weather buoy
- Wireless Nomad, an internet cooperative based in Toronto, Canada
- Nomad, software for scheduling and deployment of tasks developed by HashiCorp
- Nomad (eSIM company), a company selling eSIMs

== Transportation ==
=== Aircraft ===
- CH-112 Nomad, a variant of the Hiller OH-23 Raven helicopter used by Canadian military
- Delta Sailplane Nomad, an American motorglider
- GAF Nomad, an Australian short-take-off-and-landing (STOL) aircraft produced from 1975 to 1985
- Gin Nomad, a South Korean paraglider design
- A-17 Nomad, an attack bomber produced in 1935
- PBN Nomad, a variant of the PBY Catalina flying boat
- Stanley Nomad, a glider
- Napier Nomad, aircraft engine

=== Motor vehicles ===
- Chevrolet Nomad, a station wagon produced by the Chevrolet Motor Division of the General Motors Corporation from 1955 to 1961
- Suzuki Escudo Nomad, a sport utility vehicle
- Nomads (motorcycle club), an outlaw motorcycle club in Australia
- Nomad (motorcycle club membership), a member of a motorcycle club

=== Ships ===
- SS Nomadic (1911), a ship of the White Star line and tender for the RMS Titanic
- USS Nomad (SP-1046), a US Navy patrol boat in commission from 1917 to 1918
- HMS Nomad, a British Royal Navy destroyer launched in February 1916 and sunk in May 1916

=== Other uses in transportation ===
- Nomad, branding for the public transport services in the French region of Normandy, including TER Normandie and the former Normandy intercity lines

== Other uses ==
- Nomad (animation studio), a Japanese animation company
- Nominated adviser of the London Stock Exchange Alternative Investment Market
- Nomad (Dragonfly), a species of dragonfly

== See also ==
- Monad (disambiguation)
