= Gypsey (disambiguation) =

Gypsey (often considered a pejorative), is an exonym for the Romani people, an ethnic group of South Asian origin.

Gypsey may also refer to:

- Gypsey (spring), an intermittent spring or stream
- Gypsey Race, a small river in Yorkshire

== See also ==
- Gypsy (disambiguation)
- Gipsey Bridge, hamlet in Thornton le Fen, Lincolnshire, UK
- Spanish Gypsy (disambiguation)
