= AAC/AAD leader =

Disputed genetic element

Putative aminoglycoside riboswitch / attI site

Identifiers
- Symbol: AAC_AAD_leader
- Rfam: RF02912

Other data
- PDB structures: PDBe

The AAC/AAD 5' leader is a disputed genetic element that was proposed to be a conserved RNA structure that is found upstream of the bacterial aminoglycosides antibiotic-resistant genes and that functions as an aminoglycoside-specific riboswitch. The putative RNA is upstream of aminoglycoside acetyl transferase (AAC) and aminoglycoside adenyl transferase (AAD) genes.

According to the initial report, it has a short open reading frame (ORF) that encodes a leader peptide upstream of the resistance gene. A 75-nucleotide-long sequence from the first ribosome binding site up to the coding sequence appeared to have the regulatory role, and it was considered the minimal functional RNA. The proposed model is that aminoglycosides bind to specific regions of AAC/AAD 5' leader and induce change in the RNA structure, thereby inducing expression of the resistance protein encoded by the downstream gene. Results in the initial report are that the leader RNA is widely distributed among antibiotic-resistant bacterial pathogens.

A subsequent letter disputed these claims. This letter stated that the proposed riboswitch matches the attI site, which is a previously known part of integrons and is a signal for recombination, a frequent process in integrons. The letter further stated, among other points, that the putative riboswitch lacks additional conserved features beyond those previously established for attI, that the riboswitch/attI are also associated with genes that confer resistance to antibiotics unrelated to aminoglycosides (or encode other unrelated proteins), and the letter proposed that the results of the original paper could be explained by a previously elucidated mechanism involving the ORF. The authors of the original paper published a response to this letter.
