= Mobilome =

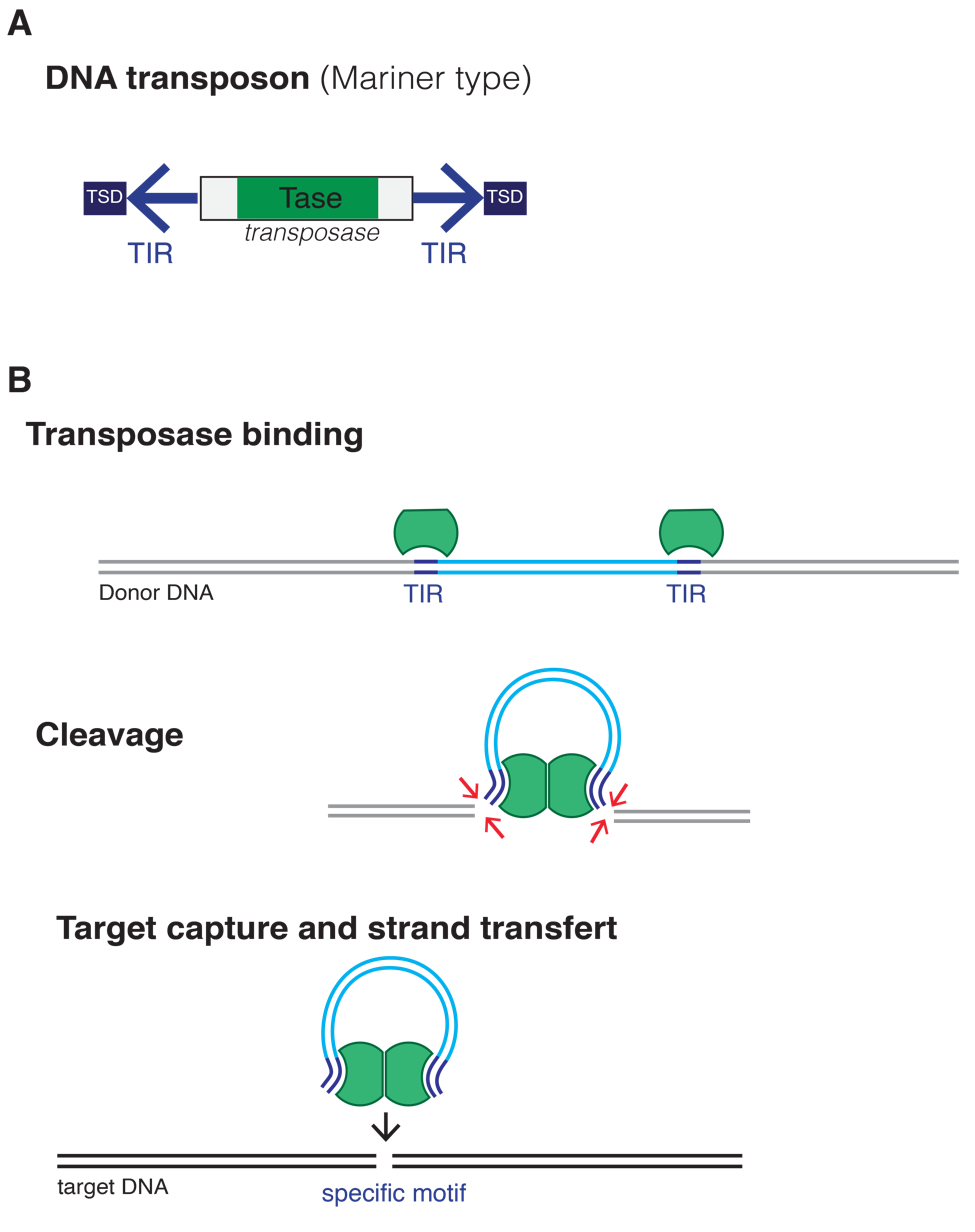
(A) Transposable elements are flanked by inverted tandem repeats (TIRs). (B) Transposases cleave the transposable element at the TIRs. The free transposable element inserts into another part of the genome.

The mobilome is the entire set of mobile genetic elements in a genome. Mobilomes are found in eukaryotes, prokaryotes, and viruses. The compositions of mobilomes differ among lineages of life, with transposable elements being the major mobile elements in eukaryotes, and plasmids and prophages being the major types in prokaryotes. Virophages contribute to the viral mobilome.

== Mobilome in eukaryotes ==
Transposable elements are elements that can move about or propagate within the genome, and are the major constituents of the eukaryotic mobilome. Transposable elements can be regarded as genetic parasites because they exploit the host cell's transcription and translation mechanisms to extract and insert themselves in different parts of the genome, regardless of the phenotypic effect on the host.

Eukaryotic transposable elements were first discovered in maize (Zea mays) in which kernels showed a dotted color pattern. Barbara McClintock described the maize Ac/Ds system in which the Ac locus promotes the excision of the Ds locus from the genome, and excised Ds elements can mutate genes responsible for pigment production by inserting into their coding regions.

Other examples of transposable elements include: yeast (Saccharomyces cerevisiae) Ty elements, a retrotransposon which encodes a reverse transcriptase to convert its mRNA transcript into DNA which can then insert into other parts of the genome; and fruit fly (Drosophila melanogaster) P-elements, which randomly inserts into the genome to cause mutations in germ line cells, but not in somatic cells.

== Mobilome in prokaryotes ==
Bacterial conjugation. (1) Production of pilus. (2) Pilus connects two bacteria. (3) One strand of plasmid DNA moves into the recipient. (4) Both bacteria contain identical plasmids.

Plasmids were discovered in the 1940s as genetic materials outside of bacterial chromosomes. Prophages are genomes of bacteriophages (a type of virus) that are inserted into bacterial chromosomes; prophages can then be spread to other bacteria through the lytic cycle and lysogenic cycle of viral replication.

While transposable elements are also found in prokaryotic genomes, the most common mobile genetic elements in the prokaryotic genome are plasmids and prophages.

Plasmids and prophages can move between genomes through bacterial conjugation, allowing horizontal gene transfer. Plasmids often carry genes that are responsible for bacterial antibiotic resistance; as these plasmids replicate and pass from one genome to another, the whole bacterial population can quickly adapt to the antibiotic. Prophages can loop out of bacterial chromosomes to produce bacteriophages that go on to infect other bacteria with the prophages; this allows prophages to propagate quickly among the bacterial population, to the harm of the bacterial host.

== Mobilome in viruses ==
Discovered in 2008 in a strain of Acanthamoeba castellanii mimivirus, virophages are an element of the virus mobilome. Virophages are viruses that replicate only when host cells are co-infected with helper viruses. Following co-infection, helper viruses exploit the host cell's transcription/translation machinery to produce their own machinery; virophages replicate through the machinery of either the host cell or the viruses. The replication of virophages can negatively impact the replication of helper viruses.

Sputnik and mavirus are examples of virophages.
