= Nomadic (disambiguation) =

Nomadic is anything related to a nomad, a habitually wandering person

Nomadic may also refer to:

- SS Nomadic (1911), a tender ship used to ferry passengers
- SS Nomadic (1891), a livestock ship owned by White Star Line
- Nomadic (company), an American virtual reality entertainment company
- Nomadic (Sonny Simmons & Moksha Samnyasin album), a 2014 album by jazz musician Sonny Simmons
- Nomadic, a 2013 EP by the American band Fallujah

== See also ==
- Knowmadic, Somali-Canadian youth activist
- Nomad (disambiguation)
