= Genomic island =

Part of a genome that has evidence of horizontal origins

A genomic island (GI) is part of a genome that has evidence of horizontal origins. The term is usually used in microbiology, especially with regard to bacteria. A GI can code for many functions, can be involved in symbiosis or pathogenesis, and may help an organism's adaptation. Many sub-classes of GIs exist that are based on the function that they confer. For example, a GI associated with pathogenesis is often called a pathogenicity island (PAIs), while GIs that contain many antibiotic resistant genes are referred to as antibiotic resistance islands. The same GI can occur in distantly related species as a result of various types of horizontal gene transfer (transformation, conjugation, transduction). This can be determined by base composition analysis, as well as phylogeny estimations.

== Computational prediction ==
Various genomic island predictions programs have been developed. These tools can be broadly grouped into sequence based methods and comparative genomics/phylogeny based methods.

Sequence based methods depend on the naturally occurring variation that exists between the genome sequence composition of different species. Genomic regions that show abnormal sequence composition (such as nucleotide bias or codon bias) suggests that these regions may have been horizontally transferred. Two major problems with these methods are that false predictions can occur due to natural variation in the genome (sometimes due to highly expressed genes) and that horizontally transferred DNA will ameliorate (change to the host genome) over time; therefore, limiting predictions to only recently acquired GIs.

Comparative genomics based methods try to identify regions that show signs that they have been horizontally transferred using information from several related species. For example, a genomic region that is present in one species, but is not present in several other related species suggests that the region may have been horizontally transferred. The alternative explanations are (i) that the region was present in the common ancestor but has been lost in all the other species being compared, or (ii) that the region was absent in the common ancestor but was acquired through mutation and selection in the species in which it is still found. The argument for multiple deletions of the region would be strengthened if there is evidence from outgroups that the region was present in the common ancestor, or if the phylogeny implies relatively few actual deletion events would be required. The argument for acquisition via mutation would be strengthened if the species with the region is known to have diverged substantially from the other species, or if the region in question is small. The plausibility of either (i) or (ii) would be modified if taxon sampling omitted many extinct species that may have possessed the region, and particularly if extinction was correlated with the presence of the region.

One example of a method that integrates several of the most accurate GI prediction methods is IslandViewer.

== Examples ==
In bacteria, many type III and type IV secretion systems are located on genomic islands. These "islands" are characterised by their large size(>10 Kb), their frequent association with tRNA-encoding genes and a different G+C content compared with the rest of the genome. Many genomic islands are flanked by repeat structures and carry fragments of other mobile elements such as phages and plasmids. Some genomic islands, including those adjacent to integrative and conjugative elements (ICEs), can excise themselves spontaneously from the chromosome and can be transferred to other suitable recipients. While excision is dependent on the ICE machinery present, integration is attributed to integrases present on the genomic islands.
