= Call Me Back =

Call Me Back may refer to:

- Call Me Back (single album), by NOMAD
- "Call Me Back", a song by John Farnham
- "Call Me Back", a song by Paul Curtis
- "Call Me Back", a song by The Strokes from Angles
- "Call Me Back", a song by Tanya Stephens
- "Call Me Back", a song by Young the Giant from Mirror Master
