= Gypsy Woman =

Gypsy Woman may refer to:

- Gypsy Woman (film), a 2001 film by Steven Knight
- "Gypsy Woman" (Crystal Waters song), from the album Surprise (1991)
- "Gypsy Woman" (The Impressions song), a 1961 #2 R&B song written by Curtis Mayfield and performed by The Impressions; a 1970 Brian Hyland cover was a #3 pop hit
- Gypsy Woman (EP), an EP by Eleni Foureira, featuring the Crystal Waters song
- "Gypsy Woman", a song by Hilary Duff from the album Dignity (2007)

== See also ==
- Gypsy (disambiguation)
