= ACLAME =

Content
- Description: CLAssification of mobile genetic elements

Contact
- Research center: Université Libre de Bruxelles
- Laboratory: Bioinformatique des Génomes et des Réseaux
- Primary citation: PMID 19933762

Access
- Website: http://aclame.ulb.ac.be

Tools
- Web: BLAST

ACLAME (The CLAssification of Mobile genetic Elements) is a database of sequenced mobile genetic elements.

== See also ==
- Gypsy (database)
- Mobile genetic elements
