= Indian nomads =

Ethnic groups of India, known as "gypsies":

- Domba
- Banjara

== See also ==
- Gypsy (disambiguation)
