= USS Gypsy =

USS Gypsy has been the name of more than one United States Navy ship, and may refer to:

- USS Gypsy (SP-55), a motor boat acquired in 1917 for use as a patrol boat which burned during fitting out before being commissioned.
- USS Gypsy (ARS(D)-1), originally designated USS LSM-549, a salvage lifting vessel in commission from 1946 to 1948 and from 1951 to 1955
