= ATBO =

South Korean boy band (2022–2025)

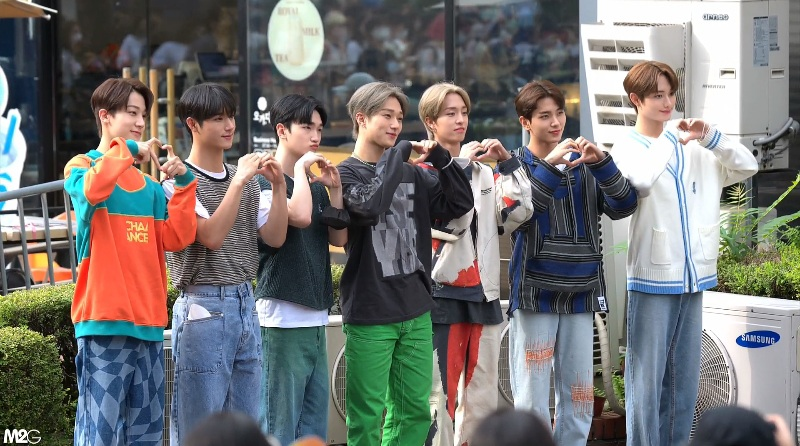
- ATBO in August 2022; L–R: Hyunjun, Seunghwan, Yeonkyu, Junseok, Rakwon, Junmin, and Won Bin

Background information
- Origin: Seoul, South Korea
- Genre: K-pop
- Years active: 2022–2025
- Label: IST
- Past members: Rakwon; Junseok; Junmin; Hyunjun; Seunghwan; Yeonkyu; Won Bin

ATBO (Korean: 에이티비오; RR: Eitibio; an acronym for At The Beginning of Originality) was a South Korean boy group formed through IST Entertainment's survival competition The Origin – A, B, Or What? in 2022. The group consisted of six members: Junseok, Junmin, Hyunjun, Seunghwan, Yeonkyu, and Won Bin. Originally a septet, Rakwon left the group on May 6, 2024, due to health issues. They debuted on July 27, 2022, with the extended play (EP) The Beginning: 開花, and disbanded on December 17, 2025.

== Name ==
"ATBO" is an initial of At The Beginning of Originality which means the start of a dream. The name was originally "ABO", but was changed due to fan concern as the original name is a racial slur in some regions.

== History ==
On February 6, 2022, it was reported that IST Entertainment, home to male idol groups Victon and The Boyz as well as female idol group Apink and Weeekly, was planning to debut their first boy group under the new company name in the first half of the year. The members would be selected from a group of 13 trainees through a survival program called The Origin - A, B, Or What?, jointly produced with Kakao Entertainment and Sony Music Solutions.

The line-up, consisting of the seven contestants Junseok, Junmin, Hyunjun, Donghwa, Rakwon, Seunghwan and Yeonkyu, was determined on the final episode aired on May 7, 2022, alongside the debut name, ABO, which was later changed to ATBO. Junmin and Rakwon were SM Entertainment trainees, the latter also being a former child model, while Yeonkyu was a YG Entertainment trainee who participated in YG Treasure Box, but did not make it into the show's final debut lineup.

On June 13, 2022, IST Entertainment announced that Donghwa would not be debuting as a member of ATBO after his past misconduct when he was a student surfaced online. Won Bin, who was originally eliminated in episode 5, replaced him in the group.

ATBO debuted on July 27, 2022, with the EP, The Beginning: 開花.

On May 6, 2024, IST announced that Rakwon would be leaving the group due to health issues dating back to March. On June 27, the group collaborated with Just B to form the project boy group The CrewOne. The project group then joined Mnet's competition program Road to Kingdom: Ace of Ace, which premiered on September 19, 2024.

On December 17, 2025, IST entertainment announced that its exclusive contracts with the members have been terminated, thereby confirming the group's disbandment.

== Members ==
- Junseok (준석) – leader, rapper, dancer
- Junmin (준민) – vocalist
- Hyunjun (현준) – rapper
- Seunghwan (승환) – vocalist, dancer
- Yeonkyu (연규) – vocalist
- Won Bin (원빈) – rapper, vocalist
- Rakwon (락원) – vocalist, dancer

== Discography ==
=== Extended plays ===
List of extended plays, showing selected details, selected chart positions, and sales figures
Title	Details	Peak chart positions	Sales
Title	Details	KOR	Sales
The Beginning: 開花	Released: July 27, 2022; Label: IST, Kakao; Formats: CD, digital download, streaming; Track listing: 1. "7ibe (Vibe)"; 2. "Monochrome (Color)"; 3. "Graffiti"; 4. "High Five"; 5. "WoW"; 6. "Run"	6	KOR: 66,212
The Beginning: 始作	Released: October 26, 2022; Label: IST, Kakao; Formats: CD, digital download, streaming; Track listing: 1. "Attitude"; 2. "Time to Go!"; 3. "Magic"; 4. "Boost"; 5. "The Way"; 6. "Good Vibes Only"	5	KOR: 87,009
The Beginning: 飛上	Released: May 18, 2023; Label: IST, Kakao; Formats: CD, digital download, streaming; Track listing: 1. "Next to Me"; 2. "Bounce"; 3. "Just Dance"; 4. "사랑해줘"; 5. "Good Thing" (굿 띵), 6. "Just for Us" (저스트 포 어스)	5	KOR: 66,230
Must Have	Released: November 27, 2023; Label: IST, Kakao; Formats: CD, digital download, streaming	9	KOR: 64,628

=== Singles ===
Title	Year	Peak position	Album
Title	Year	KOR DL	Album
"Monochrome (Color)"	2022	147	The Beginning: 開花
"Attitude"	2022	116	The Beginning: 始作
"Next to Me"	2023	186	The Beginning: 飛上
"Must Have Love"	2023	163	Must Have

== Videography ==
=== Music videos ===
List of songs, showing year released, name of the directors, and the length of the music videos
Title	Year	Director(s)	Length	Ref.
"Monochrome (Color)"	2022	Gibeak Lee (BOLD)	3:58	
"Attitude"	2022	Jimmy (VIA)	3:40	
"Next To Me"	2023	Haansol Rim (Haans)	3:45	
"Must Have Love"	2023	Jimmy (VIA)	3:16	

== Filmography ==
=== Television shows ===
Year	Title	Notes	Ref.
2022	The Origin – A, B, Or What?	Survival show determining ATBO's members	
2022	ATBO Walkshop	Reality show	

== Ambassadorship ==
- PR Ambassador for Korea Forest Love Youth Boys (2023)

== Awards and nominations ==
Name of the award ceremony, year presented, award category, nominee(s) of the award, and the result of the nomination
Award ceremony	Year	Category	Nominee(s)/work(s)	Result	Ref.
Asia Artist Awards	2022	Focus Award	ATBO	Won	
Asia Model Awards	2022	Rookie of the Year – Singer	ATBO	Won	
Asia Star Entertainer Awards	2024	Hot Trend	ATBO	Won	
Genie Music Awards	2022	Best Male Rookie Award	ATBO	Nominated	
K-Global Heart Dream Awards	2023	K-Global Next Leader Award	ATBO	Won	
MAMA Awards	2022	Best New Male Artist	ATBO	Nominated	
MAMA Awards	2022	Artist of the Year	ATBO	Longlisted	
