= Gypsy (database) =

Database of mobile genetic elements

GyDB of mobile genetic elements:

Content
- Description: Mobile genetic elements

Contact
- Primary citation: PMID 21036865
- Release date: 2010

Access
- Data format: Wiki
- Website: http://gydb.org.
- Web service URL: mediawiki api

Tools
- Web: wiki

Miscellaneous
- Version: release 2.0.

Gypsy (GyDB) is a wiki-style database of mobile genetic elements.

== See also ==
- Classification of mobile genetic elements
- Horizontal gene transfer
