= Integrative and conjugative element =

Mobile genetic elements

Integrative and conjugative elements (ICEs) are mobile genetic elements present in both Gram-positive and Gram-negative bacteria. In a donor cell, ICEs are located primarily on the chromosome, but have the ability to excise themselves from the genome and transfer to recipient cells via bacterial conjugation.

Due to their physical association with chromosomes, identifying integrative and conjugative elements has proven challenging, but in silico analysis of bacterial genomes indicate these elements are widespread among many microorganisms.

ICEs have been detected in Pseudomonadota (e.g., Pseudomonas spp., Aeromonas spp., E. coli, Haemophilus spp.), Actinomycetota and Bacillota. Among many other virulence determinants, ICEs may spread antibiotic and metal ion resistance genes across prokaryotic phyla. In addition, ICE elements may also facilitate the mobilisation of other DNA modules such as genomic islands.

== Characteristics ==
Although ICEs exhibit various mechanisms promoting their integration, transfer and regulation, they share many common characteristics. ICEs comprise all mobile genetic elements with self-replication, integration, and conjugation abilities, including conjugative transposons, regardless of the particular conjugation and integration mechanism by which they act. Some immobile genomic pathogenicity islands are also believed to be defective ICEs that have lost their ability to conjugate.

ICEs combine certain features of the following mobile genetic elements:

- Bacteriophages that have the ability to insert into and excise from bacterial chromosomes.
- Transposons that, besides their inherent transposable activity, can additionally be subject to horizontal gene transfer via conjugation.
- Conjugative plasmids that transfer from donor to recipient bacteria via conjugation.

In contrast to plasmids and phages, integrative and conjugative elements cannot remain in an extrachromosomal form in the cytoplasm of bacterial cells and replicate only with the chromosome they reside in.

ICEs possess the structure organized into three gene modules that are responsible for their integration with the chromosome, excision from the genome and conjugation, as well as regulatory genes. All integrative and conjugative elements encode integrases that are essential for controlling the excision, transfer and integration of an ICE. The representative example of ICE integrases is the integrase encoded by lambda phage. The transfer of an integrated ICE element from the donor to recipient bacterium must be preceded by its excision from the chromosome that is co-promoted by small DNA-binding proteins, the so-called recombination directionality factors. The dynamics of the integration and excision processes are specific to each integrative and conjugative element.
