= The Origin – A, B, Or What? =

South Korean television program

- Promotional poster
- Created by: IST Entertainment; Kakao Entertainment; Sony Music Entertainment Japan
- Presented by: Park Seon-young
- Country of origin: South Korea
- Original language: Korean
- No. of seasons: 1
- No. of episodes: 8

Production
- Running time: 60 minutes; 90 minutes (finale)
- Production companies: IST Entertainment; Dragon Sky; Honey Zam

Original release
- Network: MBN; KakaoTV; 1theK; Music On! TV; AbemaTV
- Release: March 19 – May 7, 2022

The Origin – A, B, Or What? (Korean: 디 오리진) is a 2022 survival program created by IST Entertainment in association with its parent company, Kakao Entertainment, and Sony Music Entertainment Japan. It aired on MBN, Kakao TV and 1theK YouTube channel on March 19, 2022, every Saturday at 18:00 (KST) timeslot for eight episodes. In the finale on May 7, 2022, the show announced the final 7 members who would debut as ATBO.

== Background and concept ==
On February 6, it was reported that IST Entertainment, home to male idol groups Victon and The Boyz as well as female idol group Apink and Weeekly, is making their first boy group under the new company name in the first half of the year.

On February 10, It was announced that IST will be forming their boy group under a survival program titled, The Origin – A, B, Or What?. It will be jointly produced with Kakao Entertainment and Sony Music Solutions. The show will consist of 13 contestants.

On February 22, IST announced that the premiere date was postponed from February 26 to March 19 due to some trainees testing positive for COVID-19.

== Cast ==
The show is presented by Park Seon-young. Meanwhile, the judges, dubbed as "balancers", are:

- Jay B
- Minzy
- Sungkyu
- Kwak Yoon-young
- Hwang Kyu-hong

Guests

- The Boyz (Episode 3)
- Jay Park (Special Balancer, Episode 6–7)
- Apink's Bomi, Hayoung (Special Balancer, Episode 6–7)
- Victon's Sejun, Subin (Special Balancer, Episode 6–7)

== Contestants ==
Color key:

Final members of ATBØ
Eliminated in the final episode
Eliminated in Survival Balance
Eliminated in PR Balance

13 contestants
Jeong Seunghwan (정승환)	Oh Junseok (오준석)	Seok Rakwon (석락원)	Ryu Junmin (류준민)
Bae Hyunjun (배현준)	Yang Donghwa (양동화)	Kim Yeonkyu (김연규)	Choi Jinwook (최진욱)
Jeong Junho (정준호)	Kim Minseo (김민서)	Park Jaehoon (박재훈)	Won Bin (원빈)
Kang Daehyun (강대현)

== Profile ==
The ages of all contestants are presented in accordance with the international age system as of Episode 1 (March 19, 2022).

Name	Hangul	Birth date	Training period (Note: Based on Episode 1.)	Notes
Jeong Jun-ho	정준호	July 11, 2002 (age 19)	2 years 2 months	A former SM Entertainment trainee.
Kim Min-seo	김민서	January 11, 2003 (age 19)	2 years 8 months	Lived in China for ten years.
Oh Jun-seok	오준석	March 3, 2003 (age 19)	3 years	
Ryu Jun-min	류준민	April 5, 2003 (age 18)	2 years	A former SM Entertainment trainee.
Choi Jin-wook	최진욱	May 20, 2003 (age 18)	2 years 8 months	
Bae Hyun-jun	배현준	June 6, 2003 (age 18)	2 years	
Kang Dae-hyun	강대현	July 15, 2003 (age 18)	2 years 4 months	
Yang Dong-hwa	양동화	August 19, 2003 (age 18)	2 years 9 months	
Seok Rak-won	석락원	November 14, 2003 (age 18)	2 years 10 months	A former SM Entertainment trainee. Former child model.
Jeong Seung-hwan	정승환	January 24, 2004 (age 18)	A year 9 months	He was born in Busan.
Kim Yeon-kyu	김연규	May 3, 2004 (age 17)	11 months (Note: At the current company.)	A former YG Entertainment trainee. A former contestant on YG Treasure Box.
Won Bin	원빈	July 1, 2004 (age 17)	2 years 5 months	Lived in the Philippines for over ten years.
Park Jae-hoon	박재훈	July 20, 2005 (age 16)	5 months	The youngest of the trainees.

== Missions ==
=== PR Balance ===
Teams were formed prior Episode 1. There are two rounds to this mission.

The Death participant from the losing team will be eliminated. Both teams' Aces received the benefit to lead and form the teams for the next mission.

Color key

Winning team

Leader

Ace

Death

Leader & Ace

PR Balance (episode 1–2)
Round 1			Round 2			Team	Votes (Note: Out of 224; Votes from Round 1 and Round 2 combined)	Contestants
Performance			Performance			Team	Votes	Contestants
Order	Original artist(s)	Song	Order	Original artist(s)	Song	Team	Votes	Contestants
1	BTS	"Mic Drop"	2	BM	"13IVI"	Team A (Note: Death participant was not revealed.)	118 (52.68%)	Choi Jinwook
1	BTS	"Mic Drop"	2	BM	"13IVI"	Team A	118 (52.68%)	Park Jaehoon
1	BTS	"Mic Drop"	2	BM	"13IVI"	Team A	118 (52.68%)	Ryu Junmin
1	BTS	"Mic Drop"	2	BM	"13IVI"	Team A	118 (52.68%)	Seok Rakwon
1	BTS	"Mic Drop"	2	BM	"13IVI"	Team A	118 (52.68%)	Won Bin
1	BTS	"Mic Drop"	2	BM	"13IVI"	Team A	118 (52.68%)	Yang Donghwa
2	Ateez	"Hala-Hala"	1	GD & TOP	"Zutter"	Team B	106 (47.32%)	Bae Hyunjun
2	Ateez	"Hala-Hala"	1	GD & TOP	"Zutter"	Team B	106 (47.32%)	Jeong Junho
2	Ateez	"Hala-Hala"	1	GD & TOP	"Zutter"	Team B	106 (47.32%)	Jeong Seunghwan
2	Ateez	"Hala-Hala"	1	GD & TOP	"Zutter"	Team B	106 (47.32%)	Kang Daehyun
2	Ateez	"Hala-Hala"	1	GD & TOP	"Zutter"	Team B	106 (47.32%)	Kim Minseo
2	Ateez	"Hala-Hala"	1	GD & TOP	"Zutter"	Team B	106 (47.32%)	Kim Yeonkyu
2	Ateez	"Hala-Hala"	1	GD & TOP	"Zutter"	Team B	106 (47.32%)	Oh Junseok

=== Concept Balance ===
Teams were formed in Episode 2.

The losing team, with the exception of the Ace, and the Death participant of the winning team will be eliminated.

Like the previous round, the selected Aces also automatically led and formed the new teams for the next round.

Color key

Winning team

Leader

Ace

Death

Concept Balance (episode 3–4)
Performance		Team	Votes (Note: Out of 114)	Contestants
Original artist(s)	Song	Team	Votes	Contestants
The Boyz	"The Stealer"	Team A	63 (55.26%)	Choi Jinwook
The Boyz	"The Stealer"	Team A	63 (55.26%)	Jeong Junho
The Boyz	"The Stealer"	Team A	63 (55.26%)	Kim Yeonkyu
The Boyz	"The Stealer"	Team A	63 (55.26%)	Oh Junseok
The Boyz	"The Stealer"	Team A	63 (55.26%)	Won Bin
The Boyz	"The Stealer"	Team A	63 (55.26%)	Seok Rakwon
The Boyz	"Thrill Ride"	Team B	51 (44.74%)	Bae Hyunjun
The Boyz	"Thrill Ride"	Team B	51 (44.74%)	Jeong Seunghwan
The Boyz	"Thrill Ride"	Team B	51 (44.74%)	Kim Minseo
The Boyz	"Thrill Ride"	Team B	51 (44.74%)	Park Jaehoon
The Boyz	"Thrill Ride"	Team B	51 (44.74%)	Ryu Junmin
The Boyz	"Thrill Ride"	Team B	51 (44.74%)	Yang Donghwa

The ace card of the losing team exchange fates with the death card of the winning team making Ryu Junmin part of the saved members and Won Bin on the run for elimination.

==== Survival Balance ====
This mission was given to eliminated contestants in order to reverse their elimination. The participants were given 30 minutes by the Balancers to prepare a performance.

The chosen two Death contestants by the Balancers will be fully removed from the show.

Color key

Death

Survival Balance (episode 4–5)
Contestants
Kim Minseo (Note: Kim Minseo performed "No Sense" by Sam Kim.)
Bae Hyunjun (Note: Bae Hyunjun Performed "Chewing Gum" by NCT Dream.)
Won Bin (Note: Won Bin performed "Hot Sauce" by NCT Dream.)
Park Jaehoon (Note: Park Jaehoon performed a self-written song titled "개 (Me)".)
Yang Donghwa (Note: Yang Donghwa performed "Make Up" by Sam Kim.)
Jeong Seunghwan (Note: Jeong Seunghwan performed "Fate" by Lee Sun-hee.)

=== Final Balance ===
==== Battle Round ====
Teams were formed in Episode 5. Performances were shown on Episode 5. Results were revealed on Episode 7.

The winning team will receive 100 points for five members. Each Ace will receive a bonus of 100 points, giving the victorious team's Ace total of 200 points. The winning team's Death trainee will earn no points, while the losing team's Death trainee will incur a 100-point deduction, putting them at a disadvantage.

Color key

Winning team

Leader

Ace

Death

Battle Round (Episode 6)
Performance		Team	Votes (Note: Out of 204)	Contestants
Original artist(s)	Song	Team	Votes	Contestants
Got7	"Hard Carry"	Team A	71 (34.8%)	Choi Jinwook
Got7	"Hard Carry"	Team A	71 (34.8%)	Jeong Junho
Got7	"Hard Carry"	Team A	71 (34.8%)	Kim Minseo
Got7	"Hard Carry"	Team A	71 (34.8%)	Oh Junseok
Got7	"Hard Carry"	Team A	71 (34.8%)	Ryu Junmin
Infinite	"BTD (Before the Dawn)"	Team B	133 (65.2%)	Bae Hyunjun
Infinite	"BTD (Before the Dawn)"	Team B	133 (65.2%)	Jeong Seunghwan
Infinite	"BTD (Before the Dawn)"	Team B	133 (65.2%)	Kim Yeonkyu
Infinite	"BTD (Before the Dawn)"	Team B	133 (65.2%)	Seo Rakwon
Infinite	"BTD (Before the Dawn)"	Team B	133 (65.2%)	Yang Donghwa

==== Origin Round ====
In this round, the live audiences voted for each trainee individually. They can vote for multiple trainees, but they cannot vote for the same trainee multiple times. Each Balancer selects which trainees receive the Ace card, which is worth 50 points, and the Death card, which deducts 50 points.

Origin Round (Episode 8)
Performance	Points (Note: Only the top five trainees' points were revealed.)		Contestants
Performance	Votes	Ace cards	Contestants
"Run"	1170	0	Bae Hyunjun
"Run"	—	—	Choi Jinwook
"Run"	—	—	Jeong Junho
"Run"	1590	3	Jeong Seunghwan
"Run"	—	—	Kim Minseo
"Run"	—	—	Kim Yeonkyu
"Run"	1410	4	Oh Junseok
"Run"	1380	0	Ryu Junmin
"Run"	1320	2	Seo Rakwon
"Run"	—	—	Yang Donghwa

- points were not shown for the eliminated and final two members (Yang Donghwa and Kim Yeonkyu).

== Episodes ==
=== Episode 1 (March 19, 2022) ===
The show opened up with a performance of "Run", which is the signal song by all 13 contestants. The judges, known as balancers, were then introduced. The concept of the show was then explained by the MC Park Seon-young. It was also revealed that one member of the losing team will be eliminated.

For the first round, called the PR balance round, Team A performed "Mic Drop" by BTS while Team B performed "Hala Hala" by Ateez. Following each team's performance, the balancers voted for the best (Ace) and worst contestant (Death) of each team. The on-site audience then also voted for the best team performance with Team B winning the on-site voting. However, the final result will be decided through a combined points system.

=== Episode 7 (April 30, 2022) ===
Team B wins the first round of the final balance game and the members receive 100 points, except Jeong Seung-hwan, who gets the Death card and receives no points, and Yang Dong-hwa, who is chosen as the Ace and thus receives 200 points. In Team A, Oh Jun-seok receives 100 points as the Ace of his group, while Jun-ho receives minus 100 points as the Balancers deems him the most unconvincing. Then, the trainees are given a day off and are taken to a vacation house in the mountains, where they play games and enjoy a barbecue party. In the evening, they are joined by Jay Park, who gives them words of advice over dinner; the trainees conclude the night watching video messages they have previously recorded for each other.

== Ranking ==
The first five members were chosen from the final stage points, Ace and Death card points, and Balancers' assessment. The last two members were chosen by the Balancers.

Episode 8
#	Name	Points
1	Jeong Seung-hwan	1,740
2	Oh Jun-seok	1,710
3	Seok Rak-won	1,520
4	Ryu Jun-min	1,380
5	Bae Hyun-jun	1,270
6	Yang Dong-hwa	points were not shown
7	Kim Yeon-kyu	points were not shown

== Discography ==
=== Singles ===
Title	Year	Album
"Run"	2022	Non-album single

== Ratings ==
In the table below, the blue numbers represent the lowest ratings and the red numbers represent the highest ratings.

Average TV viewership ratings
Ep.	Original broadcast date	Average audience share
Ep.	Original broadcast date	Nielsen Korea (Nationwide)
1	March 19, 2022	0.293% (63rd)
2	March 26, 2022	0.249% (68th)
3	April 2, 2022	0.211% (71st)
4	April 9, 2022	0.396% (55th)
5	April 16, 2022	0.396% (58th)
6	April 23, 2022	0.191% (77th)
7	April 30, 2022	0.095% (84th)
8	May 7, 2022	0.145% (68th)

== Aftermath ==
- On June 13, 2022, IST Entertainment announced that Yang Donghwa would not be debuting as a member of ATBO after his past misconduct, when he was a student surfaced online.
- On June 17, 2022, IST Entertainment announced that Won Bin who is originally eliminated in ep 5, would be debuting with ATBO in replacement of Donghwa.
- ATBO made their official debut on July 27.
- On May 6, 2024, IST Entertainment announced Seok Rakwon's departure from the Group for health reasons.
Other contestants
- Some trainees joined new agencies:
  - Kang Dae-hyun joined Urban Works Media before transferring to DSP Media and subsequently to RBW, expecting to debut in RBW's new boy group in October 2023..
  - Jeong Jun-ho joined NOMAD Entertainment.
  - Yang Dong-hwa joined Bluedot Entertainment.
- Some trainees opened social media accounts:
  - Choi Jin-wook opened a personal Instagram account & Tiktok.
  - Kang Dae-hyun opened a personal Instagram account.
- Some trainees participated in other survival shows:
  - Kang Dae-hyun to participate in MBC's "Fantasy Boys".
  - Kim Min-seo participate in Mnet's "Build Up : Vocal Boy Group Survivor".
  - Yang Dong-hwa competed on the South Korean-Chinese survival show Starlight Boys. He ranked 8th on the show making the lineup for the group POLARIX.
- Some trainees will debut or debuted in new boy groups or released music as solo artists:
  - Kang Dae-hyun will debut in RBW's new boy group in October 2023.
  - Jeong Jun-ho debuted as a member of boy group NOMAD on February 28, 2024 under NOMAD Entertainment.
  - Yang Dong-hwa debuted as a soloist on February 18, 2024 under Bluedot Entertainment.
    - He debuted as a member POLARIX on May 28, 2025.
  - Kim Min-seo debuted as a member of boy Project group B.D.U on June 26, 2024".
    - B.D.U officially disbanded on March 23, 2026.
  - Park Jae-hoon returned to IST Entertainment and debuted as a member of the Kpop boy group TUNEXX on March 3, 2026.
