= HMS Gipsy =

HMS Gipsy (or Gipsey) has been the name of several Royal Navy ships:

- HMS Gipsy (1799), a schooner in service from 1799 to 1804 that captured several French privateers.
- HMS Gipsy (1804), a schooner purchased in Jamaica in 1804 and sold in 1808.
- HMS Gipsy (1836), a schooner tender launched in 1836 and sold in 1892.
- HMS Gipsy (1897), a C-class destroyer launched in 1897 and sold in 1921. The hull was used as a pontoon until at least 1937.
- HMS Gipsy (H63), a G-class destroyer launched in 1935 and mined on 21 November 1939 off Harwich.
- Gypsy, the former Gravesend ferry Carlotta, requisitioned as a depot ship for the auxiliary patrol service. Bombed at Tower Pier, London in 1941
