= Itinerant =

An itinerant is a person who travels habitually. Itinerant may refer to:

- "Travellers" or itinerant groups in Europe
- Itinerant preacher, also known as itinerant minister
- Travelling salespeople, see door-to-door, hawker, and peddler
- Travelling showpeople, see Carny (US), Showmen (UK)
- The Peredvizhniki or Itinerants, a school of nineteenth-century Russian painters
- Vagrancy (people)
- People experiencing long-term homelessness
- Mendicant
- Eyre (legal term) or "itinerant justice"
  - Justice in Eyre
- "Itinerant court" of Charlemagne (and later Carolingian emperors), see Government of the Carolingian Empire
- Migrant worker

== See also ==
- Nomadism (habitual travelling for pasture)
- Transhumance
- Gypsy (term)
- Gypsy (disambiguation)
