= Call Me Back (single album) =

- Digital cover

Single album by NOMAD
- Released: October 9, 2024
- Length: 6:07
- Language: Korean, English
- Label: Nomad Entertainment; Kakao Entertainment

NOMAD chronology
Nomad (2024)	Call Me Back (2024)

Singles from Call Me Back
- 1. "Call Me Back" Released: October 9, 2024

Call Me Back is the only single album by the South Korean boy band NOMAD, featuring two songs, the only single and title track of the same name and "Compare". It was released by Nomad and Kakao Entertainment on October 9, 2024. Physically, the single album is available in CD and tape. Call Me Back peaked at number thirteen on South Korea's national Circle Album Chart, shifting over 21,000 units domestically since its release. It represents NOMAD's second and final release of original material before their breakup in 2026.

== Background ==
On September 11, 2024, Nomad Entertainment announced that NOMAD would be releasing their first single album in October 2024. On September 20, the group announced Call Me Back as the title of their first and only single album to be released on October 9.

== Commercial performance ==
On the chart dated October 6–12, 2024, Call Me Back debuted at #13 on South Korea's national Circle Album Chart. The single album also debuted at #64 on the monthly chart and shifted 9,585 units domestically by the end of the month.

== Track listing ==
Call Me Back track listing
No.	Title	Length
1.	"Call Me Back"	2:59
2.	"Compare"	3:08
Total length:		6:07

== Charts ==
Chart performance for Call Me Back
Chart (2024)	Peak position
South Korean Albums (Circle)	13
