= Gypsy (SP-55) =

Patrol vessel of the United States Navy

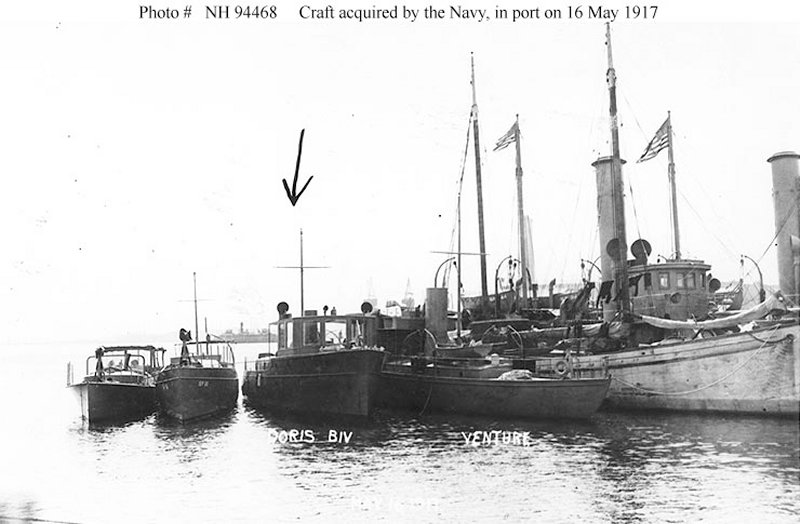
- Among boats photographed on 16 May 1917 after their acquisition by the U.S. Navy is Gypsy, second from left. The boat on the far left is unidentified. The rest, left to right, are USS Doris B. IV (SP-625), USS Venture (SP-616), and USS Comber (SP 344).

History

United States
- Name: Gypsy (planned)
- Namesake: Previous name retained
- Builder: George Lawley and Sons, Neponset, Massachusetts
- Completed: 1912
- Acquired: 11 May 1917
- Commissioned: Never
- Stricken: 23 November 1917
- Fate: Burned while fitting out 20 June 1917
- Notes: Operated as private motorboat Gypsy 1912-1917

General characteristics
- Type: Patrol vessel (planned)
- Displacement: 22 tons
- Length: 61 ft (19 m)
- Beam: 10 ft 3 in (3.12 m)
- Draft: 3 ft 6 in (1.07 m)
- Speed: 11 knots

Gypsy (SP-55) was the planned designation for a motorboat the United States Navy acquired in 1917 for use as a patrol vessel but which was destroyed by a fire before she could be commissioned.

Gypsy was built in 1912 by George Lawley and Sons at Neponset, Massachusetts as a private motorboat. The U.S. Navy purchased Gypsy on 11 May 1917 for World War I service for $9,000 from Robert F. Herrick of Boston, who also owned Apache that was also purchased by the Navy on 23 May 1917 just before completion. The craft was intended to use her as a patrol boat in the Section Patrol. However, before she could be commissioned, she was completely destroyed by an accidental fire while fitting out, on 20 June 1917 off coast of the U.S. Coast Guard Station Allerton Point, south east of Boston, Massachusetts.

Gypsy was stricken from the Navy List on 23 November 1919.

- List of patrol vessels of the United States Navy
