= Gipsy, Pennsylvania =

Unincorporated community in Pennsylvania, U.S.

Coordinates: 40°48′26″N 78°52′35″W

Gipsy is an unincorporated community in Indiana County, in the U.S. state of Pennsylvania.

== History ==
Gipsy was founded after 1885 in a coal mining district. A post office called Gipsy has been in operation since 1891.
