= Ty5 retrotransposon =

The Ty5 is a type of retrotransposon native to the Saccharomyces cerevisiae organism.

== The Saccharomyces cerevisiae retrotransposon Ty5 ==
Ty5 is one of five endogenous retrotransposons native to the model organism Saccharomyces cerevisiae, all of which target integration to gene poor regions. Endogenous retrotransposons are hypothesized to target gene poor chromosomal targets in order to reduce the chance of inactivating host genes. Ty1-Ty4 integrate upstream of Pol III promoters, while Ty5 targets integration to loci bound in heterochromatin. In the case of Ty5, this likely occurs by means of an interaction between the C-terminus of integrase and a target protein. The tight targeting patterns seen for the Ty elements are thought to be a means to limit damage to its host, which has a very gene dense genome. Ty5 was discovered in the mid-1990s in the laboratory of Daniel Voytas at Iowa State University. Ty5 is used as a model system by which to understand the biology of the telomere and heterochromatin. The Ty5 retrotransposon is used as a genetic model to study the architecture and dynamics of the telomeres and heterochromatin.

=== Yeast heterochromatin and Ty5. ===
Heterochromatin in S. cerevisiae is composed of a wide array of proteins and plays several roles. The first stage of heterochromatin formation requires DNA binding proteins, which interact with specific cis DNA sequences at the telomeres, rDNA and HM loci. These proteins, including Rap1p and the origin recognition complex (ORC), serve as a platform for other proteins to bind, condense the DNA, and modify neighboring histones. Some of these proteins, notably Rap1p, also play other roles, including initiation of transcription. The first known step in the formation of dedicated heterochromatin is the binding of Sir4p to Rap1p (Luo, Vega-Palas et al. 2002). Sir4p is one of four ‘Silent Information Regulator’ proteins that also include Sir1p, Sir2p and Sir3p. Of these, Sir2p, Sir3p and Sir4p form the core of heterochromatin. Sir4p serves as a binding site for Sir2p, which is the next to bind. Sir2p deacetylates adjacent histones, which is thought to further condense the chromatin and prevent the binding of other transcription promoting histone modification enzymes. Sir3p binding follows, further condensing the heterochromatin. Sir1p plays a role in the initiation of silencing at the HM loci. A large number of other proteins act in both a synergistic and antagonistic manner.

Early work characterizing Ty5 targeted transposition focused on two fronts: identifying the component of Ty5 responsible for targeting and identifying the factor with which it interacted. Due to the central role of the Sir proteins in heterochromatin formation, they were initially considered as potential targeting signals. Because integration is mediated by the retrotransposon integrase enzyme, it was speculated to contain a component that would recognize heterochromatin. The C-terminus of the Ty retrotransposon's integrase contains an extension not seen in the retroviruses. This region is also not conserved between Ty1 and Ty5, whereas the rest of the integrase is, suggesting that this divergence could be responsible for the different targeting of the yeast Ty elements. A mutation was identified in the integrase C-terminus that randomized Ty5 integration, suggesting that this region of integrase was in fact involved in targeted transposition.

=== Implications for human health and disease ===
Ty5 is a relative of the Retroviridae family of retroviruses, which includes the human pathogen HIV. Ty5 is a tractable system in which to study the biology of retrovirus integration.
