= Gypsy music =

Gypsy music may refer to:

- Romani music, the music of the Romani people
- Gypsy jazz, a fusion of Romani music and jazz
- Gypsy punk, a fusion of Romani music and punk rock
- Gypsy scale, a musical scale associated with Romani music
- Gypsy style, a music genre associated with Romani music
