= USS Comber (SP-344) =

Minesweeper of the United States Navy

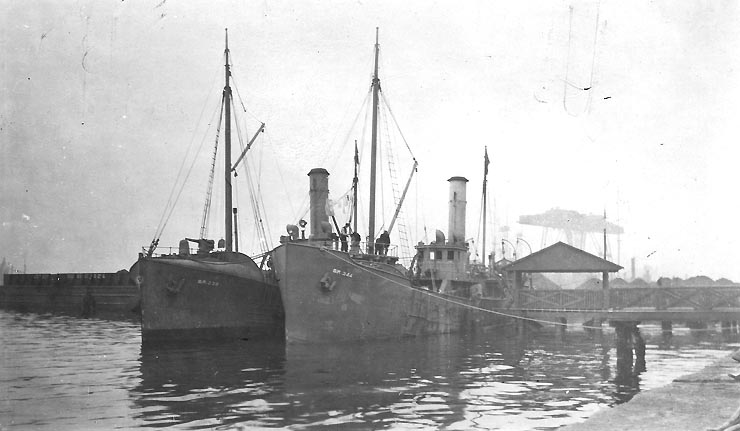
- USS Comber (right) moored to port of minesweeper USS Crest (SP-339) (left).

History

United States
- Name: USS Comber
- Namesake: Previous name retained
- Builder: Manitowoc Shipbuilding Company, Manitowoc, Wisconsin
- Completed: 1916
- Acquired: 1917
- Commissioned: 19 April 1917
- Fate: Returned to owners 2 April 1919
- Notes: Operated as commercial fishing trawler Comber 1916-1917 and from 1919

General characteristics
- Type: Minesweeper
- Tonnage: 303 Gross register tons
- Length: 143 ft (44 m)
- Beam: 22 ft 6 in (6.86 m)
- Draft: 13 ft 5 in (4.09 m)
- Installed power: 600 indicated horsepower (0.45 megawatt)
- Propulsion: Steam engine, one shaft
- Speed: 11 knots
- Complement: 27
- Armament: 1 × 6-pounder gun; 1 × 3-pounder gun

The first USS Comber (SP-344) was a United States Navy minesweeper in commission from 1917 to 1919.

== U.S. Navy career ==
Comber was built in 1916 as a commercial fishing trawler of the same name by Manitowoc Shipbuilding Company at Manitowoc, Wisconsin. The U.S. Navy chartered Comber in 1917 for World War I service and commissioned her as USS Comber (SP-344) on 19 April 1917.

Fitted out as a minesweeper, Comber carried out minesweeping operations along the coast of New England in the 1st Naval District and 2nd Naval District, carried supplies, and patrolled in the Newport, Rhode Island, area. During the spring and summer of 1918, Comber made two voyages to Bermuda, convoying submarine chasers. After a brief tour of minesweeping in the 4th Naval District off Pennsylvania, southern New Jersey, and Delaware, Comber moved to Boston, Massachusetts to resume minesweeping operations off New England.

The Navy returned Comber to her owners on 2 April 1919.
