= Gypsy moth (disambiguation) =

The term gypsy moth originally means the moth Lymantria dispar. It may also refer to:

Gypsy Moth:

- Skein (character), a Marvel Comics character formerly known as Gypsy Moth

Gipsy Moth:

- The de Havilland DH.60 Moth, a light aircraft from 1925
- Gipsy Moth IV, a yacht sailed round the world by Sir Francis Chichester
  - Gipsy Moth II, and III, this yacht's predecessors (Gipsy Moth I was an aeroplane.)

== See also ==
- The Gypsy Moths, a 1969 American drama film
