= Integron =

Feature of bacterial genomes

Integrons are genetic mechanisms that allow bacteria to adapt and evolve rapidly through the stockpiling and expression of new genes. These genes are embedded in a specific genetic structure called gene cassette (a term that is lately changing to integron cassette) that generally carries one promoterless open reading frame (ORF) together with a recombination site (attC). Integron cassettes are incorporated to the attI site of the integron platform by site-specific recombination reactions mediated by the integrase.

== Discovery ==
Integrons were initially discovered on conjugative plasmids through their role in antibiotic resistance. Indeed, these mobile integrons, as they are now known, can carry a variety of cassettes containing genes that are almost exclusively related to antibiotic resistance. Further studies have come to the conclusion that integrons are chromosomal elements, and that their mobilisation onto plasmids has been fostered by transposons and selected by the intensive use of antibiotics. The function of the majority of cassettes found in chromosomal integrons remains unknown.

== Integron function ==
Cassette maintenance requires that they be integrated within a replicative element (chromosome, plasmids). The integrase encoded by the integron preferentially catalyses two types of recombination reaction: 1) attC x attC, which results in cassette excision, 2) attI x attC, which allows integration of the cassette at the attI site of the integron. Once inserted, the cassette is maintained during cell division. Successive integrations of gene cassettes result in the formation of a series of cassettes. The cassette integrated last is then the one closest to the Pc promoter at the attI site. The IntI-catalysed mode of recombination involves structured single-stranded DNA and gives the attC site recognition mode unique characteristics. The integration of gene cassettes within an integron also provides a Pc promoter that allows expression of all cassettes in the array, much like an operon. The level of gene expression of a cassette is then a function of the number and nature of the cassettes that precede it. In 2009, Didier Mazel and his team showed that the expression of the IntI integrase was controlled by the bacterial SOS response, thus coupling this adaptive apparatus to the stress response in bacteria. In 2025 two groups found that many cassettes encode bacterial anti-phage proteins—these are carried both on mobile integrons and sedentary chromosomal integrons.

== Structure ==
Illustration of integron components and a mobile genetic element, showing the potential location of its insertion into the cassette (in Polish)

An integron is minimally composed of:

- a gene encoding for a site-specific recombinase: intI, belonging to the integrase family
- a proximal recombination site: attI, which is recognized by the integrase and at which gene cassettes may be inserted
- a promoter: Pc, which directs transcription of cassette-encoded genes

=== Gene cassettes ===
Additionally, an integron will usually contain one or more gene cassettes that have been incorporated into it. The gene cassettes may encode genes for antibiotic resistance, although most genes in integrons are uncharacterized. An attC sequence (also called 59-be) is a repeat that flanks cassettes and enables cassettes to be integrated at the attI site, excised and undergo horizontal gene transfer.

== Occurrence ==
Integrons may be found as part of mobile genetic elements such as plasmids and transposons. Integrons can also be found in chromosomes.

== Terminology ==
The term super-integron was first applied in 1998 (but without definition) to the integron with a long cassette array on the small chromosome of Vibrio cholerae. The term has since been used for integrons of various cassette array lengths or for integrons on bacterial chromosomes (versus, for example, plasmids). Use of "super-integron" is now discouraged since its meaning is unclear.

In more modern usage, an integron located on a bacterial chromosome is termed a sedentary chromosomal integron, and one associated with transposons or plasmids is called a mobile integron.
