= Gipsy-1 =

Cave in Tatarstan, Russia

Coordinates: 55°14′01″N 49°13′59″E

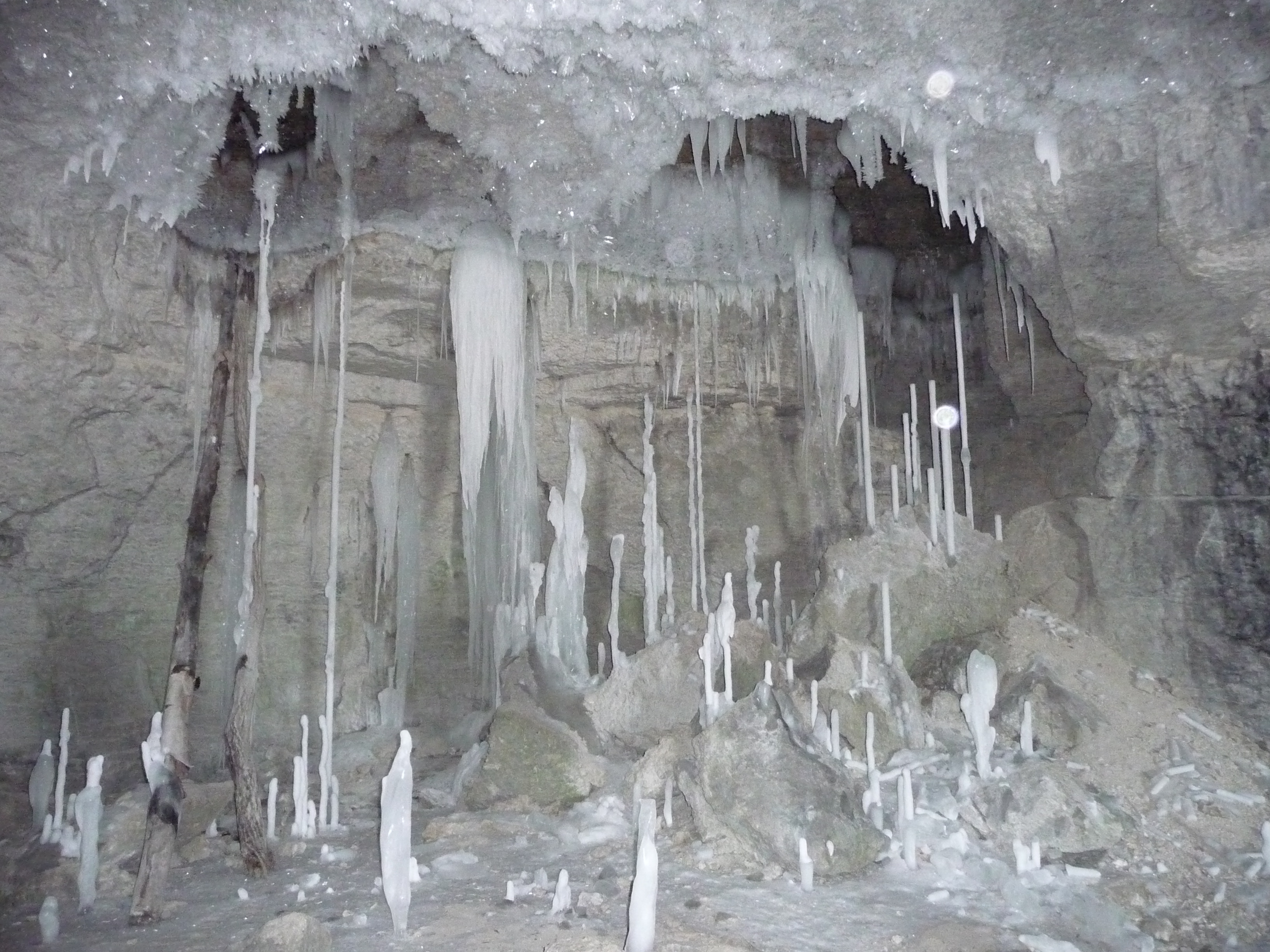
Гипсы-1 ледяные сталогмиты.jpg

The Gipsy-1 (Russian: Гипсы-1, IPA: [ˈɡʲipsɨ ɐˈdʲin]) is a system of 2680 m long interconnected adits in Kamsko-Ustyinsky District, Tatarstan, Russia, where gypsum was mined in 1930-1950s. It is the only mine in the area that can be visited by outdoor tourists, since other similar mines have been buried or flooded.
