= Nomad (EP) =

- Digital cover

EP by NOMAD
- Released: February 28, 2024
- Genres: K-pop; R&B; hip hop
- Length: 23:48
- Languages: Korean, English
- Labels: Nomad Entertainment; Kakao Entertainment

NOMAD chronology
Nomad (2024)	Call Me Back (2024)

Singles from Nomad
- 1. "No Pressure" Released: February 28, 2024; 2. "California Love" Released: March 13, 2024

Nomad is the only extended play (EP) by South Korean boy band NOMAD. The EP was released on February 28, 2024, by Nomad and Kakao Entertainment. It contains seven tracks with "No Pressure" and "California Love" as its double lead singles and title tracks. Nomad represents the group's first release of original material.

== Background and promotion ==
On December 20, 2023, Nomad Entertainment released the profile mood video of the five members on their official YouTube channel who would debut after two years of preparation. On December 27, Nomad announced that they would be pre-releasing some of the group's songs ahead of their official debut. The next day, the performance video of NOMAD's first pre-release track "Lights On" was released.

On January 12, 2024, NOMAD released the lyric video of their second pre-released track "Eye 2 Eye". On January 24, the group released another lyric video for their third pre-released track "Automatic".

On February 2, 2024, Nomad announced the debut date of NOMAD to be on February 28, by releasing the group's scheduler and the title of eponymous EP, Nomad and its double lead single "No Pressure" and "California Love". They would also release another two tracks "Oasis" and "Let Me Love You" on February 9 and 23, respectively. On February 28, Nomad held both a media showcase in the morning and a fan showcase in the evening at Seongam Art Hall in Gangnam District, Seoul to commemorate the release of their debut EP. On the same day, NOMAD officially debuted and released the music video of "No Pressure". While the music video of "California Love" was released on March 13.

== Commercial performance ==
On the chart dated February 25–March 2, 2024, Nomad debuted at #45 on South Korea's national Circle Album Chart.

== Track listing ==
Nomad track listing
No.	Title	Length
1.	"No Pressure"	3:01
2.	"California Love"	3:40
3.	"Oasis"	3:05
4.	"Automatic"	3:19
5.	"Let Me Love You"	3:45
6.	"Lights On"	3:20
7.	"Eye 2 Eye"	3:38
Total length:		23:48

== Charts ==
Chart performance for Nomad
Chart (2024)	Peak position
South Korean Albums (Circle)	45
