= Gypsy (1962 film soundtrack) =

Gypsy – Original Sound Track

Soundtrack album
- Released: 1962
- Label: Warner Bros.

The original soundtrack to the 1962 motion picture Gypsy was released by Warner Bros. Records in the same year.

== Critical reception ==
Professional ratings
Review scores
| Source | Rating |
|---|---|
| AllMusic | 2.5/5 stars |
| Billboard | (positive) |

In his retrospective review for AllMusic, William Ruhlmann rated the soundtrack to Gypsy 2.5 stars out of five concluding that it "was a weak album."

Back in 1962, Billboard picked the album for its "Spotlight" section, writing: "Gypsy wasn't the best of Broadway musicals, but it had bounce and spirit, and was no strain. This sound-track album, with Rosalind Russell, Natalie Wood and Karl Malden in key roles, re-creates the spirit of vaudeville and burlesque [...] and should prove a major seller. Orchestrations are big and lavish, and so is the stereo sound." The Billboard reviewer also especially noted the "sparkling" performance of Natalie Wood, who, according to William Ruhlmann, was in fact vocally dubbed by Marni Nixon. According to Ruhlmann, Rosalind Russell, too, was "extensive[ly] dubb[ed]" – by Lisa Kirk: "Russell pre-recorded her songs, [... but] didn't get to sing most of them on-screen", as she was "unable to fill her shoes vocally".

== Chart performance ==
The album peaked at number 23 on the mono and number 13 on the stereo half of Billboard's Top LPs chart in early 1963.

== Track listing ==
LP – Warner Bros. – B 1480 (mono), BS 1480 (stereo)

All lyrics are written by Jule Styne; all music is composed by Stephen Sondheim.

Side 1
| No. | Title | Length |
|---|---|---|
| 1. | "Overture" | 3:59 |
| 2. | "Small World" | 1:59 |
| 3. | "Some People" | 3:29 |
| 4. | "Baby June and Her Newsboys" | 1:43 |
| 5. | "Mr. Goldstone" | 2:22 |
| 6. | "Little Lamb" | 2:21 |
| 7. | "You'll Never Get Away from Me" | 2:39 |
| 8. | "Dainty June and Her Farmboys" | 1:38 |
| 9. | "If Mama Was Married" | 2:53 |

Side 2
| No. | Title | Length |
|---|---|---|
| 1. | "All I Need Is the Girl" | 4:52 |
| 2. | "Everything's Coming Up Roses" | 3:11 |
| 3. | "Together Wherever We Go" | 1:16 |
| 4. | "You Gotta Have a Gimmick" | 4:26 |
| 5. | "Let Me Entertain You" | 4:07 |
| 6. | "Rose's Turn" | 4:13 |
| 7. | "Finale" | 0:44 |

== Charts ==
| Chart (1963) | Peak position |
|---|---|
| US Billboard Top LPs – 150 Best Selling Monaural LPs | 23 |
| US Billboard Top LPs – 50 Best Selling Stereo LPs | 13 |
