= The Nomads (1976 film) =

- مسيرة الرعاة
- Directed by: Sid Ali Mazif
- Written by: Sid Ali Mazif
- Screenplay by: Sid Ali Mazif
- Produced by: ONCIC
- Starring: Mohamed Chouikh, Hassan El-Hassani, Hafsa Zinaï Koudil, Abdelkader Messaoudi
- Release date: 1976
- Running time: 100 minutes
- Country: Algeria
- Languages: Arabic local dialects

The Nomads (in Arabic: مسيرة الرعاة) is an Algerian film directed by Sid Ali Mazif in 1976. The film was presented to the Quinzaine des Réalisateurs (Cannes Film Festival). The film deals with the socio-political situation in rural areas of post-independence Algeria.

== Synopsis ==
After their father's death, three brothers from a pastoral community take divergent paths: one settles in the city, another continues traditional livestock farming, and the third joins a modern agricultural cooperative. The film portrays the clash between tradition and modernity, the transformations brought about by the agrarian revolution, and the gradual impoverishment of nomadic populations.

== Technical details ==
- Director: Sid Ali Mazif
- Screenplay: Sid Ali Mazif
- Production: ONCIC
- Runtime: 100 minutes (1h40)
- Country: Algeria
- Language: Arabic / local dialects

== Cast ==
- Mohamed Chouikh
- Hassan El-Hassani

== Production and genesis ==
In this work, Sid Ali Mazif offers a reflection on the sedentarization policy and the agrarian revolution in Algeria. The film contrasts traditional pastoral life with nationalization and the evolution of agricultural tools, while also examining the processes of impoverishment among nomads. The film was selected for the Quinzaine des Réalisateurs in 1976.

== Themes and interpretations ==
The film is described as a socially engaged film, using fiction to document the socio-economic conditions of nomadic life by examining the effects of modernization: sedentarization, loss of resources, land concentration, and the transformation of community solidarity. A study exists that cites it as a key reference for cinematographic research on the socio-political events of the 1970s.

== Reception and festivals ==
- Directors' Fortnight (Cannes) — 1976 screening (film presented in the parallel selection)

== See also ==
=== Related articles ===
- List of Algerian films

=== Bibliography ===
- "Dictionary of African Filmmakers — Roy Armes". Scribd (excerpt).
- "Film in the Middle East and North Africa — Creative Dissidence". Dokumen.pub.
