= NOMAD (group) =

South Korean boy group (2024–2026)

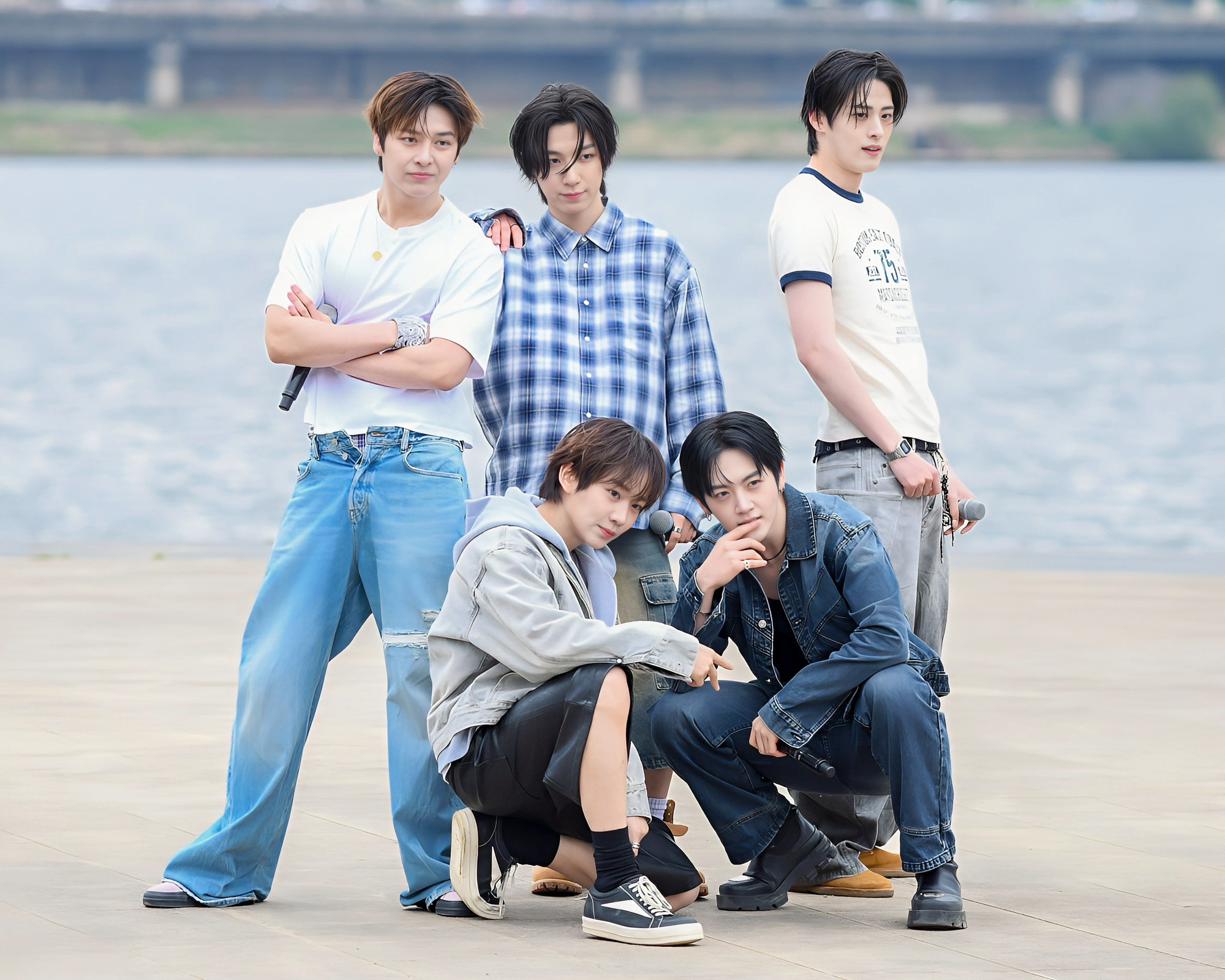
- NOMAD in 2025

Background information
- Also known as: Need Our Microphone And Dances
- Origin: Seoul, South Korea
- Genres: K-pop; R&B; hip hop
- Years active: 2024–2026
- Label: Nomad
- Past members: Sangha; Doy; One; Rivr; Junho
- Website: nomadofficial.kr

NOMAD (Korean: 노매드; RR: Nomaedeu; backronym for Need Our Microphone And Dances) was a South Korean boy band formed by Nomad Entertainment. The group consists of five members: Sangha, Doy, One, Rivr, and Junho. They debuted on February 28, 2024, with the eponymous extended play (EP) Nomad, and disbanded on January 12, 2026, citing internal management conditions.

== Name ==
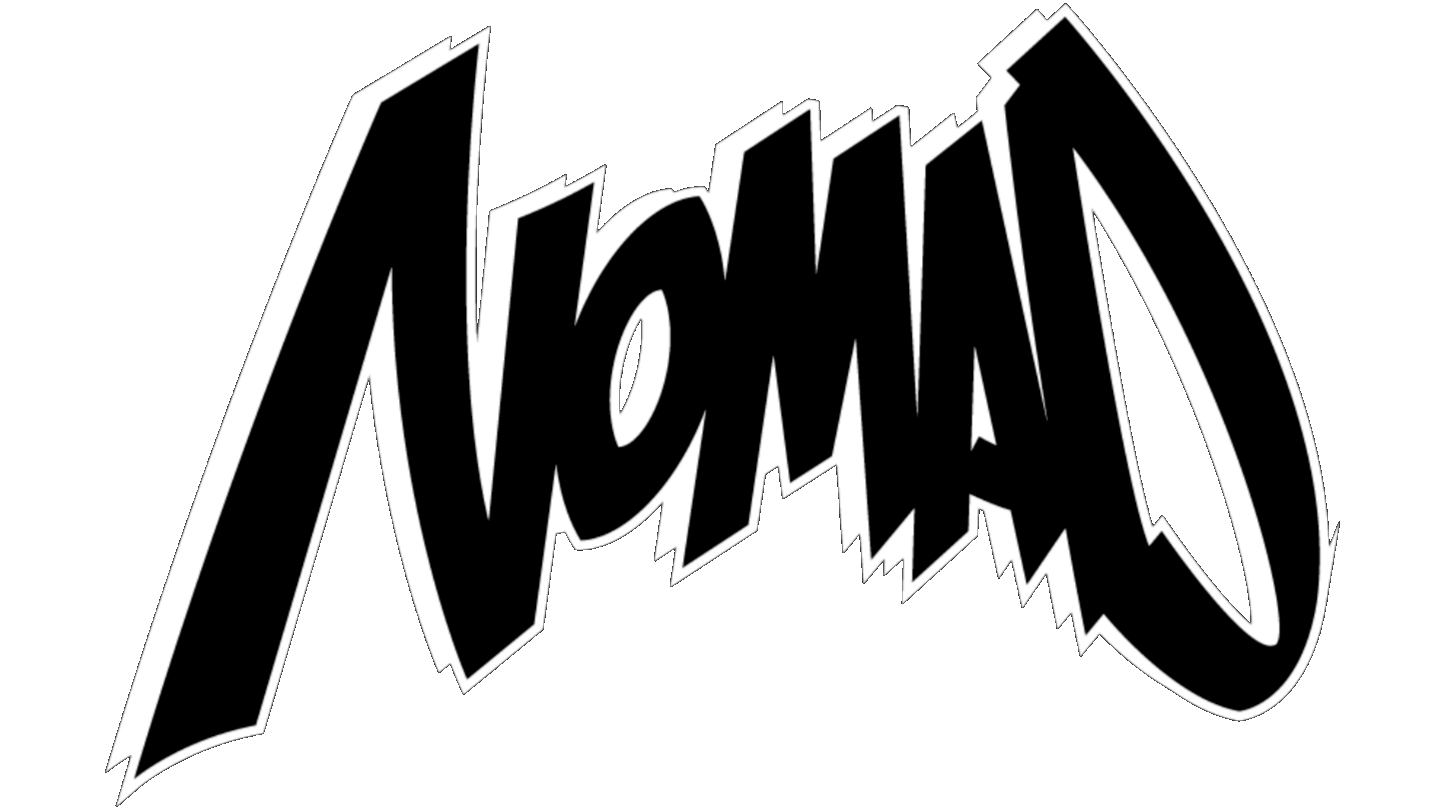
NOMAD logo

NOMAD is a backronym for "Need Our Microphone And Dances", and reflects their confidence in saying, "Bring a microphone to really dance and enjoy the stage". However, members were more attached to the standard dictionary definition of nomad.

== History ==
=== 2021–2022: Pre-debut activities ===
Sangha and Junho were both contestants from MBC's survival show, Wild Idol and IST Entertainment survival show, The Origin – A, B, Or What?, respectively.

=== 2023–2026: Introduction, debut and disbandment ===
On December 20, 2023, Nomad Entertainment released the profile mood video of the five members (Note: In order of the released of NOMAD's profile mood video: Sangha, Doy, One, Rivr, and Junho.) on their official YouTube channel who would debut after two years of preparation. On December 27, Nomad announced that they would be pre-releasing some of the group's songs ahead of their official debut. The next day, the performance video of NOMAD's first pre-release track "Lights On" was released.

On January 12, 2024, NOMAD released the lyric video of their second pre-released track "Eye 2 Eye". On January 24, the group released another lyric video for their third pre-released track "Automatic".

On February 2, 2024, Nomad announced the debut date of NOMAD to be on February 28, by releasing the group's scheduler and the title of eponymous EP, Nomad and its double lead single "No Pressure" and "California Love". They would also release another two tracks "Oasis" and "Let Me Love You" on February 9 and 23, respectively. On February 28, Nomad held both a media showcase in the morning and fan showcase in the evening at Seongam Art Hall in Gangnam District, Seoul to commemorate the release of their debut EP. On the same day, NOMAD officially debuted and released the music video of "No Pressure". While the music video of "California Love" was released on March 13.

On September 11, 2024, Nomad announced that NOMAD would be releasing their first single album in October 2024. On September 20, the group announced Call Me Back as the title of their first single album to be released on October 9.

On January 12, 2026, Nomad announced that NOMAD would be ceasing all group activities. The agency cited internal management conditions as the primary reason for the decision, which followed extensive discussions with the five members. While group activities have concluded, the agency stated that the members would transition into individual careers and requested continued support for their future endeavors.

== Influences ==
During an interview with MHN Sports, Nomad said that YG Entertainment's BigBang is the group's role model.

== Past members ==
- Sangha (상하)
- Doy (도의) – leader
- One (원)
- Rivr (리버)
- Junho (준호)

== Discography ==
=== Extended plays ===
List of extended plays, showing selected details, selected chart positions, and sales figures
Title	Details	Peak chart positions	Sales
Title	Details	KOR	Sales
Nomad	Released: February 28, 2024; Labels: Nomad, Kakao; Formats: CD, digital download, streaming	45	KOR: 7,384

=== Single albums ===
List of single albums, showing selected details, selected chart positions, and sales figures
Title	Details	Peak chart positions	Sales
Title	Details	KOR	Sales
Call Me Back	Released: October 9, 2024; Labels: Nomad, Kakao; Formats: CD, digital download, streaming	13	KOR: 21,282

=== Singles ===
List of singles, showing year released, and name of the album
Title	Year	Album
"No Pressure"	2024	Nomad
"California Love"	2024	Nomad
"Call Me Back"	2024	Call Me Back
"Carnival"	2025	Non-album single

== Awards and nominations ==
Name of the award ceremony, year presented, category, nominee of the award, and the result of the nomination
Award ceremony	Year	Category	Nominee / work	Result	Ref.
The Fact Music Awards	2024	Best Music – Spring	"No Pressure"	Nominated	
