= The Nomad (music producer) =

New Zealand music producer (born 1972)

Daimon Schwalger
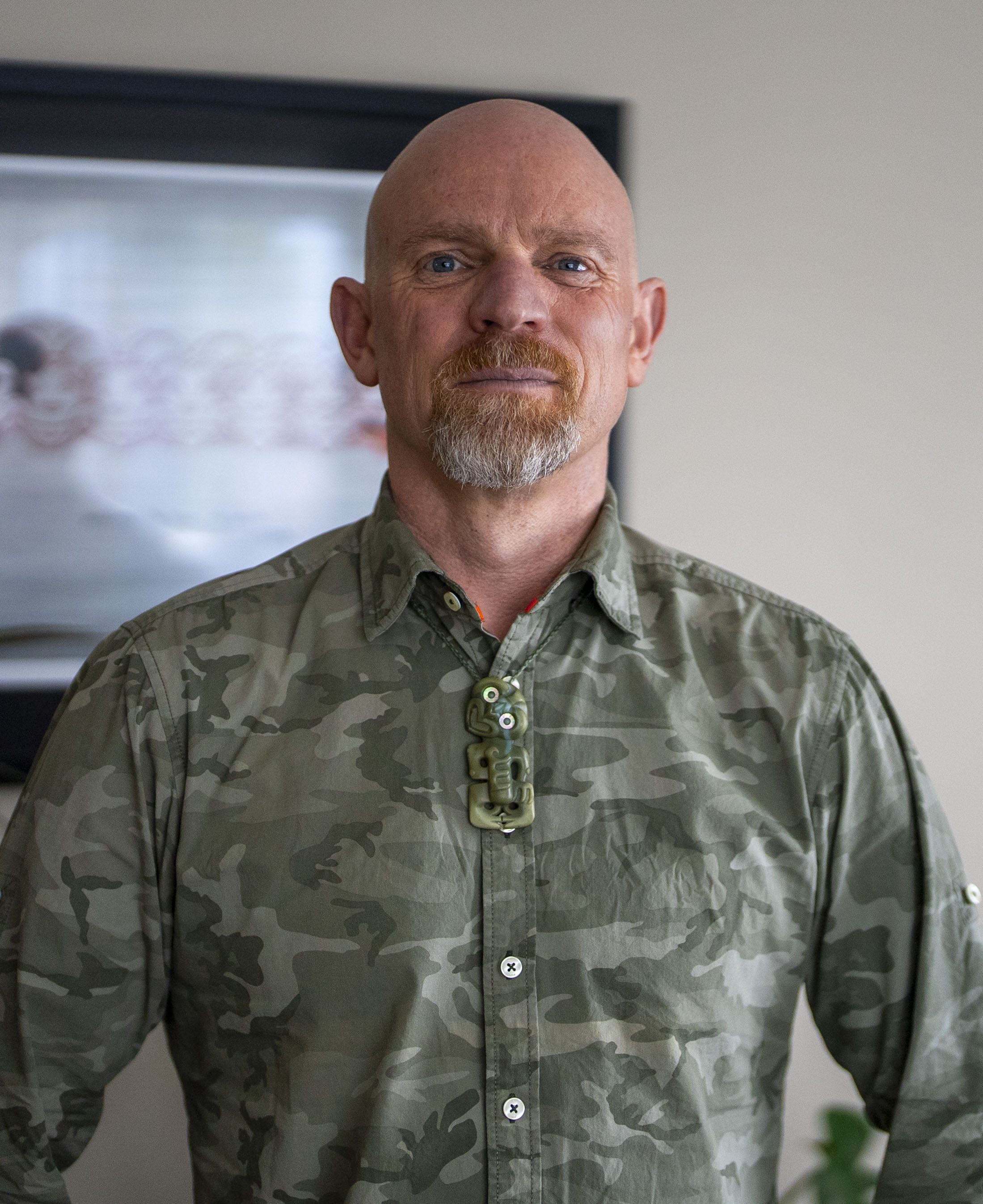
- The Nomad at home
- Born: Daimon Jon Schwalger; 17 July 1972 (age 53); Dunedin, New Zealand
- Occupations: Music producer, DJ
- Years active: 1989–present

Daimon Schwalger (born 17 July 1972), known professionally as The Nomad, is a New Zealand music producer, DJ and commercial videographer.

Since launching his production career in the 1990s, The Nomad has worked with many prominent international and New Zealand vocalists and musicians, including Barnaby Weir (The Black Seeds), MC Antsman (Rhombus), Tehimana Kerr (Fat Freddy’s Drop), Pearl Runga, Tiki Taane, King Kapisi, Mad Professor, Pepsi DeMacque (Wham!), Urban Soul Orchestra, and Farda P (Rockers Hi-Fi).

To date, Schwalger, under the stage name The Nomad, has released 11 albums, including seven original studio albums. His second album, Second Selection, was awarded Best Dub/Hip-hop/Reggae Release at the bNet NZ Music Awards in 2000.

== Personal life ==
Schwalger was born in Dunedin, New Zealand in 1972 to Alan Ryalls, who worked at ice cream manufacturer Tip Top, and Kieren Dickison, a stay at home mother. During infancy, his mother met and married Tony Schwalger, who adopted Daimon as his son. He has one sister and two brothers. Schwalger was educated at Kings High School in Dunedin, however he left school before completing the 5th form (year 11), after his parents disapproved of his love of music.

He moved to different locations around New Zealand throughout his childhood, including Taupō, Pukekohe, and Hamilton, and also to Western Samoa and Hawaii. During this time he discovered hip hop music through connections with New Zealand’s Pacific Island communities, composing his own rap lyrics whilst listening to songs from Run DMC and Beastie Boys using headphones while he attended church services.

As an adult, Schwalger has lived in Christchurch, Wellington, Melbourne (Australia), Wānaka and Westport. Initially calling himself DJ Damee D, Schwalger has said he adopted the name the Nomad because of his nomadic lifestyle throughout his early life, and that it was a palindrome of his first name.

Schwalger is married, and has one daughter (born 2005) from a previous relationship.

== Music career ==
Following a period of DJing (under the name DJ Damee D) at local Dunedin venues the Taipei Club and Club Nouveau, Schwalger moved to Christchurch in 1992 and began promoting events focused on hip hop, jungle and ragga music. In 1996 Schwalger formed the group Locuste with vocalist Pearl Runga (sister of fellow recording artists Bic Runga and Boh Runga) and keyboardist Ryan Smith, drawing the attention of Andrew Penman from Salmonella Dub, who included the track ‘Sounds Like These’ on his compilation of New Zealand electronica Off the Beat N Track Vol 2.

In 1998, Schwalger released his first solo album Movement, mixed by Tiki Taane who was then Salmonella Dub’s live mixing engineer. Vocalists include Pearl Runga and MC Antsman, who has remained a close collaborator and live performer with The Nomad.

The following year 2nd Selection was released to critical acclaim, with the album winning the Best Dub / Hip Hop / Reggae category at the 2000 bNet NZ Music Awards. Tiki Taane again mixed this album, which featured local vocalists MC Antsman, Charmed 1 and Lotus Hartley, and the first international collaboration with Farda P (Rockers Hi-Fi).

Schwalger moved to Wellington in 2000 where he released the Concentrated EP of the eponymous single and remixes of previously released tracks. In 2001 The Nomad released his third studio album Level 3, again mixed by Tiki Taane and featuring collaborations with MC Antsman, Barnaby Weir (The Black Seeds, Flash Harry, Fly My Pretties), Tehimana Kerr (Fat Freddys Drop), and Mark Tyler and Conan Wilcox from Salmonella Dub. Reviewing for The Dominion newspaper Lindsay Davis said the album was “Pacific drum’n’bass at its best”.

Released in 2003, the fourth studio album Step 4th was mixed by Schwalger himself for the first time, featuring international vocalists Pepsi DeMacque and Mad Professor, and New Zealand-based vocalists MC Antsman, Lotus Hartley, Tokyo Mae and Alda Rezende.

The 2005 album Quinessence was the last to be produced from Wellington, featuring Pepsi Damacque, Imon Star (Rhombus, Olmecha Supreme), Rio Hemopo (Trinity Roots, Scribes of Ra), guitarist Oakley Grenell (son of New Zealand country music star John Grenell), Vanessa Stacey and Ras Stone.

After moving to Melbourne Australia in 2009, Schwalger released a Best-Of compilation Selected Works, which included five new compositions alongside re-worked songs. UK ambient music group Subtropic were among those providing a remix for the album, which featured vocalists Rockers Hi-Fi's Farda P, Luciano, The Mad Professor, King Kapisi, Lisa Tomlins (Rhombus), Antsman, Barnaby Weir and Oakley Grenell.

The sixth studio album Perilous Times (the first studio album not to use a numerical title) was also released in 2009 from Melbourne. Artists featured on Perilous Times include the United Kingdom’s Urban Soul Orchestra, Caroline Augustini and Boover Banton, Australians Jake Savona, Saritah and Vida Sunshyne, Jornick (French Guiana) and New Zealanders Julia Deans (Fur Patrol) and Rayjah45.

After a time living in Wanaka 2011–13, Schwalger briefly moved to Westport, on the West Coast of New Zealand’s South Island, where he recorded his seventh studio album 7, featuring New Zealand hip hop star King Kapisi among others. Returning to Wellington, Schwalger began his relationship with his now-wife Prue, and developed his commercial videography career, before moving back to Westport permanently in 2016. Schwalger’s recording and touring career was largely paused between 2016 and 2023 while he focused on his videography work.

Schwalger released his retrospective 25-year anniversary series, Infinite, which includes limited edition vinyl-only releases across three editions in 2023 and 2024. The first edition released September 2023 reached #1 on the NZ Independent Music Charts and #2 in the Official New Zealand Music Chart.

An eighth original studio album is scheduled for release in 2025. The first single "Momentum", featuring Christchurch vocalist Michèle Ducray, was released in September 2024.

== Live performance ==
Since beginning as a nightclub DJ in 1989 in Dunedin The Nomad has been performing live since 1996, as a DJ and with a supporting band or sound system, including the first five of six The Gathering events held New Year’s Eve near Nelson in New Zealand’s South Island from 1996 to 2000.

In addition to his own national tours to support album releases, other notable performances include:

- 1996 Big Day Out (as DJ for hip hop group Dark Tower)
- 1998 Rippon Music Festival
- 1998 support for DJ Vadim performances in Christchurch and Dunedin
- 1999 support for Rockers Hi-Fi tour of New Zealand
- 1999 support for The Mad Professor tour of New Zealand
- 1999 Sweetwaters Music Festival near Auckland
- 2000 support for Moby live in Auckland
- 2002 Alpine Unity at Flock Hill in the South Island high country
- 2003, 2004 Destinations Music Festival
- 2007 Parihaka International Peace Festival
- 2010, 2011 Island Vibe Festival in Australia
- 2013 Rhythm & Alps Festival in South Island high country

Schwalger’s live performances often feature VJ Tim Budgen (Warp TV), who regularly performs with New Zealand drum’n’bass group Shapeshifter.

== Other work ==
Since 2016, Schwalger has developed a videography business in the West Coast, Nomad AV, serving local business and government organisations. He is a drone camera operator and manages all aspects of audio and video production and post-production.

Schwalger has provided audio production education since the 2000s, teaching electronic music production, mixing, recording and mastering. In recent years Schwalger has delivered audio production courses and DJ tuition through local high schools, and conducted workshops in livestreaming with VJ Tim Budgen (WarpTV, Shapeshifter).

The Nomad has also collaborated with visual artist Michel Tuffery on the audio to accompany Tuffery’s First Contact installation, which was projected across a whole building side of Te Papa, the national museum of New Zealand. Schwalger has also collaborated with artists Shane Cotton, John Pule and Richard Nunns.

== Discography ==
Albums

- Movement (1998)
- Second Selection (1999)
- Level 3 (2001)
- Step 4th (2003)
- Quinessence (2005)
- Perilous Times (2011)
- 7 (2014)

Compilations

- Selected Works (2009)
- Infinite I, II, III (2023–24)

Singles / Eps

- Movement (1998) ft Pearl Runga
- Where Are You (1999) ft Lotus
- Concentrated EP (2000)
- Better Stand Up (2002) ft MC Antsman & MC Rizla
- Destinations (2003)
- Letz Play (2005) ft MC Free & MC Ras stone2005
- Breaking Rocks (2008)
- Deeper (2011) ft Satitah & Jornick
- Brok Out (2014) ft Lotek
- Momentum (2024) ft Michèle Ducray

Remixes

- Salmonella Dub, For the Love of It Version 2 (1999) – The Nomad remix
- Oakley Grenell, Jaded (2002) – The Nomad remix
- The Black Seeds, Coming Back Home (2003) – The Nomad Home Again Remix
- King Kapisi and Luciano, Stand (2009) – The Nomad remix
- Sweet Az Sound System, Blaze (2011) – The Nomad remix
- Wildcookie, Touchy Touchy (2014) – The Nomad remix
