= Spanish Gypsy (disambiguation) =

Spanish Gypsies are Romani people in Spain. Spanish Gypsy may also refer to:

- The Spanish Gypsy, an English Jacobean tragicomedy, dating from 1623.
- The Spanish Gypsy, an 1868 dramatic poem by George Eliot
- The Spanish Gypsy (film), a 1911 short silent drama film directed by D. W. Griffith.
- The Spanish version of Gypsy (Shakira song)
- Spanish gypsy scale, a musical scale more commonly known as Phrygian dominant scale.
