= TSS Carlotta =

Inactive ferry

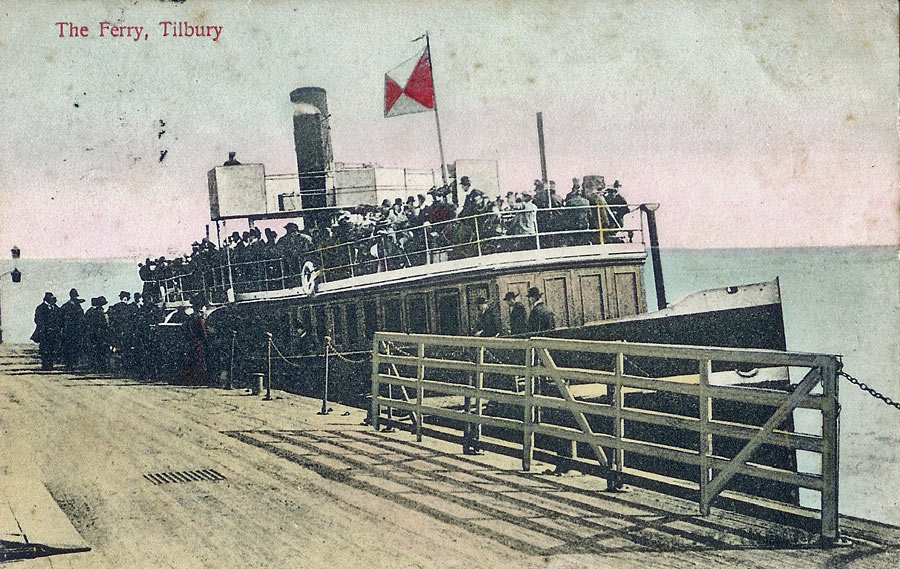
- Carlotta in 1905

History
- Name: 1893–1941: Carlotta; 1941: Gypsy
- Operator: 1893–1912: London, Tilbury and Southend Railway; 1912–1923: Midland Railway; 1923–1930: London, Midland and Scottish Railway
- Port of registry: (United Kingdom)
- Route: Tilbury-Gravesend
- Builder: A. W. Robertson and Company, Canning Town
- Yard number: 70
- Launched: 21 November 1892
- Completed: 13 January 1893
- Out of service: 1930
- Fate: Bombed 11 May 1941

General characteristics
- Tonnage: 261 gross register tons (GRT)
- Length: 124.6 feet (38.0 m)
- Beam: 32.4 feet (9.9 m)
- Depth: 7.6 feet (2.3 m)

TSS Carlotta was a London, Tilbury and Southend Railway passenger ferry, in service between Tilbury and Gravesend from 1893 until 1930.

== History ==
TSS Carlotta was built by A. W. Robertson and Company, Canning Town, West Ham, Essex (now in London), as Yard No.70 for the London, Tilbury and Southend Railway as a Gravesend-Tilbury Ferry. She was their first twin-screw vessel and was launched on 21 November 1892. Carlotta was delivered to the railway company on 13 January 1893 after running successful trials.

She was acquired by the Midland Railway in 1912 and by the London Midland and Scottish Railway in 1923 as the railway changed hands.

In 1930 the ferry was reported to have been scrapped. However, she was resold to the Essex Yacht Club and became their floating clubhouse at Leigh-on-Sea.

On 1 February 1941 Carlotta was requisitioned by the Admiralty as a depot ship for the auxiliary patrol service, and renamed Gypsy (the name of her predecessor as clubhouse at Leigh-on-Sea). She was sunk by aircraft bombing off Tower Pier, London on 11 May 1941.
