= Prochloron =

Scientific classification
- Domain: Bacteria
- Kingdom: Bacillati
- Phylum: Cyanobacteriota
- Class: Cyanophyceae
- Order: Synechococcales
- Family: Prochloraceae
- Genus: Prochloron; R.A.Lewin, 1977

Species
- P. didemni (Lewin, 1977) = Synechocystis didemni

Genus of bacteria

Prochloron (from the Greek pro (before) and the Greek chloros (green) ) is a genus of unicellular oxygenic photosynthetic prokaryotes commonly found as an extracellular symbiont on coral reefs, particularly in didemnid ascidians (sea squirts). Part of the phylum cyanobacteria, it was theorized (endosymbiotic theory) that Prochloron is a predecessor of chloroplasts, components found in photosynthetic eukaryotic cells. However, this theory is largely refuted by phylogenetic studies which indicate Prochloron is not on the same line of descent that lead to the chloroplasts of algae and land plants.

Prochloron was discovered in 1975 by Ralph A. Lewin of the Scripps Institution of Oceanography. Prochloron is one of three known prochlorophytes – cyanobacteria that contain both chlorophyll a and b bound to light-harvesting proteins. The other prochlorophytes are Prochlorococcus marinus, an open-ocean species, and Prochlorothrix hollandica, a filamentous freshwater species. Surprisingly, unlike most cyanobacteria, Prochloron do not contain the red or blue pigments called phycobilins, seen in many species of cyanobacteria. Repeated unsuccessful attempts to culture Prochloron outside a host make them the only known obligate photosymbionts in the phylum Chordata.

Strictly speaking, the name "Prochloron" Lewin 1977 was not validly published under either ICNP or ICNafp. The two codes do each have a valid version of the genus:

- Prochloron Lewin 1977 ex Hoffmann and Greuter 1993, valid under ICNafp
- Prochloron (ex Lewin 1977) Florenzano et al. 1986, valid under ICNP by being published in Int. J. Syst. Bacteriol.

Lewin originally placed Prochloron in a new family Prochloraceae, new order Prochlorales and a new algal division Prochlorophyta. In 1986, Florenzano et al. published Prochloraceae and Prochlorales under the bacterial code, within the class Photobacteria. Komarek listed Prochlorococcus with Prochloron in Prochloraceae, and assigned the family to Synechococcales, but opined that the two genera are not closely related.

LPSN, citing Strunecky et al. 2023 as source, places Prochloron in Microcystaceae, but this is a mistake because Strunecky et al. 2023 clearly place Prochloron in Prochloraceae.

== Species ==
The only taxonomically valid species is P. didemni. Again there is a version in each of the two Codes.
