= Prochloraceae =

Scientific classification
- Domain: Bacteria
- Kingdom: Bacillati
- Phylum: Cyanobacteriota
- Class: Cyanophyceae
- Order: Synechococcales
- Family: Prochloraceae; R. A. Lewin

Genera
- Prochlorococcus Chisholm et al. 1992; Prochloron Lewin 1977

Family of bacteria

Prochloraceae is the previous name of a family of cyanobacteria which has been designated as an "illegitimate name" by ICNP. The correct name has been validly published as Microcystaceae.
