= Chamaesiphon amethystinus =

Scientific classification
- Domain: Bacteria
- Kingdom: Bacillati
- Phylum: Cyanobacteriota
- Class: Cyanophyceae
- Order: Synechococcales
- Family: Chamaesiphonaceae
- Genus: Chamaesiphon
- Species: C. amethystinus

Binomial name
- Chamaesiphon amethystinus (Rostafinski) Lemmermann

Synonyms
- Sphaerogonium amethystinum Rostafinski

Freshwater bacteria smaller than 10 micrometers

Chamaesiphon amethystinus is a freshwater species of cyanobacterium measuring up to 10 micrometres.
