= Kuroshio Current =

North-flowing current in the northwest Pacific Ocean

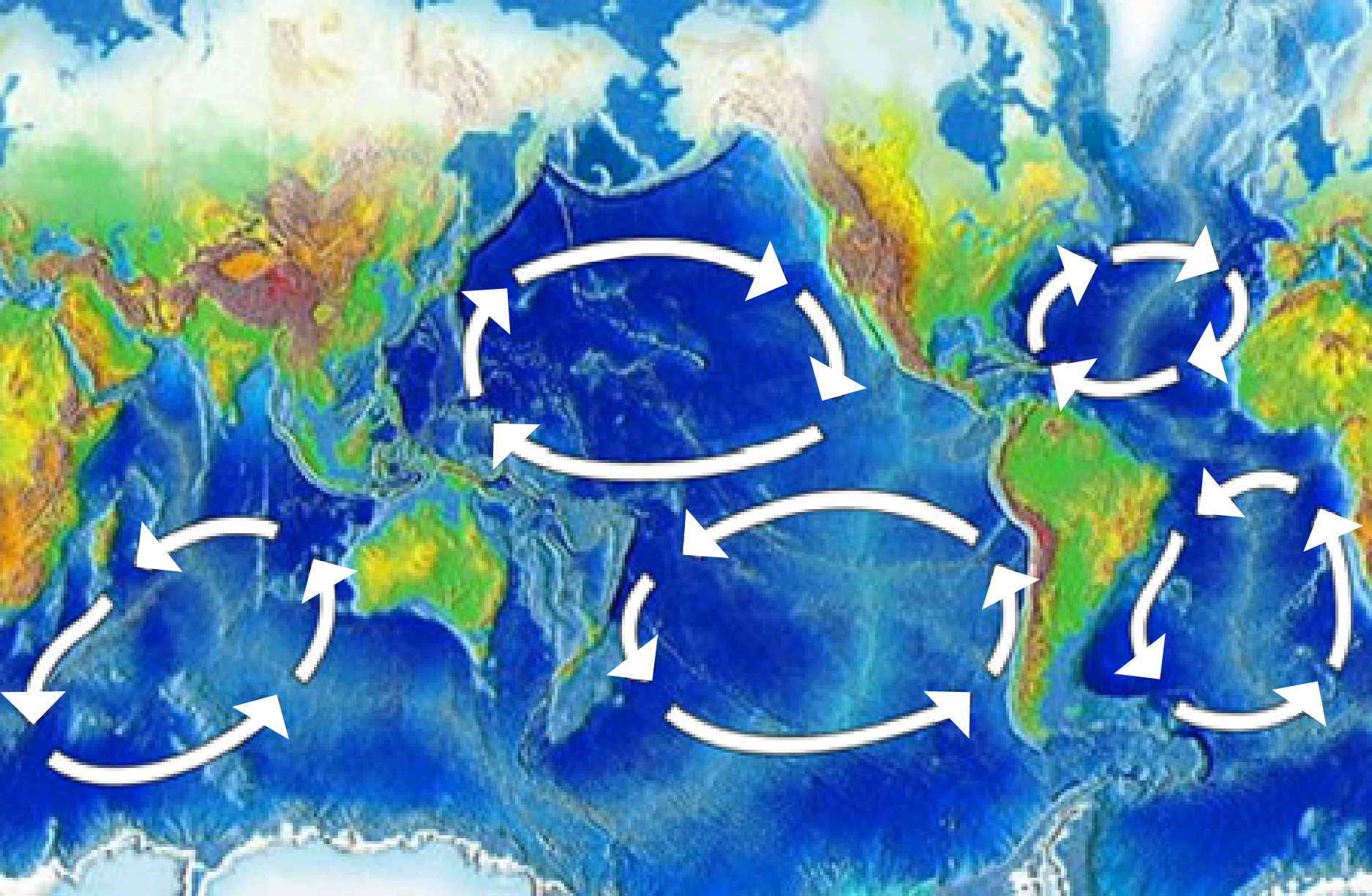
The Kuroshio Current is the west side of the clockwise North Pacific ocean gyre.

The Kuroshio Current (黒潮, Kuroshio; Japanese pronunciation: [kɯ̈̀.ɾó̞.ɕí.ó̞] lit. 'Black Stream'), also known as the Black Current or Japan Current (日本海流, Nihon Kairyū, Nippon-; [ɲ̟ì.hó̞ŋ́ kä́ì.ɾʲjɨ̀ɨ̀, ɲ̟ìp̚.pó̞ŋ́-]), is a north-flowing, warm ocean current on the west side of the North Pacific Ocean basin. It was named for the deep blue appearance of its waters. Similar to the Gulf Stream in the North Atlantic, the Kuroshio is a powerful western boundary current that transports warm equatorial water poleward and forms the western limb of the North Pacific Subtropical Gyre. Off the East Coast of Japan, it merges with the Oyashio Current to form the North Pacific Current.

The Kuroshio Current has significant effects on both physical and biological processes of the North Pacific Ocean, including nutrient and sediment transport, major Pacific storm tracks and regional climate, and Pacific mode water formation. Additionally, the current's significant nutrient transport results in a biologically rich ecoregion supporting an important fishing industry as well as diverse marine food webs. The South China Sea for example has relatively low nutrient concentrations in its upper waters, but experiences enhanced biological productivity due to the input from the Kuroshio Current Intrusion. Ongoing research centered around the Kuroshio Current's response to climate change predicts a strengthening in surface flows of this western boundary current which contrasts the predicted changes in the Atlantic Ocean's Gulf Stream.

Since the early 20th century, anthropologists have debated the role of the current in Japanese culture. Today, historians are reevaluating the role of the current as a factor in Japan's economic development.

== History ==
The Kuroshio current was discovered in 1565 by Andrés de Urdaneta, a native of Guipuzcoa, colonial administrator, supervisor of nautical expeditions, Corregidor, Augustinian monk and loyal navigator in the service of King Philip II, when, aboard the nao San Pedro, he was the first to open the "tornaviaje" between Cebu (Philippines) and the coasts of Old California (New Spain). The secret of the tornaviaje gave Spain absolute hegemony over the Pacific Ocean for centuries, a hegemony that was embodied in the so-called "Manila galleon". The existence of the Kuroshio Current was known to other Europeans from as early as 1650. This was shown in a map drawn by Bernhardus Varenius. As well as this, it was also noted by Captain J. King during a British expedition under Captain James Cook.

Historians have debated the current’s role in structuring the economic geography of Japan, especially at the time before steam navigation. The current’s path influenced the development of fisheries and whaling businesses that grew in the early modern period in specific regions. Its movement was also a factor in the development of maritime routes for domestic shipping as well as international navigation along the shores of Japan. In the mid-19th century, the current became an object of oceanographic interest both in Japan and abroad. The ideological effect of scientific conquest and industrial appropriation of the Kuroshio by the Japanese Empire has been likened to a frontier incorporation.

== Physical properties ==
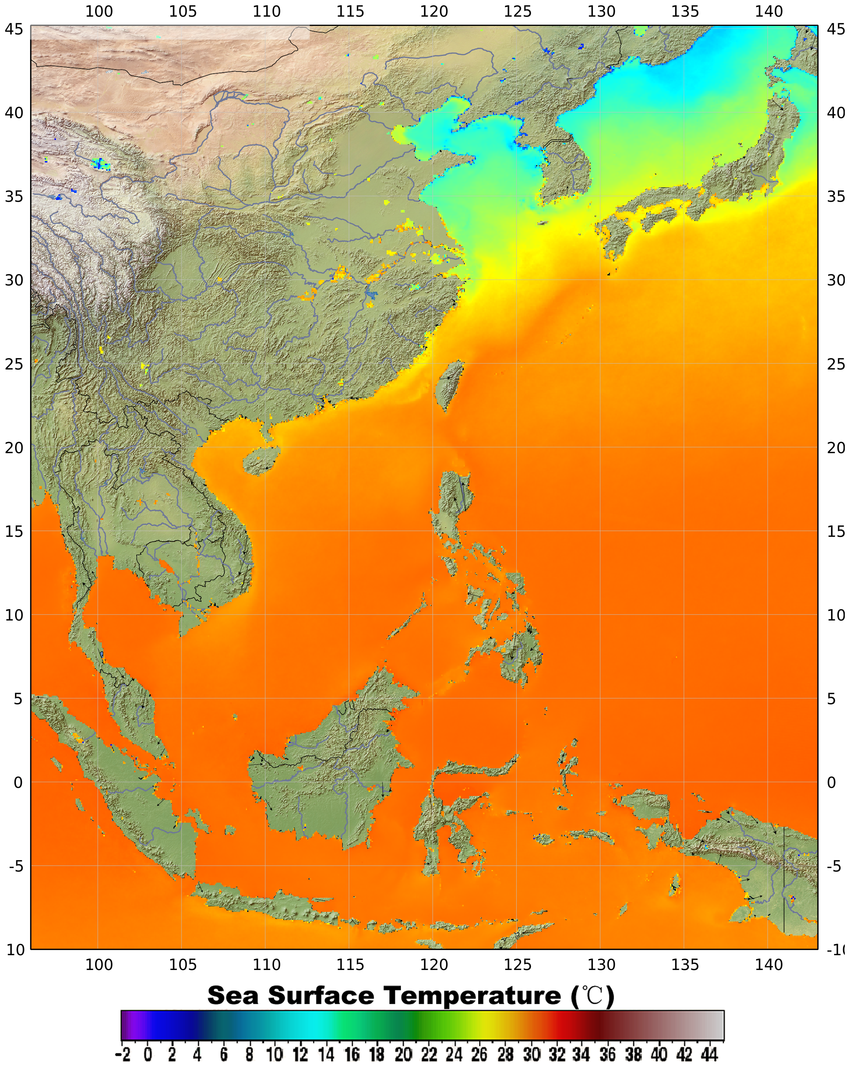
Averaged winter sea surface temperatures in the western Pacific Ocean using satellite data. The Kuroshio current is warm, compared to cooler waters in the Yellow Sea, and Sea of Japan.

The Kuroshio is a relatively warm ocean current with an annual average sea-surface temperature of about 24 °C (75 °F), is approximately 100 kilometres (62 mi) wide, and produces frequent small to meso-scale eddies. The Kuroshio originates from the Pacific North Equatorial Current, which splits in two at the east coast of Luzon, Philippines, to form the southward-flowing Mindanao Current and the more significant northward-flowing Kuroshio Current. East of Taiwan, the Kuroshio enters the East China Sea through a deep break in the Ryukyu island chain known as the Yonaguni Depression. The Kuroshio then continues northwards and parallel to the Ryukyu islands, steered by the deepest part of the East China Sea, the Okinawa Trough, before leaving the East China Sea and re-entering the Pacific through the Tokara Strait. It then flows along the southern margin of Japan but meanders significantly. At the Bōsō Peninsula, the Kuroshio finally separates from the Japanese coast and travels eastward as the Kuroshio Extension. The Kuroshio Current is the Pacific analogue of the Gulf Stream in the Atlantic Ocean, transporting warm, tropical water northward toward the polar region.

The Kuroshio's counterparts associated with the North Pacific Gyre are the: east flowing North Pacific Current to the north, the south flowing California Current to the east, and the west flowing North Equatorial Current to the south. The warm waters of the Kuroshio Current sustain the coral reefs of Japan, the northernmost coral reefs in the world. The part of the Kuroshio that branches into the Sea of Japan is called Tsushima Current (対馬海流, Tsushima Kairyū).

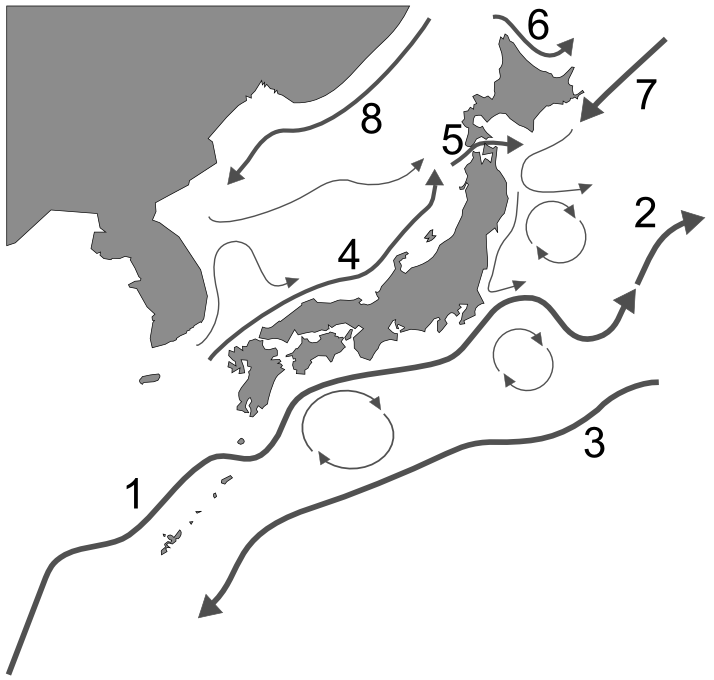
The ocean currents surrounding the Japanese archipelago: 1. Kuroshio 2. Kuroshio extension 3. Kuroshio countercurrent 4. Tsushima Current 5. Tsugaru Current 6. Sōya Current 7. Oyashio 8. Liman Current

Similar to the Atlantic Ocean's Gulf Stream, the Kuroshio Current creates warm ocean surface temperatures, and significant moisture in the atmosphere along the western Pacific basin, and thus produces and sustains tropical cyclones. Tropical cyclones, also known as typhoons, are formed when atmospheric instability, warm ocean surface temperatures, and moist air are combined to fuel an atmospheric low-pressure system. The Western North Pacific Ocean experiences an average of 25 typhoons annually. The majority of typhoons occur from July through October during northern hemisphere summer, and typically form where the Kuroshio Current is the warmest near the equator. Typhoons tend to track along the current's warm water poleward until they dissipate in colder waters.

The strength (transport) of the Kuroshio varies along its path and seasonally. Within the Sea of Japan, observations suggest that the Kuroshio transport is relatively steady at about 25 Sv (25 million cubic metres per second). The Kuroshio strengthens significantly when it rejoins the Pacific Ocean, reaching 65 Sv (65 million cubic metres per second) southeast of Japan, although this transport has significant seasonal variability. The Kuroshio Current splits into Kuroshio Current extension and the Tsushima Current, as the currents wrap around Japanese Island and reconnects, changes in flow will impact the flows of the other currents.

The path of the Kuroshio may have been different in the geologic past based on historical sea level and bathymetry, however there is currently conflicting scientific evidence. It has been proposed that lower sea-level and tectonics may have prevented the Kuroshio from entering the Sea of Japan during the last glacial period, approximately c. 115,000 – c. 11,700 years ago, and remained entirely within the Pacific basin. However, other proxies and ocean models have alternatively suggested that the Kuroshio path was relatively unaltered, possibly as far back as 700,000 years ago.

=== Sediment transport ===
The magnitude of the Kuroshio Current and seafloor bathymetry results in deep sea erosion and sediment transport in multiple regions. Offshore of Southern Taiwan on the Kenting Plateau erosion is likely caused by the strong bottom currents which increase in velocity along the rise on this plateau. The bottom water accelerates as it travels from a depth of 3500 m to a depth around 400–700 m. The increase in current velocity exacerbates erosion revealing the Kuroshio Knoll, a 3 km × 7 km bean-shaped elevated flat area 60–70 m below surface levels in comparison to the rest of the Plateau which located at around 400–700 m. The Plateau is being uplifted and is balanced with erosion.

The granulometry of the Kenting Plateau and surrounding area demonstrates the eroding qualities of the Kuroshio Current. The sediment grain size of the sand varies along the edge of the Plateau. The deeper down the edge, the larger the grains as smaller grains are swept away by the current. Some of these fine sand particles have settled into a dune field while the remaining sediment is transported and deposited throughout the region by the Kuroshio Current.

The Kuroshio Current also transports Yangtze River sediment. The amount of sediment transport is highly dependent on the relationship between the Kuroshio Current intrusion, the China Coastal Current, and the Taiwan Warm Current. The Yangtze River sediment is being deposited on the East China Sea inner shelf rather than the deep sea due to the interaction of the three currents.

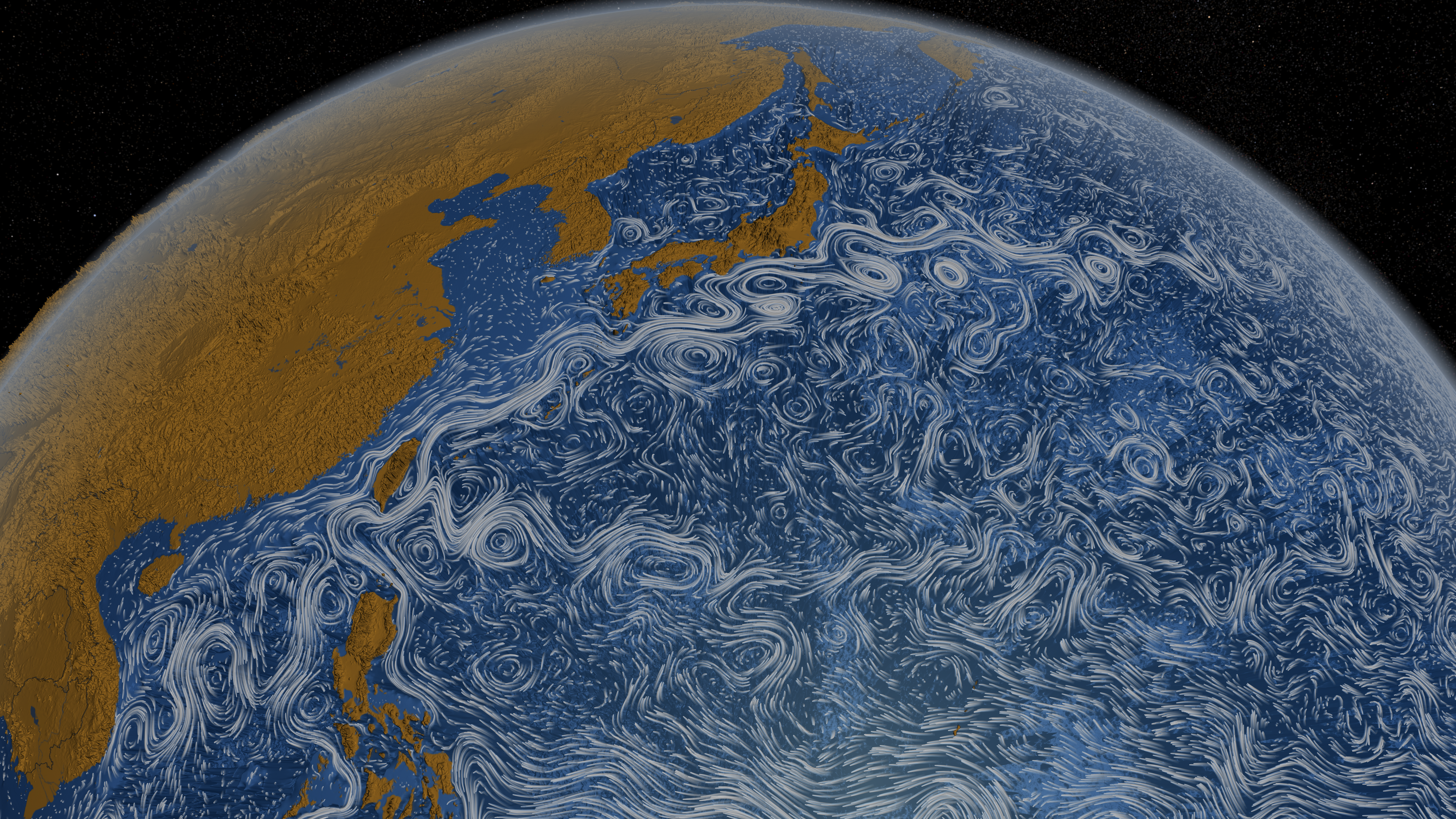
The Kuroshio Current, as idealized from space. The resulting circulation and eddying demonstrate the mixing caused by the input of warm equatorial water poleward. Image by NASA Goddard Space Flight Center.

Distinct elemental characteristics of sediments from differing sources permits tracking sources of sediments within the Kuroshio. Taiwanese sediment notably contains illite and chlorite. These traceable compounds have been found all the way through the Kuroshio Current up into its branch through the Kuroshio Current Intrusion in the South China Sea. The South China Sea branch of the Kuroshio and the cyclonic eddy west of Luzon Island impact Luzon and Pearl River sediments. The Luzon sediment containing high levels of smectite is unable to travel northwestward. The Pearl River sediments contains high levels of kaolinite and titanium (Ti) and is trapped above the abyssal basin between Hainan Island and the Pearl River mouth. These compounds allow scientists to track sediment transport throughout the Kuroshio Current.

=== Eddies ===
There are indications that eddies contribute to the preservation and survival of fish larvae transported by the Kuroshio. Plankton biomass fluctuates yearly and is typically highest in the eddy area of the Kuroshio's edge. Warm-core rings are not known for having high productivity. However, there is evidence of equal distribution of biological productivity throughout the warm-core rings from the Kuroshio Current, supported by the upwelling at the periphery and the convective mixing caused by the cooling of surface water as the rings move north of the current. The thermostad is the deep mixed layer that has discrete boundaries and uniform temperature. Within this layer, nutrient-rich water is brought to the surface, which generates a burst of primary production. Given that the water in the core of a ring has a different temperature regime than the shelf waters, there are times when a warm-core ring is undergoing its spring bloom while the surrounding shelf waters are not.

Western Pacific Ocean tropical cyclone tracks compiled from 1951 to 2026

There are many complex interactions within warm-core rings and thus, lifetime productivity is not very different from the surrounding shelf water. A study from 1998 found that the primary productivity within a warm-core ring was almost the same as in the cold jet outside it, with evidence of upwelling of nutrients within the ring. In addition, there was discovery of dense populations of phytoplankton at the nutricline within a ring, presumably supported by the upward mixing of nutrients. Furthermore, there have been acoustic studies in the warm-core ring, which showed intense sound scattering from zooplankton and fish populations in the ring and very sparse acoustic signals outside of it.

=== Typhoons ===
Typhoons can produce intense winds which push on the surface layer of the ocean for brief periods of time. These winds induce the warmer surface layer of the ocean to mix with the deeper cooler layer of water that is situated below the pycnocline. This mixing introduces nutrients from deeper cooler water to the warmer surface layer of the ocean. Organisms such as phytoplankton and algae use these newly introduced nutrients to grow. In 2003, two typhoons induced significant surface layer mixing as they passed through the region. This mixing directly produced two algal bloom events in the North Western Pacific Ocean that negatively affected Japan.

== Nutrient transport ==
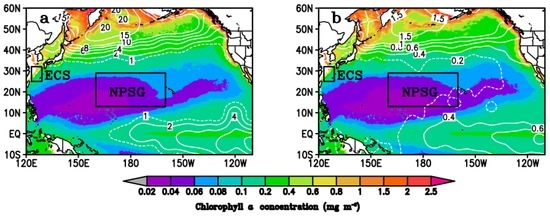
Annual average chlorophyll concentrations are shaded, and annual average surface (A) nitrate and (B) phosphate concentrations are contoured. The Kuroshio Current transports nitrate and phosphate from the South China Sea, increasing productivity.

The Kuroshio Current is considered a nutrient stream because of high nutrient flux from surrounding oligotrophic waters with primary production of 150 to 300 grams of carbon per square meter per year based on SeaWiFS global primary productivity estimates. The current transports significant amounts of nutrients to support this primary production from the East China Sea continental shelf to the subarctic Pacific Ocean. The maximum chlorophyll value is found around 100 metres (330 ft) depth. Its importance in nutrient transport is demonstrated by the nutrient rich water in the Kuroshio Current is surrounded by ambient water of the same density with lower relative nutrient levels. The downstream of the Kuroshio Current receives large amounts of nutrients at rates of 100–280 kmol N*s-1. Nutrients are brought to the surface water from deeper layers where the Kuroshio Current flows over shallow areas and seamounts. This process occurs over the Okinawa Trough and the Tokara Strait. The Tokara Strait also has high cyclonic activity where the Kuroshio Current passes through. This in combination with the Coriolis effect causes intense upwelling along the continental shelf. This upwelling and nutrient transport into surface layers is essential for primary production because these vital nutrients would otherwise be inaccessible to phytoplankton which need to remain in upper layers where sunlight is available for them to perform photosynthesis. The constant transport of nutrient rich waters to regions with high levels of light therefore supports increased photosynthesis supporting the rest of the biologically diverse ecosystem associated with the Kuroshio current.

== Marine life ==
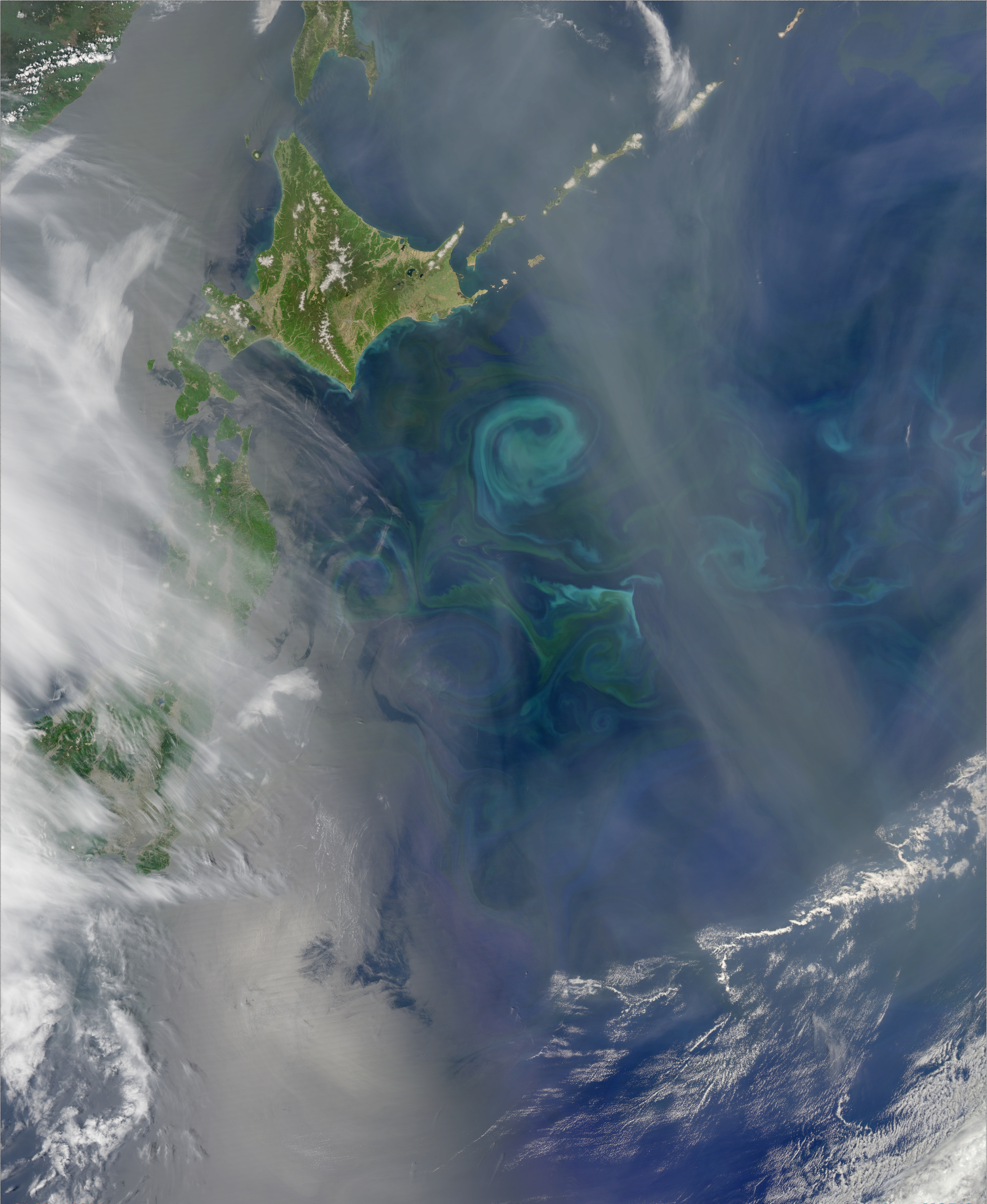
The Oyashio Current colliding with the Kuroshio Current near Hokkaido. When two currents collide, they create eddies. Phytoplankton growing in the surface waters become concentrated along the boundaries of these eddies, tracing out the motions of the water.

The transportation of nutrients, heat and plankton by the Kuroshio Current and the current's transection of multiple different waterbodies gives way to high species richness in and adjacent to this current. In addition, the Kuroshio is classified as a biodiversity hotspot, meaning the waters circulating through the region are host to many different species, yet many of its resident organisms are at risk of becoming endangered or are already at the brink of extinction as a result of local and/or global human activity. Overfishing and overharvest are the primary risks for many of the threatened or endangered species here.

=== Photoautotrophs ===
==== Phytoplankton ====
Phytoplankton are responsible for the aforementioned high rates of primary productivity within the current. Warm sea surface temperatures and low turbidity in the region lead to clearer waters which allows for deeper penetration of sunlight and an extension of the epipelagic zone. These particular characteristics, along with lower nutrient availability within the current, correspond well with the requirements of two specific cyanobacteria: Prochlorococcus and Synechococcus. Prochlorococcus is the dominant species of picophytoplankton within the Kuroshio Current and these two species may be responsible for as much as half of the fixation of CO_{2} in the entire Kuroshio Current photic zone. Further, there are substantial dust deposition events in this region due to Asian Dust Storms from the Gobi desert. During these events, dust clouds transport and deposit phosphate and trace metals which subsequently stimulate growth in both Prochlorococcus and Synechococcus as well as diatoms.

Diatoms and Trichodesmium are speculated to play an important role in the redistribution of nitrogen and carbon in and out of the euphotic zone. Trichodesmium is an abundant diazotroph that directly correlates with overall nitrogen fixation within the current. This nitrogen fixation supplies a limiting nutrient (nitrate), to other photoautotrophs for growth and reproduction. Meanwhile, in areas influenced by upwelling with higher nutrient and carbon concentrations, diatoms are important contributors to carbon and nitrogen out of the euphotic zone due to the weight of their "glass houses" made of silica and their tendencies to sink.

==== Macro-flora ====
At least ten genera of seaweed reside in waters in and around the Kuroshio Current. Caulerpa, is a green algae that grows densely near shore on the periphery of the Kuroshio Current while brown and red algae also flourish adjacent the current, and like other photosynthesizing organisms, benefit from the nutrient transport and low turbidity of the region.

=== Invertebrates ===
==== Zooplankton ====
An increase in zooplankton biomass occurs in the significantly lower water temperatures of the upwelling sites within the Kuroshio Current due to high phytoplankton concentrations which are nourished by upwelling northeast of Taiwan. This upwelling event, the Kuroshio Current intrusion through the Luzon Strait and South China Sea, and summer monsoons, represent the convergence of a multitude of oceanic waters of different origin. These water convergence zones and subsequent circulation and mixing, have a major influence on the transport and distribution of many zooplankton species causing zooplankton communities to be more nutritious, unique and diverse. High diversity in copepods in waters adjacent the Kuroshio Current have also been reported. Two dominant copepod species of the current, C. sinicus and E. concinna, are transported northward in high concentrations by the current from the East China Sea in winter.

Like copepods and diatoms, tunicates, specifically salps and doliolids, also play an important role on the biogeochemical cycle as well as on the food web in the Kuroshio. Salps transport carbon to the region's bottom water with their carbon-rich, fast-sinking fecal pellets and carcasses. Thaliaceans (salps and doliolids) are known to feed a minimum of 202 marine species, however, these animal's blooms have been found to cause harmful feeding conditions for pelagic fishes in the region.

Many species of fish larvae are also found in zooplankton communities transported by the current. Fish larvae are important contributor to the Kuroshio Current system food chain. Baleen whales for instance, make use of the current's transport of Japanese sardine and jack mackerel larvae to their feeding grounds in the north pacific. Climate change is reported to alter endemic fish larvae distribution. A fish species composition change analysis by Lu and Lee (2014) showed changes in fish larvae distribution have occurred during the region and suggest this altered clustering is associated with changes in the intensities and flow rates of the Kuroshio Current. These changes impacts the food chain below and above this trophic level. This can influence fish migration, fish population's at large and major fisheries.

The Kuroshio Current has an influence of several species of foraminifera, including species G. ruber and P. obliquiloculate. G. ruber is normally a surface dweller and was found at depths of 1000 meters along the Kuroshio Current. P. obliquiloculate normally resides between 25 and 100 m, yet was found deep in the abyssal basin (>1000 m). The distribution of these species in comparison to their standard dwelling depths observed by Gallagher (2015) demonstrates the ability of this intrusion and the overall Kuroshio Current's to redistribute nutrients vertically making nutrients available many different species with differing requirements for prosperity.

==== Coral ====
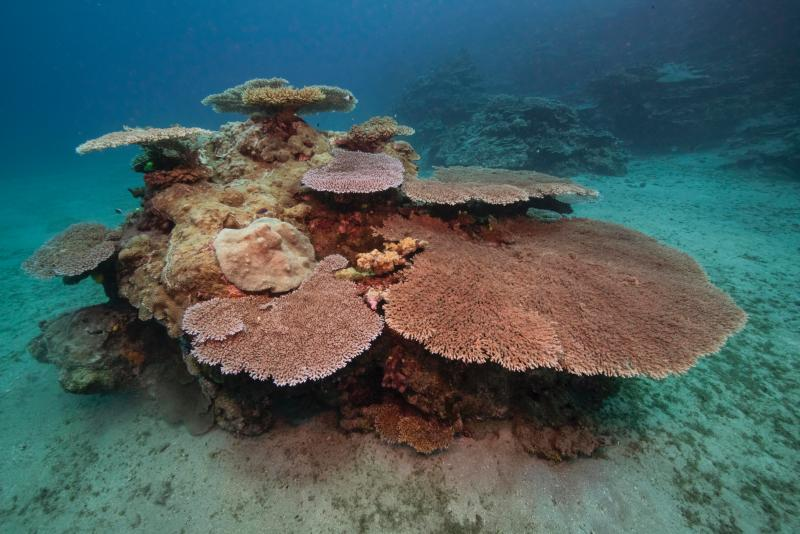
Acropora hyacinthus is a reef-building coral native to coral reefs in the Kuroshio Current region.

The coral reefs within the Kuroshio Current reside at a higher latitude than any other tropical reef placement in the world (33.48°N). An important reef-building coral to this area, Heliopora coerulea, has been listed as threatened due to anthropogenic stressors to its environment such as: warming sea surface temperatures from climate change, ocean acidification from anthropogenic greenhouse gas emissions and dynamite fishing. Studies confirming low genotypic diversity within the species further emphasizes this blue coral's threatened status.

Acropora japonica, Acropora secale, and Acropora hyacinthus are 3 more reef-building corals in the region. These species utilize symbiotic relationships with zooxanthellae, peridinin and pyrrhoxanthin, as a source of carotenoids.

In addition to anthropogenic, threats, these corals also have predators in the region such as the Crown-of-thorns starfish, Acanthaster planci, and a regional sea snail, Drupella fragum. The Crown-of-thorns starfish feeds on corals. When conditions are favorable, the population of this native starfish can explode, resulting in significant damage on entire coral communities, as well as the ecosystems these coral reefs support. A Crown-of-thorns starfish outbreak in conjunction with anthropogenic stressors can cause irreversible reef-system damage.

The Kuroshio Current controls patterns of connectivity between coral reefs (as well as other marine organisms with a larval phase), transporting larvae from southerly coral reefs to downstream reefs along the Ryukyu Arc.

==== Squid ====
Western boundary currents are used by certain species of squid for rapid and easy transport, allowing mature squid to travel with minimum energy expenditure to exploit rich northern feeding grounds, while eggs and larvae develop in the warm current waters during winter. The Japanese flying squid (Todarodes pacificus), for example, has three populations that breed in winter, summer, and autumn. The winter spawning group is associated with the Kuroshio Current, because following spawning events in January to April in the East China Sea the larvae and juveniles travel north with the Kuroshio Current. They are turned inshore and are caught between the islands of Honshu and Hokkaido during the summer. The summer spawning is in another part of the East China Sea, from which the larvae are entrained into the Tsushima current that flows north between the islands of Japan and the mainland. Afterward, the current meets a southward flowing cold coastal current, the Liman Current. The group of squid spawned in the summer are traditionally found around the boundary between the two currents, sustaining rich fisheries. In fact, studies have reported that annual catches in Japan have gradually increased since the late 1980s and it has been proposed that changing environmental conditions have caused the autumn and winter spawning areas in the Tsushima Strait and near the Goto Islands to overlap. In addition, winter spawning sites over the continental shelf and slope in the East China Sea are expanding.

=== Vertebrates ===
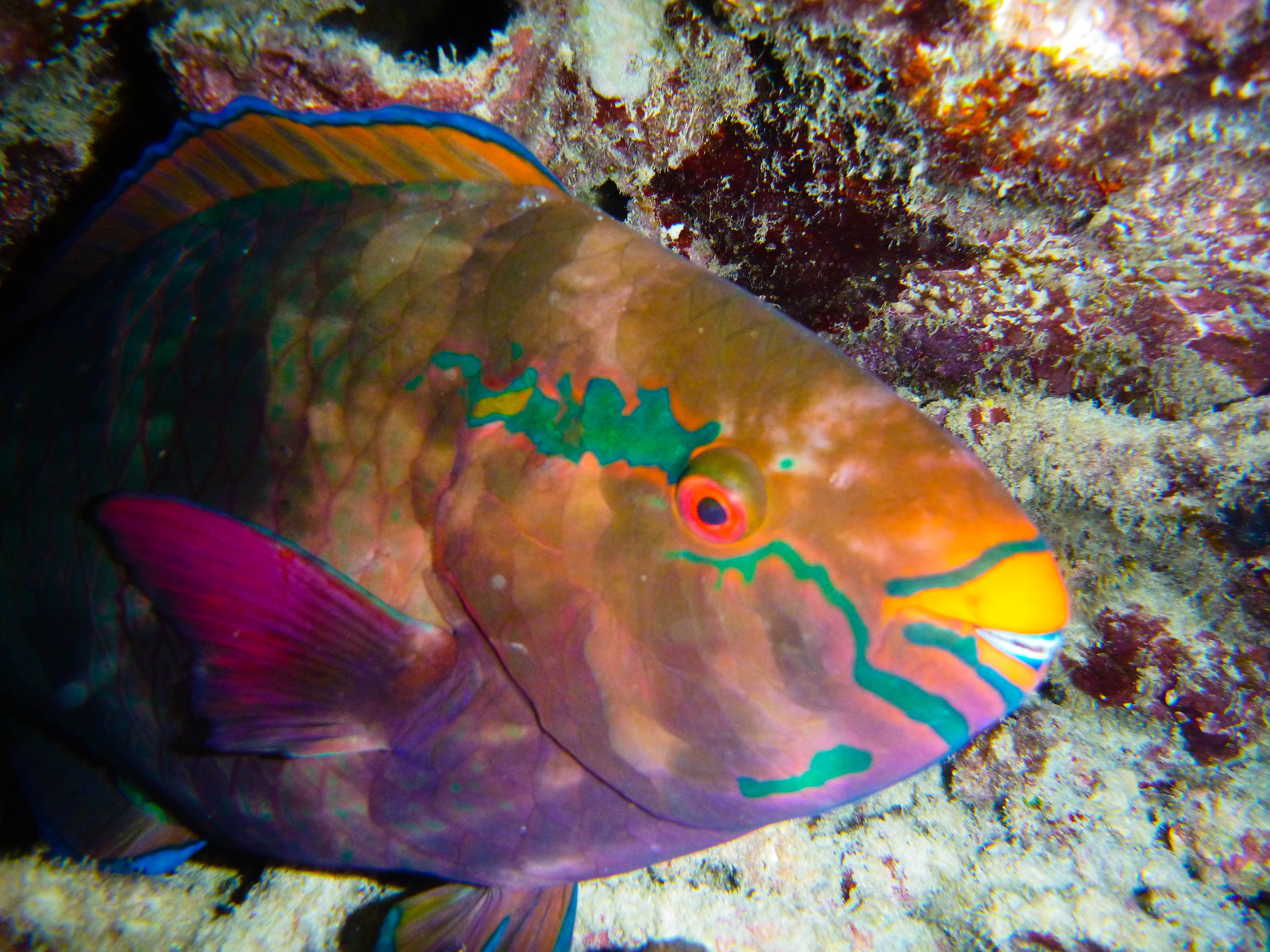
Parrotfish (Scarus frenatus) are reef fish commonly found in the Kuroshio Current reef systems.

==== Fish ====
The Kuroshio Current is home to thousands of fish species occupying nutrient rich and diverse waters in this region. This expansive biomass is influenced by elevated rates of primary production leading to large biomass in the lower trophic levels, facilitated by warmer local oceanic and atmospheric conditions. Resident fish of this area include reef fish like rabbitfish and parrotfish, pelagic fishes such as sardines, anchovies, mackerel, and sailfish, and higher trophic predators such as sharks.

Fisheries have a strong presence in this area and depend strongly on the changing oceanic conditions, largely dependent on the Kuroshio Current. To the north, the Oyashio Current contains subarctic water that is much colder and fresher than the resident water east of Honshu, and the intersection of these two currents is called the Kuroshio-Oyashio region. Here, local oceanographic conditions vary through the year and determine the species assemblage and thus the success of fisheries. For example, when the Oyashio current is well developed and protrudes southward, the cold waters are favorable for capturing sardines. Additionally, when larger meandering flow develops in the Kuroshio Current, sardine availability elevates due to the proximity of the Kuroshio to the southern spawning grounds of sardine. Thus, intrusion and flow paths of these currents affect presence, biomass, and catch of species such as pollock, sardine, and anchovy.

==== Marine reptiles ====
Five out of the seven sea turtle species on earth, loggerheads (Caretta caretta), green (Chelonia mydas), hawksbill (Eretmochelys imbricata), leatherbacks (Dermochelys coriacea), and Olive ridleys (Lepidochelys olivacea), utilize the Kuroshio Current to access warm waters. Female sea turtles utilize the transport potential of the current to access the warm nesting beaches of Japan's shores, and adolescent green and hawksbill turtles utilize the current transport to access waters surrounding Japan.

==== Marine mammals ====
Marine mammals such as seals, sea lions and cetaceans also make use of the high biodiversity within the Kuroshio Current. Charismatic megafauna odontocetes in this region include the Spinner dolphin (Stenella longirostris), short-finned pilot whale (Globicephala macrorhynchus), common bottlenose dolphin (Tursiops truncatus), Dall's porpoise (Phocoenoides dalli), Risso's dolphin (Grampus griseus) and the killer whale (Orcinus orca). Three types of whales of the same genus (Balaenoptera) also use this rich area for feeding grounds, including the common Minke (Balaenoptera acutorostrata), the sei whale (Balaenoptera borealis) and Bryde's whale (Balaenoptera edeni). The availability of Japanese sardines and mackerel eggs, larvae, and juveniles are the baleen whales' primary food sources in these areas. Top-tier trophic predators can serve as units in developing conservation management in this region.

== Carbonate chemistry ==
The ocean absorbs approximately one third of the CO_{2} produced by fossil fuel combustion, cement production, and deforestation. One of the more significant oceanic sinks for atmospheric CO_{2} is the Kuroshio Current. In its highly biologically productive regions, this uptake of CO_{2} is carbon burial is facilitated by a strong biological pump. In the less productive northern current transition, the Kuroshio remains an important CO_{2} sink, through high CO_{2} solubility. The Kuroshio Extension region is classified as the strongest sink for atmospheric CO_{2} in the North Pacific. This is especially true in the winter when higher amounts of human-produced CO_{2} are taken up in the Kuroshio Extension region when compared with the summer. This is likely explained by cooler temperatures facilitating the solubility of CO_{2} in ocean water. As CO_{2} levels continue to increase in the atmosphere, so does CO_{2} uptake in the Kuroshio, making this seasonality more dramatic.

== Climate implications ==
Western boundary currents are integrated parts in the world's climatic balance. The Kuroshio Current plays an important role in influencing regional climate and weather patterns mainly through the input of warm waters from lower latitudes northward into the western edge of the Pacific basin. Along with the other western boundary currents in the world, the Kuroshio Current is subject to seasonal changes that manifest in different flow rates, bifurcation latitudes, and water salinity. Circulation within the Pacific Ocean is largely influenced by this northerly transport of warm salty water north along the Western boundary, concurrently providing structure to the western edge of the North Pacific Gyre. The resulting heat fluxes in this area represent some of the largest heat exchanges from ocean to atmosphere within the entire Pacific Basin, being more pronounced during the winter season. Heat transfer from the surface ocean to the atmosphere creates unstable atmospheric conditions, which is to say that air parcels and clouds derived or influenced by this process are warmer than the surrounding air, ultimately rising and enhancing chances of precipitation or shifting weather. In this way, monsoonal rain events and common through the summertime and typhoon storms are enhanced as they pass over the current. The climate of many Asian countries has been affected by the distribution of heat by these processes for millions of years, changing wind patterns, precipitation, and mixing warm tropical waters into the Sea of Japan.

=== Mode water formation ===
As the Kuroshio Current separates from the equatorial current and flows northward, warm water from the Western Pacific Warm Pool segues into the northwest Pacific Ocean Basin. Principal heat flux in the Kuroshio occurs via the Kuroshio Extension between 132°E and 160°E and 30°N to 35°N, depending on the latitude where the extension splits off from the Kuroshio Current along the coast of Japan. The process of warm water injection into the open ocean plays an important role in the formation of North Pacific Subtropical Mode waters and the regulation of sea surface temperatures, affecting moisture transport across the western Pacific Basin. North Pacific subtropical mode waters are created when Kuroshio Extension waters lose large amounts of heat and moisture to the cold and dry northerly winds during boreal wintertime months, creating dense salty surface waters prone to sink and cause convection. The temperature range of the sinking North Pacific Subtropical Mode Waters characteristically falls between 16 °C and 19 °C, however exact temperatures and depths to which these waters sink varies annually depending on the efficiency of water transportation by the extension, which is a function of atmospheric and mesoscale eddy conditions. The resulting homogeneous water mass typically separates the seasonal pycnocline from the surface waters in the mid to late summer months, remaining stratified below the warmer surface waters until shoaling back towards the surface with the mixed layer due to storm perturbation in the fall and winter. The contrast between the temperatures of these stratified vertical layers can be discernable such that the lateral advection of mode water can be traced for thousands of kilometers. Mode water formation is variable and largely dependent on the flow intensity of the Kuroshio Extension and atmospheric heat flux efficiencies. Heat flux processes sometimes experience feedbacks that enhance water temperature contrasts and can cause sea surface temperature features to last well past the end of the boreal winter. For example, with residually cooled surface waters in the late spring and early summer months, warm moist air from the south can cause low cloud formation and reflection of solar radiation, extending temporal sea surface cooling.

The Kuroshio Extension is a dynamic but relatively unstable system, with variability in the associated bifurcation latitude occurring on interannual time scales. The cause of these variations and their effects on the surface flow and total transport of waters has been studied extensively, with recent advances in sea surface height satellite altimetry methods allowing for observational studies on larger timescales. Studies suggest that more northerly bifurcation latitudes have been historically correlated with greater surface water transport and mode water formation, associated with less meandering and more direct flow paths closer to the coasts of Japan and Taiwan during the wintertime months.

=== Climate change ===
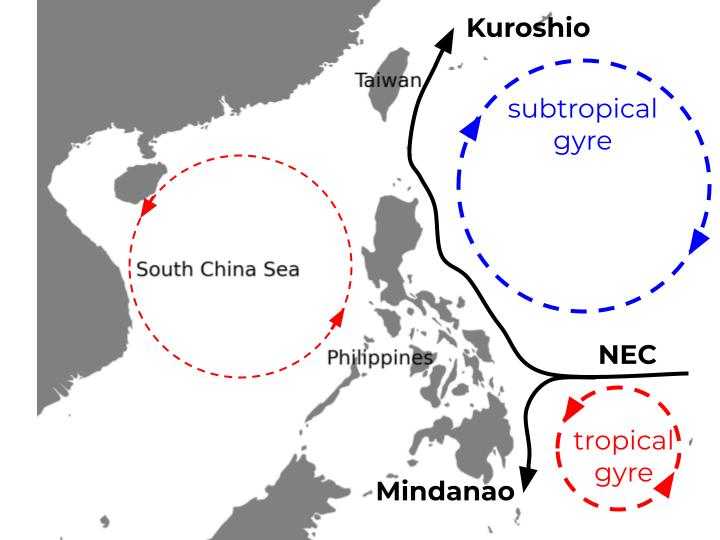
The North Equatorial Current (NEC) splits into the southward flowing Mindanao Current and the northward flowing Kuroshio Current.

Climate change, specifically with respect to increasing sea surface temperatures and decreasing salinity, has been predicted to strengthen the surface flow of the Kuroshio Current as well as other western boundary currents across the Pacific. The predicted effects of warming surface oceans may result in differing impacts between the Atlantic and Pacific oceans; the Atlantic is predicted to experience a slowing of the Atlantic meridional overturning circulation while the Pacific western boundary currents, including the Kuroshio Current, may strengthen. These changes are thought to come as a product of wind stress and surface warming resulting from the increased stratification of the surface layers of future oceans. Specifically, predicted poleward shifting of westerly winds within the Hadley Cell is thought to create conditions in which the subtropical gyre wind stress curl would increase. This could cause an increased total geostrophic circulation and subsequently an intensification of the northern leg of the Kuroshio Current, in some predictions increasing flow velocities by almost double. The entire flow of the current is predicted to be strengthened however, from its point of bifurcation near the equator to the Kuroshio Extension. In addition, the general observed southward migration of both the NEC and SEC subcurrent bifurcation latitudes over the past thirty years has been consistent with a strengthening of western boundary currents. With shifting winds and increased gyre circulation in conjunction with a "business as usual" anthropogenic carbon input scenario, bifurcation latitudes are predicted to continue on poleward migrations into the future, contributing to the intensifying Kuroshio Current.

Predictions are made using methods that combine historical data with oceanic modelling output, and one such study used the Coupled Model Intercomparison Project (CMIP5) to show the Kuroshio Current interacting with the northern extremity of the subtropical gyre, contrasting older predictions of simple gyre "spin up" forced acceleration. Modelling studies have also suggested that increasing stratification will occur with the strengthening of the surface layer current, creating conditions in which the opposite effect could occur in the deeper layer of the Kuroshio Current, which has been proposed to slow. The exact mechanisms causing this change are not well elucidated, however it is expected to be the result of wind stress changes within the gyre in addition to the increased stratification near the surface that may enhance surface and deep ocean layer separation and maintain different responses to warming oceans.

== Economic considerations ==
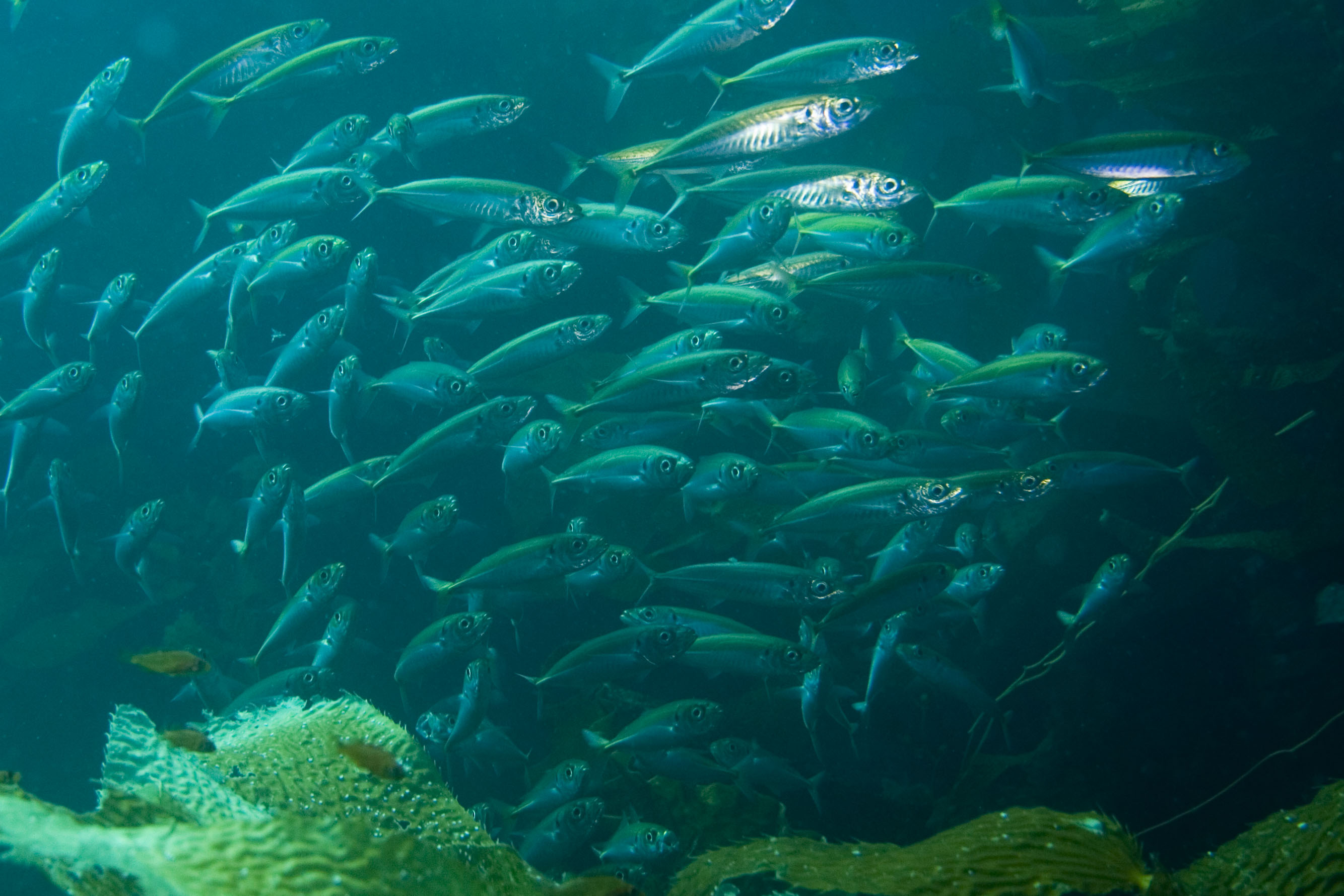
A school of Pacific jack mackerel. Jack mackerel represent a large fishing industry in the Pacific: around 1.5 million pounds were harvested in 2020 by California fisheries alone, creating $272,000 in revenue according to the NOAA Fisheries commercial fishing landings database.

The Kuroshio Current can be useful as a shipping lane as the current can save time and fuel usage when underway with the current. However, ships that travel against the current will spend more time and fuel to compensate for the water flowing against the shipping vessel.

The Kuroshio supports many important fisheries. Jack Mackerel populations are one of the most important fishery resources in Japan, Korea and Taiwan. As the Kuroshio flows northeastward from northeast of Taiwan along the shelf slope of the Eastern China Sea, it carries Jack Mackerel eggs and larvae to southern Japan and Honshu Island. These larvae are caught and then raised in aquaculture through adulthood and harvested. Other important fisheries include pollock, sardine, and anchovy.

There are also many developing port cities along the Kuroshio Current. While the Kuroshio Current is historically known to support many fisheries where it meets with the Oyashio current, this region is still recovering from the Fukushima Daiichi Nuclear Power Plant accident. In 2011, a magnitude 9.0 earthquake triggered a devastating tsunami. This tsunami inundated more than 200 miles of Japan's coastline and drastically altered the sea level in some coastal areas by meters. It killed more than 18,500 people and set off a nuclear disaster at the Fukushima nuclear plant, releasing radiocesium into the surrounding waters. While local water bodies were the most severely affected, this radiocesium was transported as far as the entire North Pacific Ocean by the North Pacific Current which is formed by the collision of the Kuroshio and the Oyashio current. Local fisheries lost over 90% of their fleets and were unable to resume operations for up to a year after the accident. The local economy has been working to return to pre-tsunami levels but, even now, fishery yields have not reached nearly the levels they were before the accident. No catches are made within a 10 km radius to the accident site and even catches outside of that zone are subject to inspection for radioactive materials, costing fisheries both time and money. Minamisanriku had most of the town's port and aquaculture facilities restored by 2014, and as of 2018, reconstruction of key infrastructure in the prefectures of Iwate and Miyagi was near completion. Local Japanese fishing fleets hauled 5,928 tons of seafood product valued at over 2.21 billion yen (19.342 million U.S. dollars) in 2021.

Changes in the Kuroshio Current and its warming conditions have impacted pilot whale migration. These animals are considered a delicacy but hunting is strictly regulated and transitions in migration timing is impacting those who depend on these animals as a source of income. Management practices must consider protecting these animals and recognizing the potential economic impacts on local hunters.
