= Chamaesiphon confervicola =

Scientific classification
- Domain: Bacteria
- Kingdom: Bacillati
- Phylum: Cyanobacteriota
- Class: Cyanophyceae
- Order: Synechococcales
- Family: Chamaesiphonaceae
- Genus: Chamaesiphon
- Species: C. confervicola

Binomial name
- Chamaesiphon confervicola A.Braun, 1864

Synonyms
- Brachythrix confervicola A.Braun, 1865; Chamaesiphon schiedermayeri Grunow, 1865; Chamaesiphon curvatus Nordstedt, 1878; Chamaesiphon torulosus Borzì, 1882; Chamaesiphon confervicola var. curvata Borzì ex Hansgirg, 1883; Chamaesiphon confervicola var. schiedermayeri (Grunow) Borzì & Hansgirg, 1892

Species of freshwater bacteria

Chamaesiphon confervicola is a species of freshwater cyanobacterium found in North America and Europe. The species measures 50 micrometers long and 10 micrometers wide.
