= Jaaginema =

Scientific classification
- Domain: Bacteria
- Kingdom: Bacillati
- Phylum: Cyanobacteriota
- Class: Cyanophyceae
- Order: Pseudanabaenales
- Family: Pseudanabaenaceae
- Genus: Jaaginema; Anagnostidis & Komárek, 1988

Genus of bacteria

Jaaginema is a genus of cyanobacteria belonging to the family Leptolyngbyaceae.

The genus has cosmopolitan distribution.

Species:

- Jaaginema angustissimum (West & G.S.West) Anagn. & Komárek
- Jaaginema geminatum (Schwabe ex Gomont) Anagn. & Komárek
- Jaaginema minimum (Gickelh.) Anagn. & Komárek
- Jaaginema neglectum (Lemmerm.) Anagn. & Komárek
- Jaaginema perfilievii (Anissimova) Anagn. & Komárek, 1988
- Jaaginema pseudogeminatum (G.Schmid) Anagn. & Komárek
- Jaaginema quadripunctulatum (Brühl & Biswas) Anagn. & Komárek
- Jaaginema subtilissimum (Kütz. ex Forti) Anagn. & Komárek
- Jaaginema woronichinii (Anissimova) Anagn. & Komárek
