= Heteroleibleiniaceae =

Scientific classification
- Domain: Bacteria
- Phylum: Cyanobacteria
- Class: Cyanophyceae
- Order: Synechococcales
- Family: Heteroleibleiniaceae; Komárek et al. 2014

Genera
- Heteroleibleinia (Geitler) Hoffmann 1985; Tapinothrix Sauvageau 1892

Family of bacteria

The Heteroleibleiniaceae are a family of cyanobacteria.
