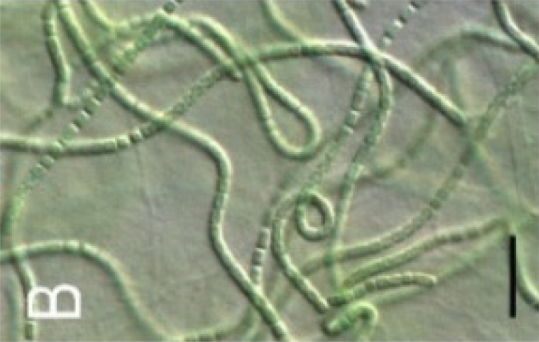
- Leptolyngbya sp.

Scientific classification
- Domain: Bacteria
- Phylum: Cyanobacteria
- Class: Cyanophyceae
- Order: Synechococcales
- Family: Leptolyngbyaceae
- Genus: Leptolyngbya; Anagnostidis & Komárek, 1988

= Leptolyngbya =

Genus of cyanobacteria

Leptolyngbya is a genus of cyanobacteria in the family Leptolyngbyaceae. The genus has a cosmopolitan distribution.

== Distribution and habitat ==
Leptolyngbya sp. are present in a wide range of habitats, including freshwater, marine, and terrestrial locations, as well as extreme environments such as thermal springs.

== Human uses ==
A 2022 study first investigated PHB formation in Leptolyngbya sp. NIVA-CYA 255, isolated from Egyptian soil. For this purpose, a three-stage cultivation process was carried out, consisting of an initial biomass growth phase and a two-stage product formation phase.PHB was isolated from Leptolyngbya valderiana and characterized by FTIR.

Due to the high carbon storage capacity and poly(3-hydroxybutyrate) (PHB) formation, Leptolyngbya sp. NIVA-CYA 255 is a promising candidate for PHB production. Further studies have demonstrated that Leptolyngbya possesses a balanced ratio of intracellular composition and high lipid content, and is therefore a suitable host for potential large-scale applications . Little is known about the storage lipid composition in Leptolyngbya species. Future work will focus on upscaling to a technical scale and monitoring the formation by LipidGreen2-based fluorometry.

== Species ==
The following species are recognised in the genus Leptolyngbya:

- Leptolyngbya angusta (Skuja) Anagn.
- Leptolyngbya angustissima (West & G.S.West) Anagn. & Komárek
- Leptolyngbya benthonica (Skuja) Anagn.
- Leptolyngbya boryana (Gomont) Anagnostidis & Komárek
- Leptolyngbya calotrichoides (Gomont) Anagn. & Komárek
- Leptolyngbya carnea (Kütz. ex Lemmerm.) Anagn. & Komárek
- Leptolyngbya cebennensis (Gomont) Umezaki & Watanabe
- Leptolyngbya crassior (Skuja) Anagn.
- Leptolyngbya crosbyana (Tilden) Anagn. & Komárek
- Leptolyngbya distincta (Nordstedt) Anagnostidis & Komarek
- Leptolyngbya ectocarpi (Gomont) Anagn. & Komárek
- Leptolyngbya foveolara (Gomont) Anagn. & Komárek
- Leptolyngbya fragilis (Gomont) Anagn. & Komárek
- Leptolyngbya frigida (F.E.Fritsch) Anagn. & Komárek
- Leptolyngbya gracilis (A.Lindst.) Anagn. & Komárek
- Leptolyngbya hendersonii (Howe) Anagnostidis & Komárek, 1988
- Leptolyngbya jadertina (Kützing ex Hansgirg) Anagnostidis, 2001
- Leptolyngbya lagerheimii (Gomont ex Gomont) Anagn. & Komárek
- Leptolyngbya laminosua (Gomont) Anagnostidis & Komárek, 1988
- Leptolyngbya marina (Gardner) Anagn.
- Leptolyngbya membraniporae (Lindst.) Anagn. & Komárek
- Leptolyngbya minuta (A.Lindst.) Anagn. & Komárek
- Leptolyngbya norvegia (Gomont) Anagnostidis & Komárek, 1988
- Leptolyngbya norvegica (Gomont) Anagn. & Komárek
- Leptolyngbya nostocorum (Bornet ex Gomont) Anagn. & Komárek
- Leptolyngbya notata (Schmidle) Anagn. & Komárek
- Leptolyngbya perelegans (Lemmerm.) Anagn. & Komárek
- Leptolyngbya perforans (Geitler) Anagn. & Komárek
- Leptolyngbya protospira (Skuja) Anagn.
- Leptolyngbya rivulariarum (Gomont) Anagn. & Komárek
- Leptolyngbya subtilis (West) Anagn.
- Leptolyngbya subtilissima Hansigirg, 1890
- Leptolyngbya subuliformis (Gomont) Anagn.
- Leptolyngbya tenuis (Gomont) Anagn. & Komárek
- Leptolyngbya terebrans (Bornet & Flahault ex Gomont) Anagn. & Komárek
- Leptolyngbya valderiana (Gomont) Anagn. & Komárek
- Leptolyngbya vandenberghenii (Symoens) Anagn.
- Leptolyngbya vorochiniana Anagnostidis & Komárek, 1988
