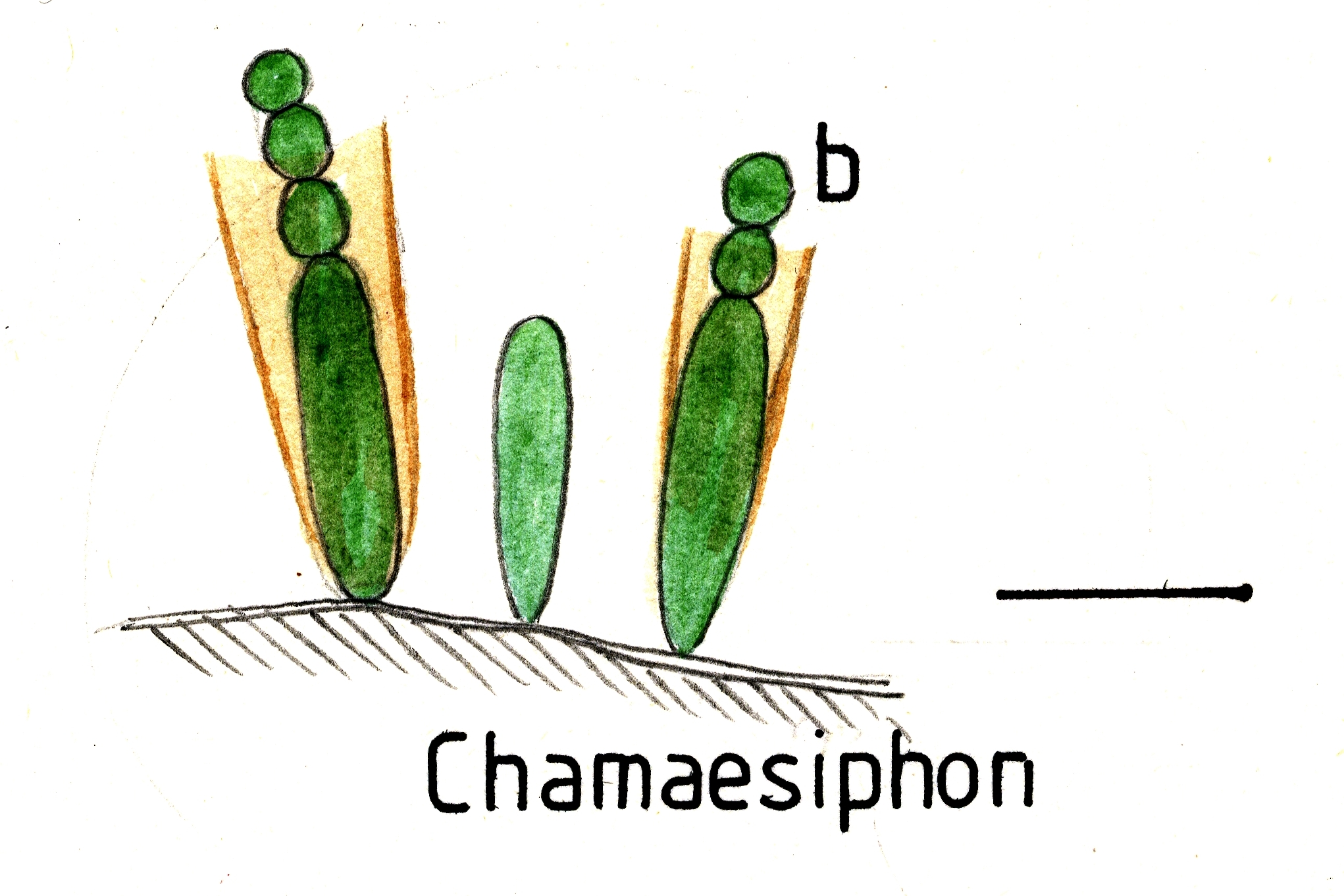
- Chamaesiphon b — internal spores (baeocytes); Scale bar ~10 µm

Scientific classification
- Domain: Bacteria
- Phylum: Cyanobacteria
- Class: Cyanophyceae
- Order: Synechococcales
- Family: Chamaesiphonaceae
- Genus: Chamaesiphon; A.Braun, 1864

= Chamaesiphon =

Genus of bacteria

Chamaesiphon is a genus of cyanobacteria belonging to the family Chamaesiphonaceae.

The genus has cosmopolitan distribution.

Species:

- Chamaesiphon amethystinus (Rostaf.) Lemmerm.
- Chamaesiphon britannicus (F.E.Fritsch) Komárek & Anagn.
- Chamaesiphon confervicola A.Braun
