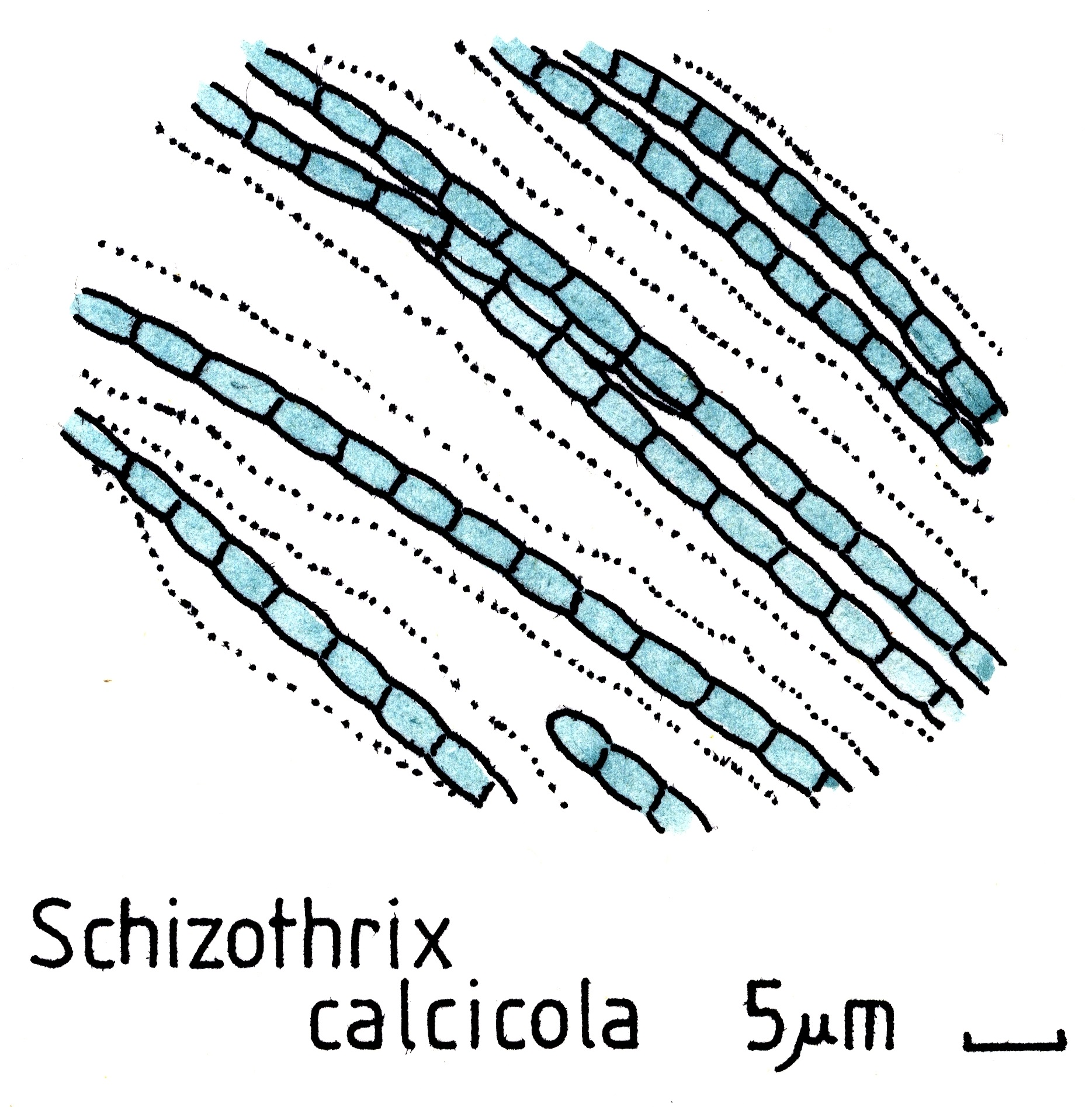
- Schizothrix calcicola

Scientific classification
- Domain: Bacteria
- Phylum: Cyanobacteria
- Class: Cyanophyceae
- Order: Synechococcales
- Family: Schizotrichaceae; Elenkin

Genera
- Dasygloea Thwaites ex Gomont 1892; Schizothrix Kützing ex Gomont 1892

= Schizotrichaceae =

Family of bacteria

The Schizotrichaceae are a family of cyanobacteria.
