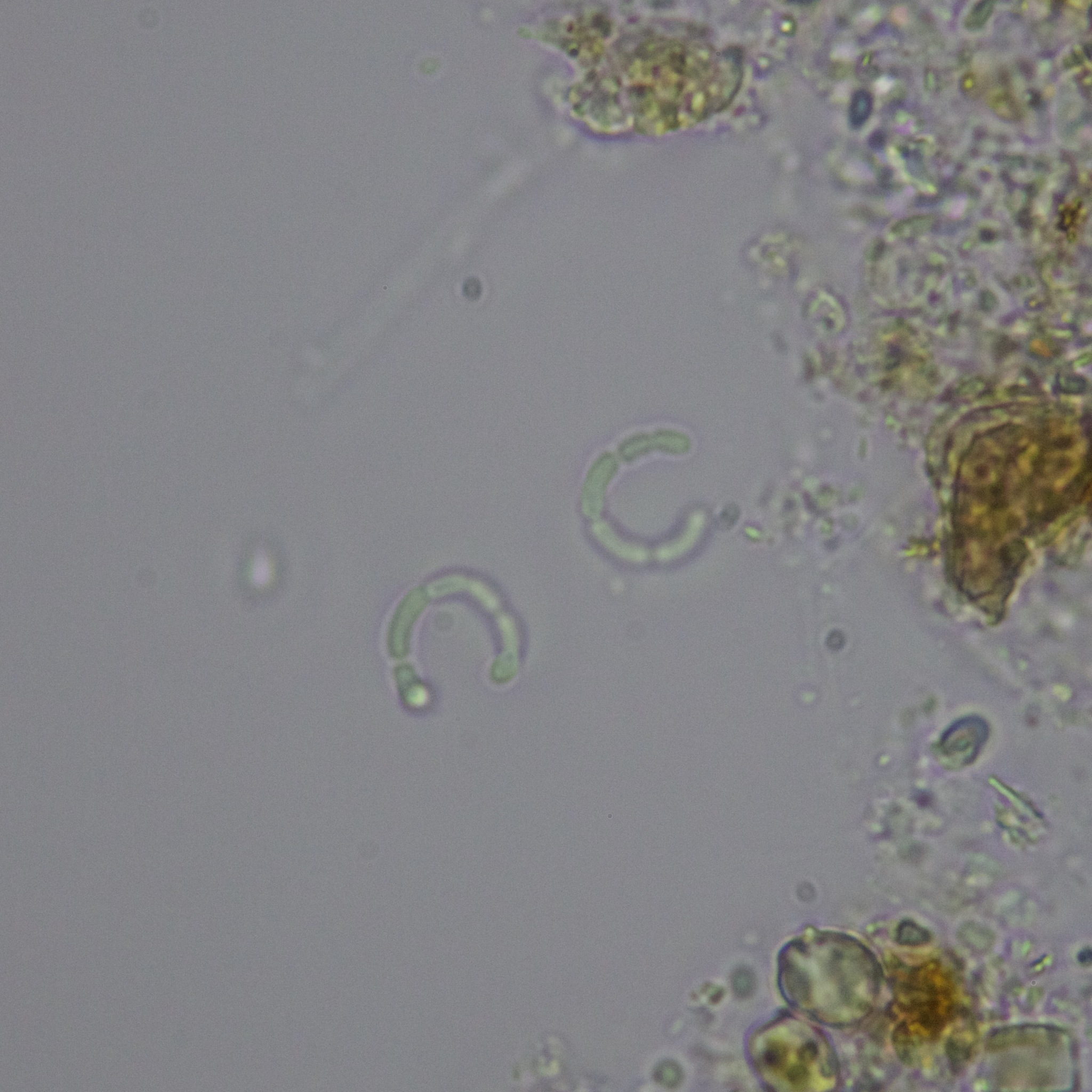
- Romeria elegans

Scientific classification
- Domain: Bacteria
- Phylum: Cyanobacteria
- Class: Cyanophyceae
- Order: Synechococcales
- Family: Romeriaceae; Komárek et al. 2014

Genera
- Cyanocatenula Joosten 2006; Romeria Koczwara in Geitler 1932; Tubiella Hollerbach 1935; Wolskyella Claus 1963

= Romeriaceae =

Family of bacteria

The Romeriaceae are a family of cyanobacteria.
