= Limnothrix =

Scientific classification
- Domain: Bacteria
- Kingdom: Bacillati
- Phylum: Cyanobacteriota
- Class: Cyanophyceae
- Order: Pseudanabaenales
- Family: Pseudanabaenaceae
- Genus: Limnothrix; M.-E.Meffert, 1988

Genus of bacteria

Limnothrix is a genus of cyanobacteria belonging to the family Pseudanabaenaceae.

There are no available genomes for any accepted species of Limnothrix as of 2023. The 16S ribosomal DNA sequences find Limnothrix polyphyletic with regard to Pseudanabaena.

As of Release 10-RS262 (April 2024), GTDB contains an error where it applies the name Limnothrix to a group more appropriately named Picosynechococcus. This error occurred due to a combination of the lack of genomes from true Limnothrix and the presence of a Limnothrix rosea more appropriately classified under Picosynechococcus.

== Species ==
Species:

- Limnothrix amphigranulata (Goor) Meffert
- Limnothrix bicudoi Azevedo & C.A. de Souza
- Limnothrix borgertii (Lemmermann) Anagnostidis
