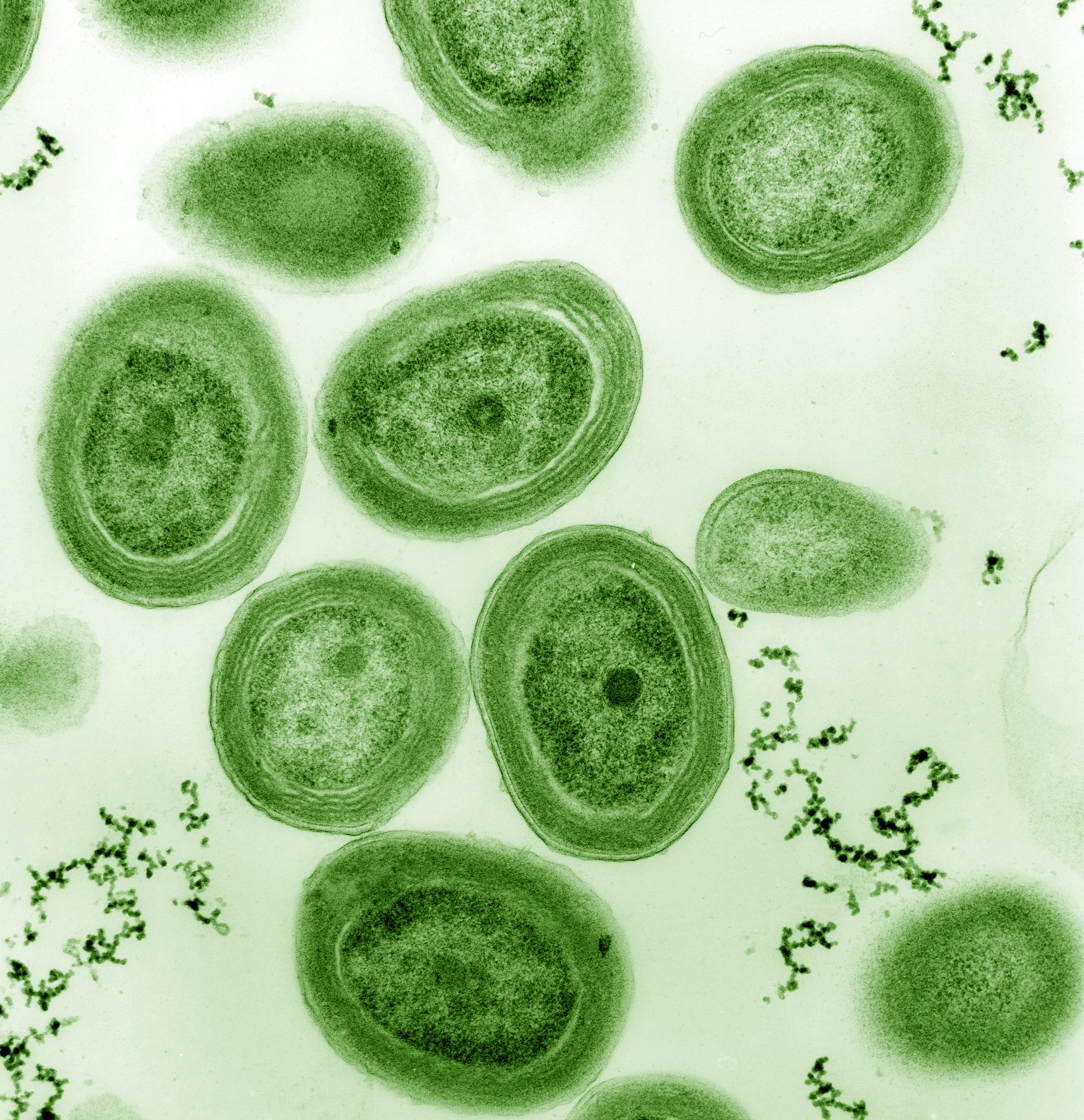
- TEM image of Prochlorococcus marinus (pseudo-colored)

Scientific classification
- Domain: Bacteria
- Kingdom: Bacillati
- Phylum: Cyanobacteriota
- Class: Cyanophyceae
- Order: Synechococcales
- Family: Prochloraceae
- Genus: Prochlorococcus; Chisholm et al., 1992
- Species: P. marinus

Binomial name
- Prochlorococcus marinus Chisholm et al., 1992

= Prochlorococcus =

Genus of bacteria

Prochlorococcus is a genus of very small (0.6 μm) marine cyanobacteria with an unusual pigmentation (chlorophyll a2 and b2). These bacteria belong to the photosynthetic picoplankton and are probably the most abundant photosynthetic organism on Earth. Prochlorococcus microbes are among the major primary producers in the ocean, responsible for a large percentage of the photosynthetic production of oxygen. Prochlorococcus strains, called ecotypes, have physiological differences enabling them to exploit different ecological niches. Analysis of the genome sequences of Prochlorococcus strains show that 1,273 genes are common to all strains, and the average genome size is about 2,000 genes. In contrast, eukaryotic algae have over 10,000 genes.

The genus and the type species were made validly published names under the ICNP in 2001 with Validation list no. 79. They became valid under the ICNafp in 2020 with the description of Komárek et al.

== Discovery ==
Although there had been several earlier records of very small chlorophyll-b-containing cyanobacteria in the ocean, Prochlorococcus was discovered in 1986 by Sallie W. (Penny) Chisholm of the Massachusetts Institute of Technology, Robert J. Olson of the Woods Hole Oceanographic Institution, and other collaborators in the Sargasso Sea using flow cytometry. Chisholm was awarded the Crafoord Prize in 2019 for the discovery. The first culture of Prochlorococcus was isolated in the Sargasso Sea in 1988 (strain SS120) and shortly another strain was obtained from the Mediterranean Sea (strain MED). The name Prochlorococcus originated from the fact it was originally assumed that Prochlorococcus was related to Prochloron and other chlorophyll-b-containing bacteria, called prochlorophytes, but it is now known that prochlorophytes form several separate phylogenetic groups within the cyanobacteria subgroup of the bacteria domain. The only species within the genus described is Prochlorococcus marinus, although two subspecies have been named for low-light and high-light adapted niche variations.

== Morphology ==
Marine cyanobacteria are to date the smallest known photosynthetic organisms; Prochlorococcus is the smallest at just 0.5 to 0.7 micrometres in diameter. The coccoid shaped cells are non-motile and free-living. Their small size and large surface-area-to-volume ratio, gives them an advantage in nutrient-poor water. Still, it is assumed that Prochlorococcus have a very small nutrient requirement. Moreover, Prochlorococcus have adapted to use sulfolipids instead of phospholipids in their membranes to survive in phosphate deprived environments. This adaptation allows them to avoid competition with heterotrophs that are dependent on phosphate for survival. Typically, Prochlorococcus divide once a day in the subsurface layer or oligotrophic waters.

== Distribution ==
Prochlorococcus is abundant in the euphotic zone of the world's tropical oceans. It is possibly the most plentiful genus on Earth: a single millilitre of surface seawater may contain 100,000 cells or more. Worldwide, the average yearly abundance is (2.8 to 3.0)×10^{27} individuals (for comparison, that is approximately the number of atoms in a ton of gold). Prochlorococcus is ubiquitous between 40°N and 40°S and dominates in the oligotrophic (nutrient-poor) regions of the oceans. Prochlorococcus is mostly found in a temperature range of 10–33 °C and some strains can grow at depths with low light (<1% surface light). These strains are known as LL (low light) ecotypes, with strains that occupy shallower depths in the water column known as HL (high light) ecotypes. Furthermore, Prochlorococcus are more plentiful in the presence of heterotrophs that have catalase abilities. Prochlorococcus do not have mechanisms to degrade reactive oxygen species and rely on heterotrophs to protect them. The bacterium accounts for an estimated 13–48% of the global photosynthetic production of oxygen, and forms part of the base of the ocean food chain. According to a study published in 2025, the abundance of Prochlorococcus in tropical oceans could decline dramatically in the 21st century, with up to 51 percent of the population projected to disappear by 2100 under moderate and high warming scenarios, which could trigger a chain reaction in marine food webs.

== Pigments ==
Prochlorococcus is closely related to Synechococcus, another abundant photosynthetic cyanobacterium, which contains the light-harvesting antennae phycobilisomes. However, Prochlorococcus has evolved to use a unique light-harvesting complex, consisting predominantly of divinyl derivatives of chlorophyll a (Chl a2) and chlorophyll b (Chl b2) and lacking monovinyl chlorophylls and phycobilisomes. Prochlorococcus is the only known wild-type oxygenic phototroph that does not contain Chl a2 as a major photosynthetic pigment, and is the only known prokaryote with α-carotene.

== Genome ==
The genomes of several strains of Prochlorococcus have been sequenced. Twelve complete genomes have been sequenced which reveal physiologically and genetically distinct lineages of Prochlorococcus marinus that are 97% similar in the 16S rRNA gene. Research has shown that a massive genome reduction occurred during the Neoproterozoic Snowball Earth, which was followed by population bottlenecks.

The high-light ecotype has the smallest genome (1,657,990 basepairs, 1,716 genes) of any known oxygenic phototroph, but the genome of the low-light type is much larger (2,410,873 base pairs, 2,275 genes).

== DNA recombination, repair and replication ==
Marine Prochlorococcus cyanobacteria have several genes that function in DNA recombination, repair and replication. These include the recBCD gene complex whose product, exonuclease V, functions in recombinational repair of DNA, and the umuCD gene complex whose product, DNA polymerase V, functions in error-prone DNA replication. These cyanobacteria also have the gene lexA that regulates an SOS response system, probably a system like the well-studied E. coli SOS system that is employed in the response to DNA damage.

== Ecology ==
Ancestors of Prochlorococcus contributed to the production of early atmospheric oxygen. Despite Prochlorococcus being one of the smallest types of marine phytoplankton in the world's oceans, its substantial number make it responsible for a major part of the oceans', world's photosynthesis, and oxygen production. The size of Prochlorococcus (0.5 to 0.7 μm) and the adaptations of the various ecotypes allow the organism to grow abundantly in low nutrient waters such as the waters of the tropics and the subtropics (c. 40°N to 40°S); however, they can be found in higher latitudes as high up as 60° north but at fairly minimal concentrations and the bacteria's distribution across the oceans suggest that the colder waters could be fatal. This wide range of latitude along with the bacteria's ability to survive up to depths of 100 to 150 metres, i.e. the average depth of the mixing layer of the surface ocean, allows it to grow to enormous numbers, up to 3×10^{27} individuals worldwide. This enormous number makes the Prochlorococcus play an important role in the global carbon cycle and oxygen production. Along with Synechococcus (another genus of cyanobacteria that co-occurs with Prochlorococcus) these cyanobacteria are responsible for approximately 50% of marine carbon fixation, making it an important carbon sink via the biological carbon pump (i.e. the transfer of organic carbon from the surface ocean to the deep via several biological, physical and chemical processes). The abundance, distribution and all other characteristics of the Prochlorococcus make it a key organism in oligotrophic waters serving as an important primary producer to the open ocean food webs. However, its sensitivity to climate change remains unclear. Studies indicate a potential vulnerability of Prochlorococcus-dependent marine ecosystems and its role in carbon fixation.

== Ecotypes ==
Prochlorococcus has different "ecotypes" occupying different niches and can vary by pigments, light requirements, nitrogen and phosphorus utilization, copper, and virus sensitivity. It is thought that Prochlorococcus may occupy potentially 35 different ecotypes and sub-ecotypes within the worlds' oceans. They can be differentiated on the basis of the sequence of the ribosomal RNA gene. It has been broken down by NCBI Taxonomy into two different subspecies, low-light adapted (LL) or high-light adapted (HL). There are six clades within each subspecies.

=== Low-light adapted ===
Prochlorococcus marinus subsp. marinus is associated with low-light adapted types. It is also further classified by sub-ecotypes LLI-LLVII, where LLII/III has not been yet phylogenetically uncoupled. LV species are found in highly iron scarce locations around the equator, and as a result, have lost several ferric proteins. The low-light adapted subspecies is otherwise known to have a higher ratio of chlorophyll b2 to chlorophyll a2, which aids in its ability to absorb blue light. Blue light is able to penetrate ocean waters deeper than the rest of the visible spectrum, and can reach depths of >200 m, depending on the turbidity of the water. Their ability to photosynthesize at a depth where blue light penetrates allows them to inhabit depths between 80 and 200 m. Their genomes can range from 1,650,000 to 2,600,000 basepairs in size.

=== High-light adapted ===
Prochlorococcus marinus subsp. pastoris is associated with high-light adapted types. It can be further classified by sub-ecotypes HLI-HLVI. HLIII, like LV, is also located in an iron-limited environment near the equator, with similar ferric adaptations. The high-light adapted subspecies is otherwise known to have a low ratio of chlorophyll b2 to chlorophyll a2. High-light adapted strains inhabit depths between 25 and 100 m. Their genomes can range from 1,640,000 to 1,800,000 basepairs in size.

== Metabolism ==
Most cyanobacteria are known to have an incomplete tricarboxylic acid cycle (TCA). In this process, 2-oxoglutarate decarboxylase (2OGDC) and succinic semialdehyde dehydrogenase (SSADH), replace the enzyme 2-oxoglutarate dehydrogenase (2-OGDH). Normally, when this enzyme complex joins with NADP+, it can be converted to succinate from 2-oxoglutarate (2-OG). This pathway is non-functional in Prochlorococcus, as succinate dehydrogenase has been lost evolutionarily to conserve energy that may have otherwise been lost to phosphate metabolism.

== Strains ==
Strain	Subtype	Source
MIT9515	HLI	
EQPAC1	HLI	
MED4	HLI	
XMU1401	HLII	
MIT0604	HLII	
AS9601	HLII	
GP2	HLII	
MIT9107	HLII	
MIT9116	HLII	
MIT9123	HLII	
MIT9201	HLII	
MIT9202	HLII	
MIT9215	HLII	
MIT9301	HLII	
MIT9302	HLII	
MIT9311	HLII	
MIT9312	HLII	
MIT9314	HLII	
MIT9321	HLII	
MIT9322	HLII	
MIT9401	HLII	
SB	HLII	
XMU1403	LLI	
XMU1408	LLI	
MIT0801	LLI	
NATL1A	LLI	
NATL2A	LLI	
PAC1	LLI	
LG	LLII/III	
MIT0601	LLII/III	
MIT0602	LLII/III	
MIT0603	LLII/III	
MIT9211	LLII/III	
SS35	LLII/III	
SS52	LLII/III	
SS120	LLII/III	
SS2	LLII/III	
SS51	LLII/III	
MIT0701	LLIV	
MIT0702	LLIV	
MIT0703	LLIV	
MIT9303	LLIV	
MIT9313	LLIV	
MIT1303	LLIV	
MIT1306	LLIV	
MIT1312	LLIV	
MIT1313	LLIV	
MIT1318	LLIV	
MIT1320	LLIV	
MIT1323	LLIV	
MIT1327	LLIV	
MIT1342	LLIV	

Table modified from

== See also ==
- Photosynthetic picoplankton
- Pelagibacter
- Synechococcus
- Prochloron
- Prochlorothrix
