= Heteroleibleinia =

Scientific classification
- Domain: Bacteria
- Kingdom: Bacillati
- Phylum: Cyanobacteriota
- Class: Cyanophyceae
- Order: Pseudanabaenales
- Family: Pseudanabaenaceae
- Genus: Heteroleibleinia (Geitler) L.Hoffmann, 1905

Genus of bacteria

Heteroleibleinia is a genus of algae belonging to the family Leptolyngbyaceae.

The genus has almost cosmopolitan distribution.

Species:

- Heteroleibleinia epiphytica Komárek, 2001
- Heteroleibleinia erecta (N.L.Gardner) Anagnostidis, 2001
- Heteroleibleinia gardneri (Geitler) Anagnostidis & Komárek, 1988
- Heteroleibleinia infixa (Frémy) Anagn. & Komárek
- Heteroleibleinia kuetzingii (Schmidle) Compère
- Heteroleibleinia kützingii (Schmidle) Compére, 1985
- Heteroleibleinia leptonema (Skuja) Anagn. & Komárek
- Heteroleibleinia rigidula (Kütz. ex Hansg.) L.Hoffm.
