= Kuroshio Current Intrusion =

Movement of water from the Pacific to the West Philippine/South China Sea

The Kuroshio Current is a northward flowing Western Boundary Current (WBC) in the Pacific Ocean. It is a bifurcation arm of the North Equatorial Current and consists of northwestern Pacific Ocean water. The other arm is the southward flowing Mindanao Current. The Kuroshio Current flows along the eastern Philippine coast, up to 13.7 Sv... of it leaking into the Luzon Strait - the gap between the Philippines and Taiwan - before continuing along the Japanese coast. Some of the leaked water manages to intrude into the South China Sea (SCS). This affects the heat and salt budgets and circulation and eddy generation mechanisms in the SCS. There are various theories about possible intrusion paths and what mechanisms initiate them.

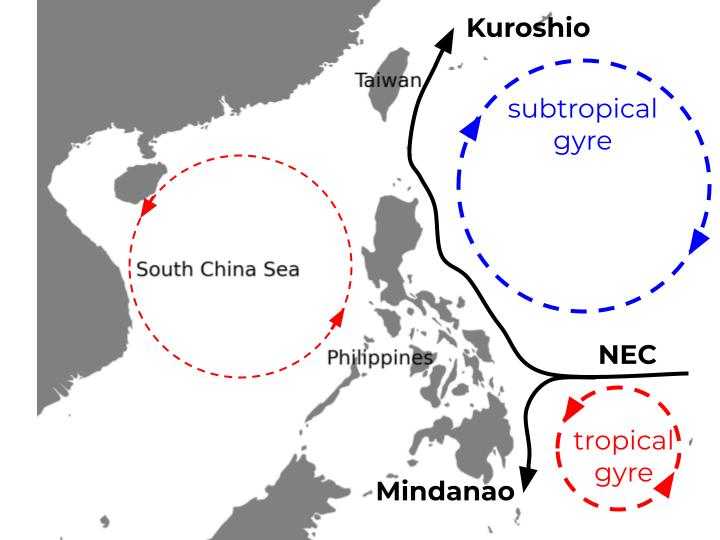
Bifurcation of the North Equatorial Current (NEC) into the Kuroshio and Mindanao currents. The anticyclonic gyre in the South China Sea is weaker than the (sub)tropical gyres.

== Intrusion paths ==
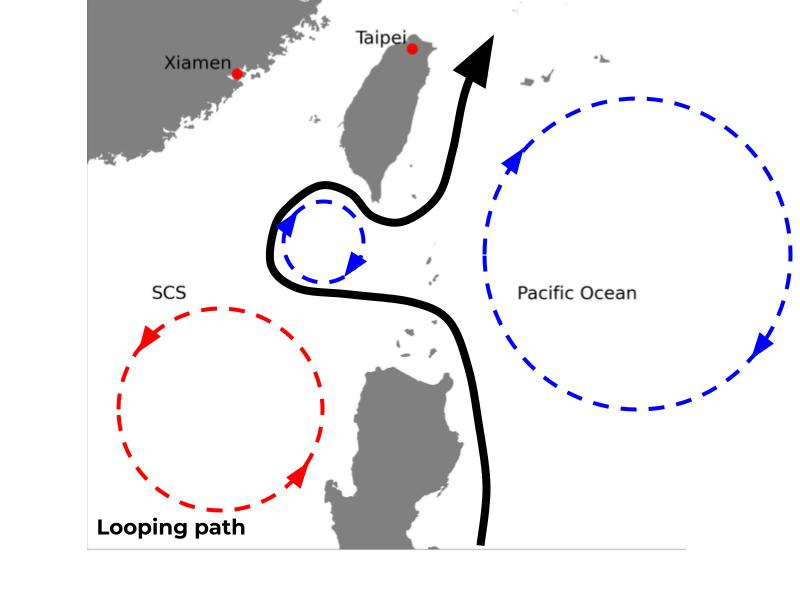
Looping path intrusion of Kuroshio water into the South China Sea (SCS). The Kuroshio flow is modified so that it forms a cyclonic gyre in the Luzon Strait from which eddies can shed and penetrate farther into the South China Sea (SCS).

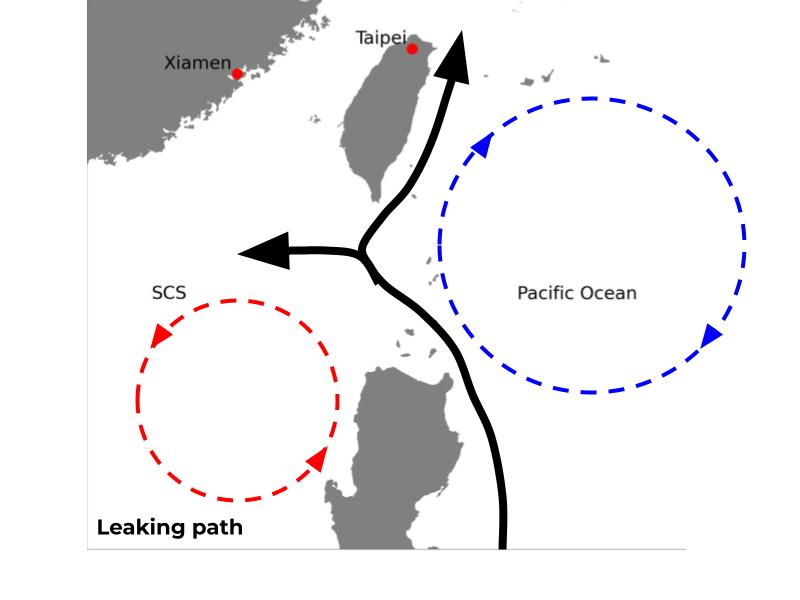
Leaking path intrusion of Kuroshio water into the South China Sea (SCS). Some water detaches from the Kuroshio flow and penetrates the Luzon Strait to reach the SCS.

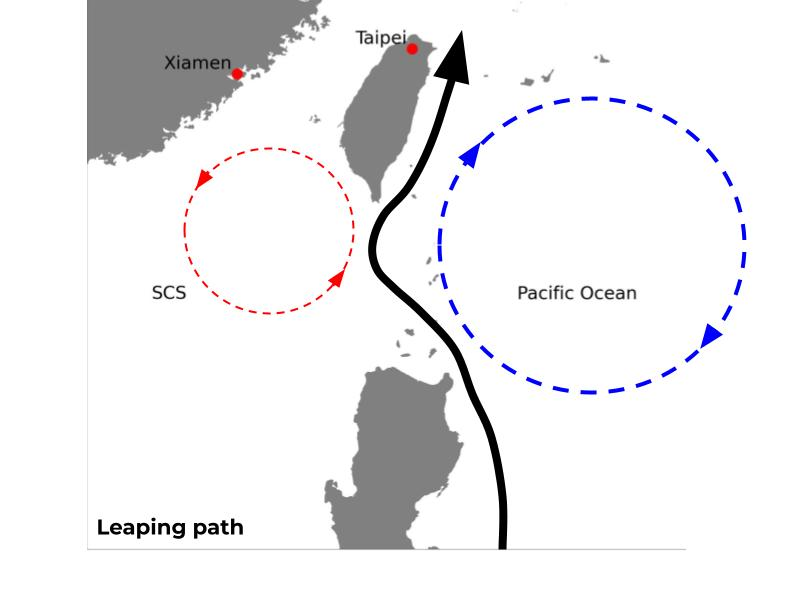
Leaping path intrusion of Kuroshio water into the South China Sea. The anticyclonic gyre is significantly weaker as a result of the intrusion.

From satellite data, Nan, et al. (2011) concluded there are three intrusion paths for the Kuroshio Current into the SCS.

A northward flowing WBC (like the Kuroshio Current) can deform at a gap in a western boundary and form an anticyclonic current loop if the gap is wide enough. This results in a looping path, where water from the Kuroshio flows through the middle of the Luzon Strait into the SCS and out in the north of the strait. The current loop in the SCS forms due to Ekman transport resulting from northeasterly winds that push Kuroshio surface water westward. Anticyclonic eddies can shed from the current loop and penetrate farther into the SCS, as has been observed by Li (1997)

During the winter monsoon season, Kuroshio intrusion strengthens. Winds blow in the northwestward direction, thereby pushing Kuroshio surface water into the Luzon Strait. This can result in an anticyclonic bending of the Kuroshio flow into the Luzon Strait, from which a branch detaches into the SCS. A cyclonic gyre forms northwestward of the Luzon Strait as a result of this leaking path. This theory is based on observations by D.Z. Qiu, et al. (1984) from floaters but more recently no such branch has been observed

The Kuroshio can also take a leaping path across the Luzon Strait and into the SCS. This is seen as a strengthening of the Luzon Cyclonic Gyre to the west of the strait while the Kuroshio continues northwards along the eastern Taiwanese coast. The anticyclonic gyre normally present in the SCS is significantly weakened as a result.

== Intrusion mechanisms ==
=== Wind forcing ===
The Luzon Strait and SCS experience seasonally reversing monsoon winds; these are southwestward and stronger in the boreal winter and northeastward and weaker in the boreal summer. This results in negative wind-driven Ekman transport in the winter, strengthening Kuroshio intrusion, and positive transport in the boreal summer, weakening intrusion. Wind-driven Ekman transport could therefore contribute to westward flow through the Luzon Strait and hence to Kuroshio leakage into the SCS. However, research has shown that less than 10% of Luzon Strait transport is due to purely wind-driven Ekman flow. Nevertheless, wind-driven Ekman drift still influences the inflow angle and speed of Kuroshio intrusion

=== Inter-basin pressure gradient ===
A build up of water has been observed on the Pacific side of the Luzon Strait by Y. T. Song (2006), which results in a pressure gradient across the strait. This could initiate the bending of the Kuroshio Current into the Luzon Strait, thereby resulting in eventual leakage.

Satellite data show a decreasing trend in Kuroshio intrusion strength over time, which correlates with a decrease in the cross-Luzon Strait pressure gradient, thereby supporting this theory. However, the exact mechanism for a pressure gradient-induced intrusion is not yet fully understood.

The proposed equation describing the transport $Q$ between the SCS and the Pacific Ocean basins is based on a two-layer ocean model.

$$Q =
\begin{cases}
\frac{g}{f}H_1\Delta\eta+\frac{H_2}{2f}g'\Delta h, & \text{if }R<W_0 \\
\frac{g}{f}H_1\Delta\eta+\kappa\left(\frac{2}{3}\right)^{3/2}H_2W_0\sqrt{g'\Delta h}, & \text{otherwise}
\end{cases}$$

It depends on the surface and bottom layer depths $H_1$ and $H_2$ respectively, the sea surface height difference between the two basins $\Delta\eta$ and the height difference of the layer interface between the two basins $\Delta h$. The Rossby radius of deformation $R=\frac{\sqrt{2g'\Delta h}}{f}$ uses the reduced gravity $g'=\frac{g \Delta\rho}{\rho_0}$, $\kappa=\pm(\Delta p_b-\Delta\eta)$ determines the direction of the pressure gradient and $W_0$ is the strait width.

According to this mechanism, $H_1\Delta\eta$ describes the transport in the upper layer of the Luzon Strait, which is dominated by geostrophic balance. This model has a few drawbacks: it only divides the ocean into two layers which reduces accuracy, and the model outcome depends strongly on the delineation of the SCS and Pacific Ocean basins....

=== Beta effect and hysteresis ===
The beta effect describes the changing of the Coriolis parameter $f$ with latitude. This effect will cause a WBC like the Kuroshio current to intrude into a meridional gap. The intrusion can then either penetrate the gap, or leap over it continuing its flow on the other side. Which flow path occurs depends on the ratio of flow inertia (which encourages leaping) to beta effect (which encourages penetrating). There can also be a transition between flow states as this ratio changes. Two different flow states can arise from the same external forcings depending on the past flow state; there is hysteresis in the system

=== Potential vorticity conservation ===
Research by Nan et al. (2011) suggests that during Kuroshio intrusion into the SCS, potential vorticity must be conserved across the Luzon Strait. This means that intrusion must be in the form of current loops or rings that rotate either cyclonically or anticyclonically depending on the potential vorticity balance. The equation describing this motion is for a frictionless beta plane in a steady state with reduced gravity.

$\frac{d\theta}{dy}\sin{\theta}=-\frac{\beta}{\nu_c}+\frac{\nu_{c0}}{\nu_c}\frac{d\theta}{dy}\bigg|_{y=0}\sin{\theta_0}$

Here, $\nu_c$ is the flow speed at the current core and $\theta$ is the angle between the velocity vector and the positive $x$-axis. Notice that the model is dependent on the inflow speed $\nu_{c0}$ and angle $\theta_0$. However, this theory is based on the assumption of a steady state, which is not realistic since the Kuroshio intrusion process is unstable.

=== Eddy activity ===
There are many eddies near the Luzon-Taiwan coast, especially to the east of the Kuroshio axis. Most eddies propagate westward with a mean speed of 7.2 cm/s and are deflected due to the Kuroshio current. This could be a source of Kuroshio intrusion into the SCS. However, few eddies from the Pacific can propagate into the Luzon Strait, since it is blocked by the Kuroshio current. Mesoscale eddies can impact the strength of the Kuroshio and its inflow angle at the Luzon Strait by changing the local background flow. Furthermore, seasonal variations in eddy strength and frequency correlate with seasonal variations in Kuroshio intrusion and Luzon Strait transport, suggesting that the two could nevertheless be linked.

== Impacts of Kuroshio Intrusion ==
The water intruding into the northern SCS from the Kuroshio current is relatively nutrient-rich. Therefore it enriches dissolved organic matter stores and enhances ammonia oxidation in the SCS. Bacteria and phytoplankton use these resources to grow and support their biogeochemical activities. Microzooplankton are particularly affected by the influx of nutrients since they have limited transport mechanisms compared to zooplankton

Kuroshio current intrusion has oxidized and increased the salinity of the sedimentary environment northwest of Luzon Island in the SCS. The intrusion transports sediment high in illite and chlorite concentrations from around Taiwan southwestward into the deep sea environment. Pearl river sediment, high in concentrations of kaolinite and titanium, are also transported southwestward by the intrusion
