= Sallie W. Chisholm =

American oceanographer, marine biologist

Sallie Watson Chisholm
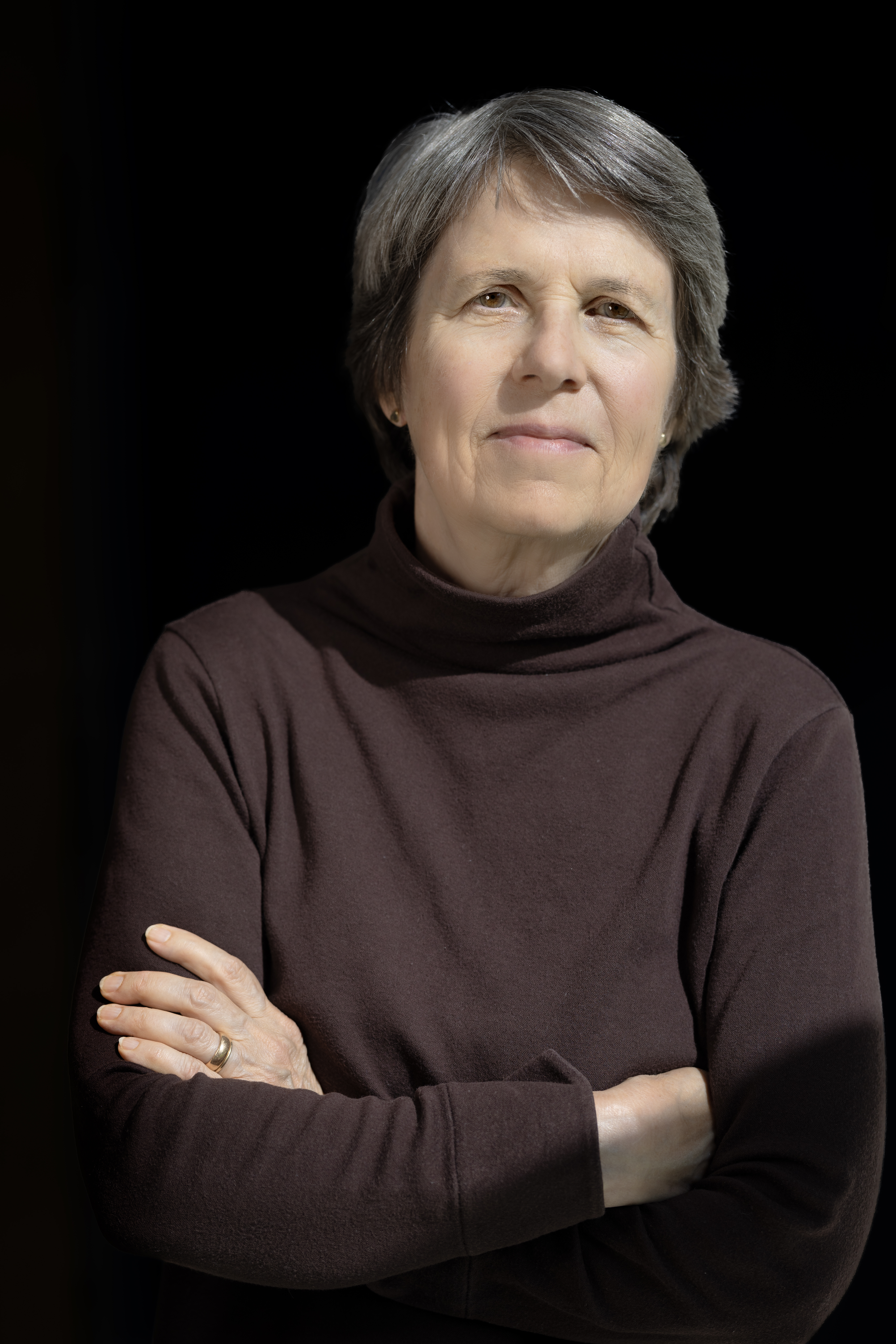
- Born: 1947 (age 78–79); Marquette, Michigan, U.S.
- Education: Skidmore College; University at Albany, SUNY
- Known for: Study of phytoplankton, especially Prochlorococcus
- Awards: National Medal of Science; Alexander Agassiz Medal (2010); Crafoord Prize (2019)
- Scientific career
- Fields: Marine biology
- Workplaces: Massachusetts Institute of Technology

Sallie Watson "Penny" Chisholm (born 1947) is an American biological oceanographer at the Massachusetts Institute of Technology. She is an expert in the ecology and evolution of ocean microbes. Her research focuses particularly on the most abundant marine phytoplankton, Prochlorococcus, that she discovered in the 1980s with Rob Olson and other collaborators. She has a TED talk about their discovery and importance called "The tiny creature that secretly powers the planet".

== Early life and education ==
Chisholm discussing her research and childhood.

Chisholm was born in Marquette, Michigan and graduated from Marquette Senior High School in 1965. She attended Skidmore College and earned a PhD from SUNY Albany in 1974. Following her Ph.D., she served as a post-doctoral researcher at the Scripps Institution of Oceanography from 1974 to 1976.

== Career ==
Chisholm has been a faculty member at the Massachusetts Institute of Technology since 1976, was appointed as an Institute Professor in 2015, and has been a visiting scientist at the Woods Hole Oceanographic Institution since 1978. Her research has focused on the ecology of marine phytoplankton. Chisholm's early work focused on the processes by which such plankton take up nutrients and the manner in which this affects their life cycle on diurnal time scales. This led her to begin using flow cytometry which can be used to measure the properties of individual cells.

The application of flow cytometry to environmental samples led Chisholm and her collaborators (most notably Rob Olson and Heidi Sosik) to the discovery that small plankton (in particular Prochlorococcus and Synechococcus) accounted for a much more substantial part of marine productivity than had previously been realized. Previously, biological oceanographers had focused on silicaceous diatoms as being the most important phytoplankton, accounting for 10–20 gigatons of carbon uptake each year. Chisholm's work showed that an even larger amount of carbon was cycled through these small algae, which may also play an important role in the global nitrogen cycle.

In recent years, Chisholm has played a visible role in opposing the use of iron fertilization as a technological fix for anthropogenic climate change.

In 1994, Chisholm was one of 16 women faculty in the School of Science at MIT who drafted and co-signed a letter to the then-Dean of Science (now Chancellor of Berkeley) Robert Birgeneau, which started a campaign to highlight and challenge gender discrimination at MIT.

== Awards and honors ==
Chisholm has been a member of the United States National Academy of Sciences (NAS) since 2003 and a fellow of the American Academy of Arts and Sciences since 1992.

In January 2010, she was awarded the Alexander Agassiz Medal, for "pioneering studies of the dominant photosynthetic organisms in the sea and for integrating her results into a new understanding of the global ocean."

She was a co-recipient in 2012 of the Ruth Patrick Award from the Association for the Sciences of Limnology and Oceanography. In the same year, she became one of the inaugural Fellows of the Ecological Society of America.

Chisholm received the National Medal of Science from President Barack Obama on February 1, 2013.

In 2013, she was awarded the Ramon Margalef Prize in Ecology, "for being one of the most productive, charismatic and active researchers on biology and marine ecology".

On May 24, 2018, she was awarded the Doctor of Science degree by Harvard University.

In 2019 she received the Crafoord Prize in Biosciences, "for the discovery and pioneering studies of the most abundant photosynthesising organism on Earth, Prochlorococcus". This prize is considered equivalent to the Nobel Prize (for which there is no Biosciences category). Chisholm was honored at the Crafoord Prize Symposium in Biosciences at which 6 internationally prominent scientists spoke (in order of presentations): Alexandra Worden (then at the GEOMAR Helmholtz Centre for Ocean Research Kiel, Germany), Corina Brussaard (NIOZ Royal Netherlands Institute for Sea Research, The Netherlands), Ramunas Stepanauskas (Bigelow Laboratory for Ocean Sciences, US), Rachel Foster (Stockholm University, Sweden), Francis M. Martin (INRA French National Institute for Agricultural Research, France) and David Karl (University of Hawaii, US).

== Select works ==
- Bang, Molly; Chisholm, Penny (2012). Ocean Sunlight. Blue Sky Press (AZ). ISBN 978-0-545-27322-0.
- Chisholm, Sallie W. (January 1, 2012). "Unveiling Prochlorococcus" (PDF). Microbes and Evolution. American Society of Microbiology. pp. 165–171. doi:10.1128/9781555818470.ch23. hdl:1721.1/69963. ISBN 978-1-55581-540-0.
- Coleman, M. L.; Chisholm, S. W. (2010). "Ecosystem-specific selection pressures revealed by comparative population genomics". PNAS. 107 (43): 18634–18639. doi:10.1073/pnas.1009480107. PMC 2972931. PMID 20937887.
- Lindell, D.; Jaffe, J.D.; Coleman, M.L.; Axmann, I.M.; Rector, T.; Kettler, G.; Sullivan, M.B.; Steen, R.; Hess, W.R.; Church, G.M.; Chisholm, S. W. (2007). "Genome-wide expression dynamics of a marine virus and host reveal features of coevolution". Nature. 449 (7158): 83–86. Bibcode:2007Natur.449...83L. doi:10.1038/nature06130. PMID 17805294. S2CID 4412265.
- Chisholm, Sallie W.; Falkowski, Paul G.; Cullen, John J. (October 12, 2001). "Dis-Crediting Ocean Fertilization". Science. 294 (5541). American Association for the Advancement of Science (AAAS): 309–310. doi:10.1126/science.1065349. ISSN 0036-8075. PMID 11598285. S2CID 130687109.
- Chisholm, S.W.; Olson, R.J.; Zettler, E.R.; Goericke, R.; Waterbury, J.; Welschmeyer, N. (1988). "A novel free-living prochlorophyte abundant in the oceanic euphotic zone". Nature. 334 (6180): 340–343. Bibcode:1988Natur.334..340C. doi:10.1038/334340a0. S2CID 4373102.

== See also ==
- Prochlorococcus
- Synechococcus
- Carbon cycle
- Global warming
