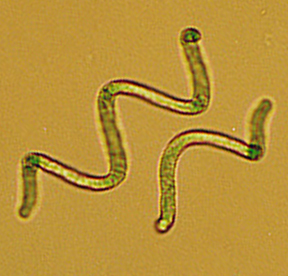
- Spirul2

Scientific classification
- Domain: Bacteria
- Kingdom: Bacillati
- Phylum: Cyanobacteriota
- Class: Cyanophyceae
- Order: Pseudanabaenales
- Family: Pseudanabaenaceae; Anagnostidis & Komárek 1988

= Pseudanabaenaceae =

Family of bacteria

The Pseudanabaenaceae are a family of cyanobacteria. The order Pseudanabaenales consists of this family and Thalassoporaceae (Thalassoporum).

== Genera ==
=== 2020s taxonomy ===
The taxonomy as accepted by AlgaeBase and LPSN is based on Strunecký, Otakar, and Mareš (2023). This work includes two genera in the family, Limnothrix and Pseudanabaena. Because Limnothrix is polyphyletic with regard to Pseudanabaena, the two are likely to become one in the future.

=== Old taxonomy ===
As accepted by WoRMS;

No subfamily

- Arthronema Komárek & Lukavský 1988
- Halomicronema Abed, Garcia-Pichel & Hernández-Mariné, 2002
- Spirocoleus Möbius, 1889

Subfamily Heteroleibleinioideae

- Persinema F.Heidari & T.Hauer, 2018

Subfamily Pseudanabaenoideae

- Calenema Ramos, Brito & Kaštovský, 2017
- Heteroleibleinia (Geitler) L.Hoffmann, 1905
- Jaaginema Anagnostidis & Komárek 1988
- Limnothrix Meffert 1988
- Plectolyngbya Taton, Wilmotte, Smarda, Elster & Komárek, 2011
- Prochlorothrix Burger-Wiersma et al. 1989
- Pseudanabaena Lauterborn 1915
- Romeria Koczwara, 1932
- Sokolovia Elenkin, 1926
- Tapinothrix Sauvageau, 1892

Subfamily Spirulinoideae

- Toxifilum Zimba, Huang, Foley & Linton, 2017

Dubious

- Chamaenema Kützing, 1833 (uncertain > nomen dubium)
