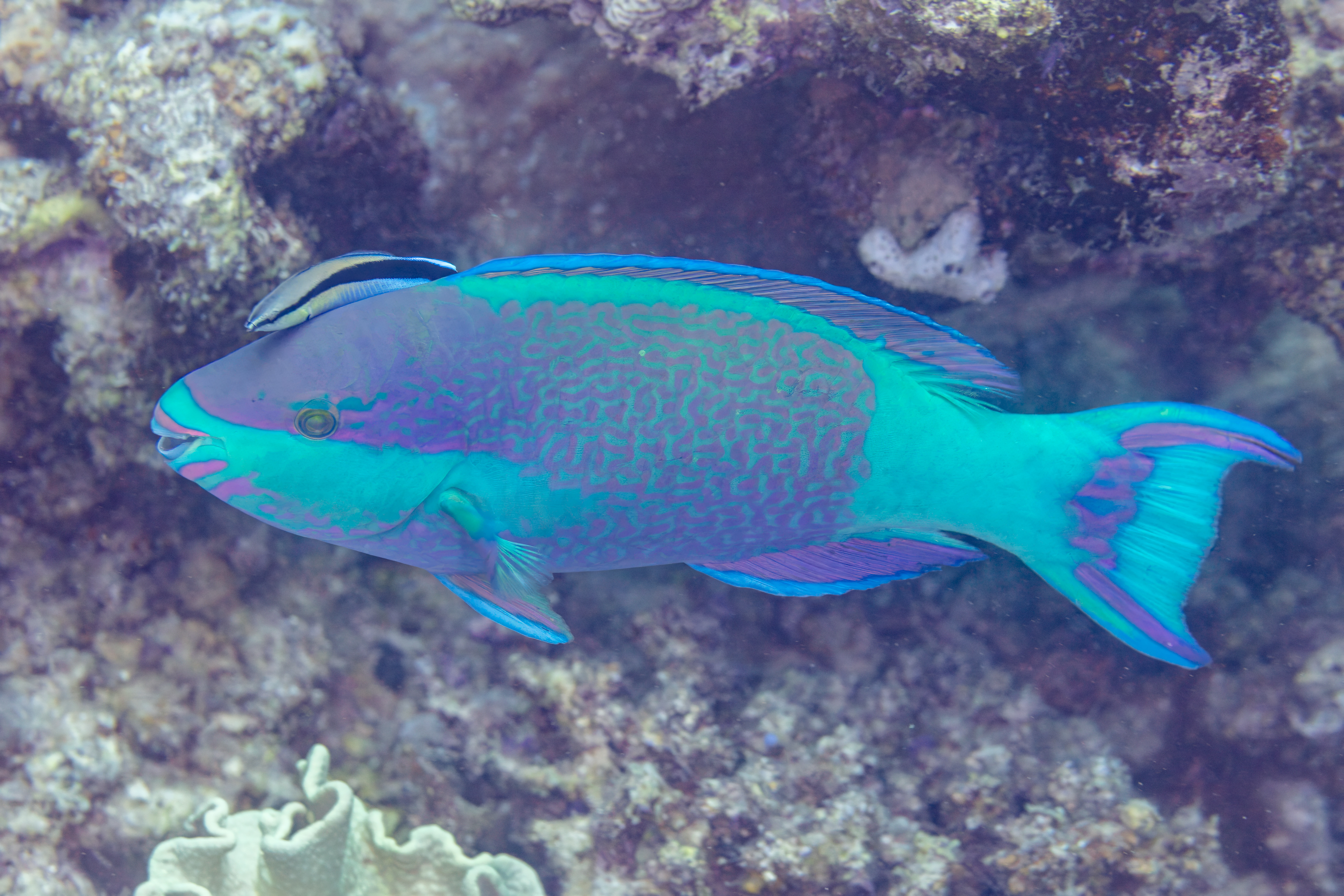
- Terminal phase, Red Sea
- Initial phase, in the Maldives

Conservation status
- Least Concern (IUCN 3.1)

Scientific classification
- Kingdom: Animalia
- Phylum: Chordata
- Class: Actinopterygii
- Division: Teleostei
- Order: Labriformes
- Family: Labridae
- Genus: Scarus
- Species: S. frenatus

Binomial name
- Scarus frenatus Lacépède, 1802

Synonyms
- List: Callyodon frenatus (Lacepède, 1802); Scarus sexvittatus Rüppell, 1835; Callyodon sexvittatus (Rüppell, 1835); Callyodon upolensis Jordan & Seale, 1906; Callyodon vermiculatus Fowler & Bean, 1928; Scarus vermiculatus (Fowler & Bean, 1928); Scarus randalli Schultz, 1958

= Scarus frenatus =

Species of fish

Scarus frenatus is a species of parrotfish. Common names include bridled parrotfish, sixband or six-banded parrotfish or vermiculate parrotfish.

== Distribution ==
Scarus frenatus is found in the Indo-Pacific region from the Red Sea to the Line Islands and Ducie Island, and as far north as southern Japan, to its southernmost location at Shark Bay in Western Australia, Lord Howe Island, and Rapa Iti in French Polynesia. It is not found in the waters of Hawaii.

== Description ==
This species grows to a maximum length of 47 cm. Its appearance changes during its life phases. During the initial phase, it has a reddish to brown colour, six to seven dark, horizontal stripes along its body, and red fins. In males, during the terminal phase, the posterior of the body and the lower half of the head appear abruptly lighter. Also, in males, the caudal fins appear blue-green with a large, orange, crescent-shaped area.

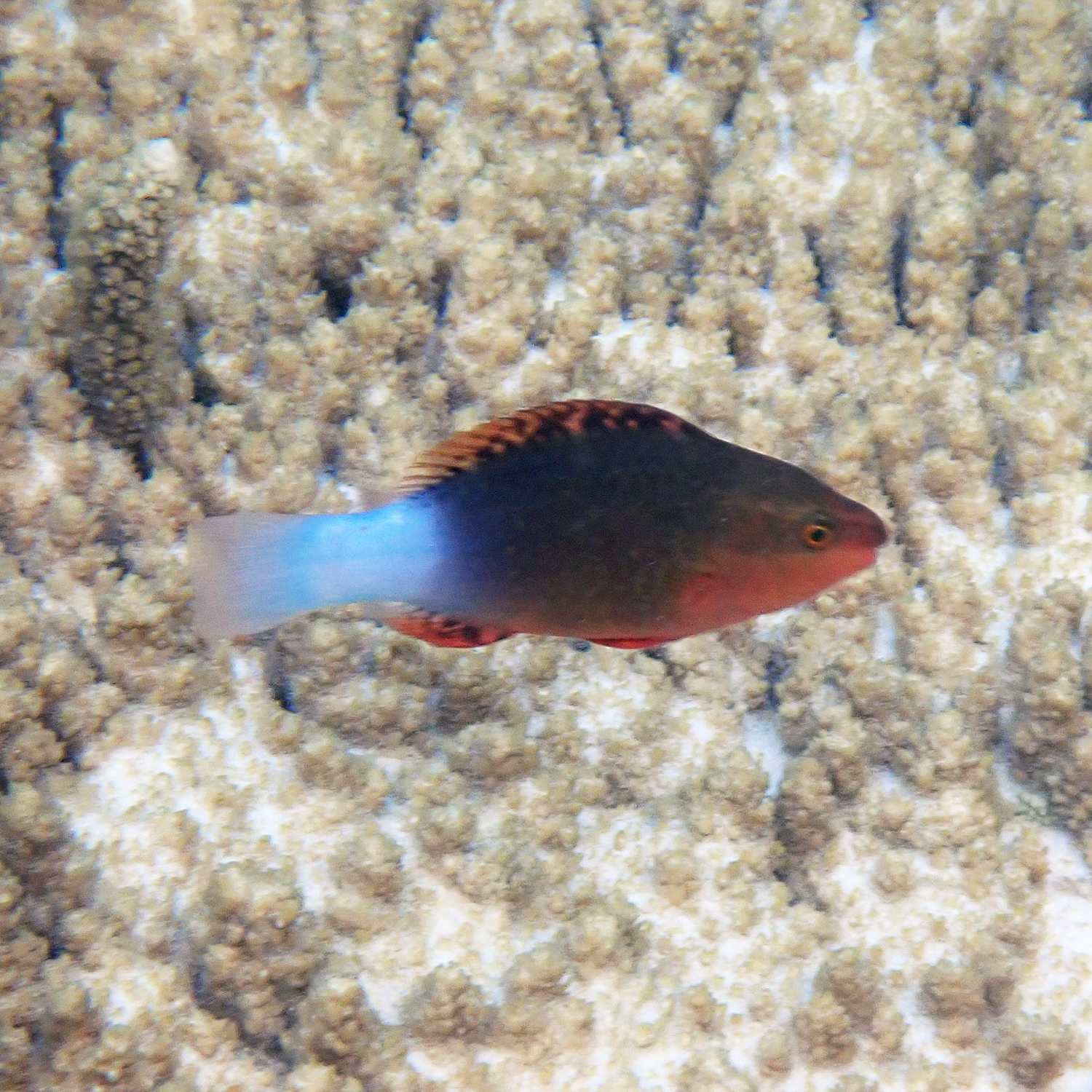
Juvenile

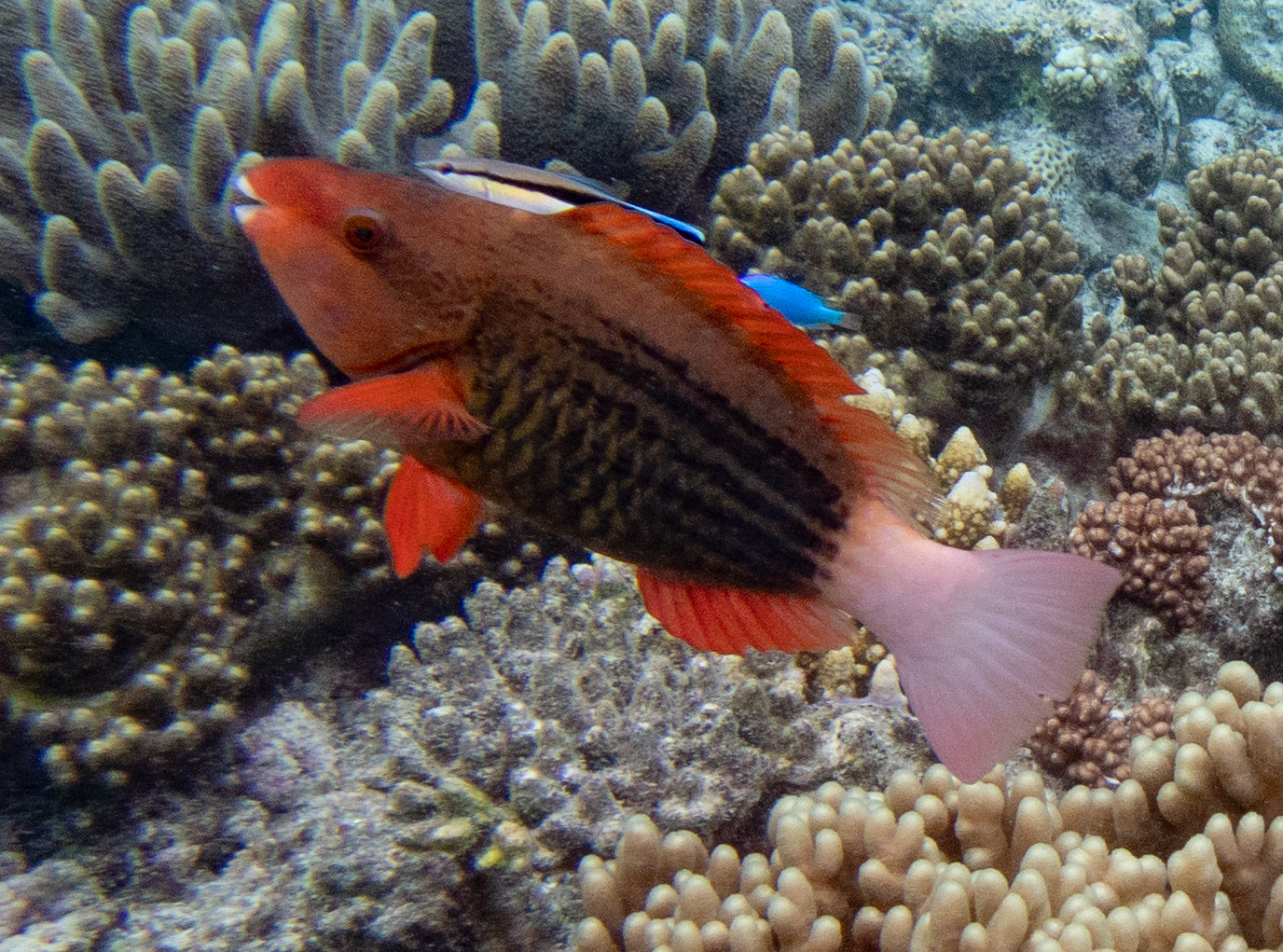
Initial phase

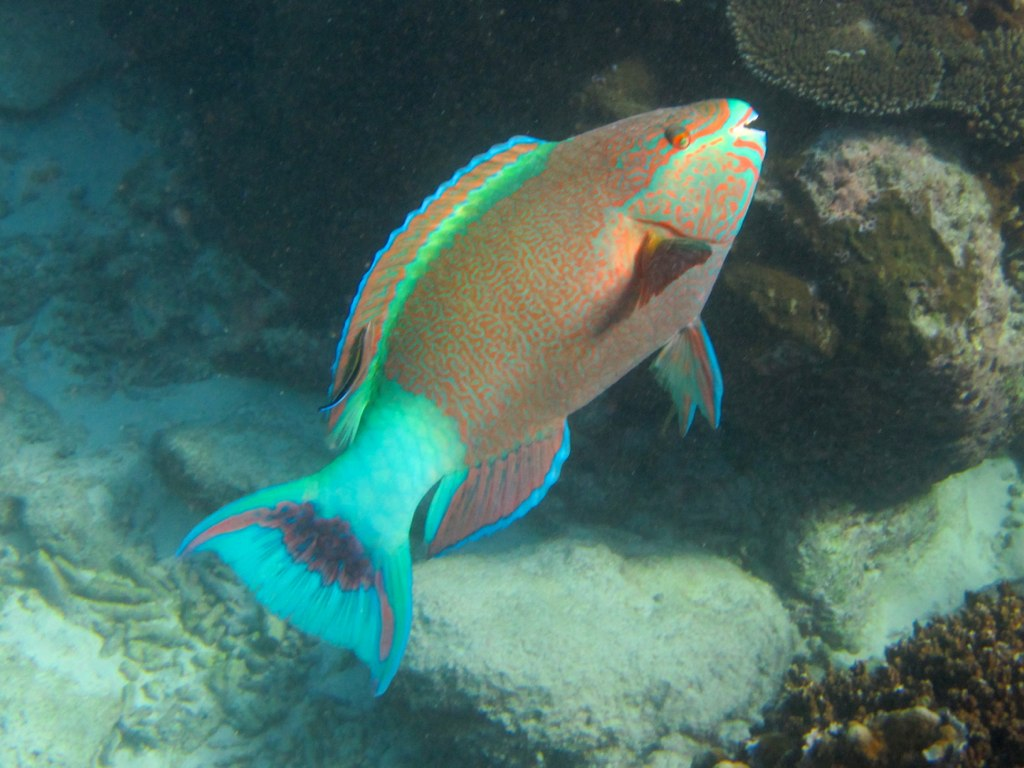
Terminal phase

== Habitat and behavior ==
Normally, the bridled parrotfish occurs at depths of 1–25 m on exposed outer reefs, occasionally in extremely shallow water. Juvenile specimens may be found in lagoons living within the rubble and coral of the reefs. This species is generally a solitary fish. While feeding, it may join schools of mixed species. It grazes on algae growing in the benthic zone.
