= 2-oxoglutarate decarboxylase =

Class of enzymes

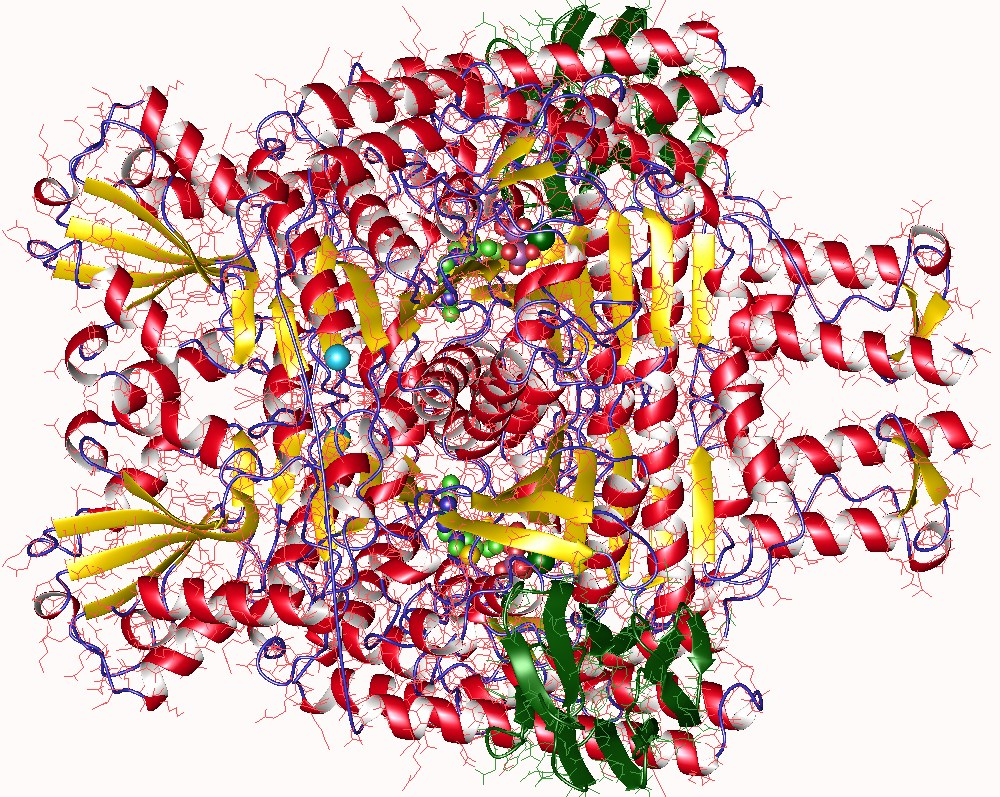
- 2-oxoglutarate decarboxylase heterotetramer, Mycobacterium smegmatis

Identifiers
- EC no.: 4.1.1.71
- CAS no.: 37205-42-8

Databases
- BRENDA: enzyme data
- ExPASy: NiceZyme view
- KEGG: enzyme entry
- MetaCyc: metabolic pathway
- Rhea: reactions
- PDB structures: RCSB PDB PDBe PDBsum
- Gene Ontology: AmiGO / QuickGO
Search
- PMC: articles
- PubMed: articles
- NCBI: proteins

2-oxoglutarate decarboxylase (EC 4.1.1.71) is an enzyme characterised from Euglena gracilis that catalyzes the decarboxylation of α-ketoglutaric acid to succinic semialdehyde and carbon dioxide:

α-ketoglutaric acid
CO_{2}
succinic semialdehyde

Thiamine pyrophosphate is used as a cofactor. The structure of the enxyme has been determined by X-ray crystallography. The enzyme has been of interest as part of pathways to produce fuels from cyanobacteria.

This enzyme is a lyase, specifically a carboxy-lyase, which cleave carbon-carbon bonds. The systematic name of this enzyme class is 2-oxoglutarate carboxy-lyase (succinate-semialdehyde-forming). Other names in common use include oxoglutarate decarboxylase, alpha-ketoglutarate decarboxylase, alpha-ketoglutaric decarboxylase, oxoglutarate decarboxylase, pre-2-oxoglutarate decarboxylase, and 2-oxoglutarate carboxy-lyase.
