= Chamaesiphonaceae =

Scientific classification
- Domain: Bacteria
- Phylum: Cyanobacteria
- Class: Cyanophyceae
- Order: Synechococcales
- Family: Chamaesiphonaceae; Borzì

Genera
- Chamaesiphon A. Braun & Grunow 1865; Chamaesiphonopsis Fritsch 1929; Clastidium Kirchner 1880; Cyanophanon Geitler 1956; Geitleribactron Komárek 1975

Family of bacteria

The Chamaesiphonaceae are a family of cyanobacteria.
