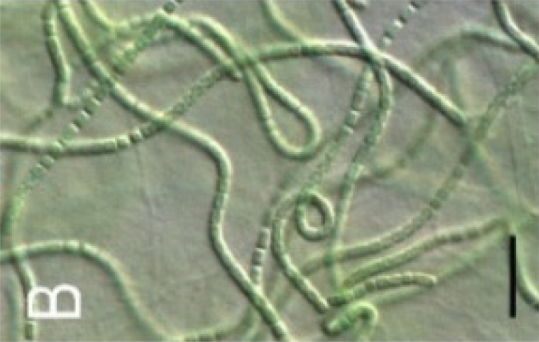
- Leptolyngbya cf. foveolarum

Scientific classification
- Domain: Bacteria
- Phylum: Cyanobacteria
- Class: Cyanophyceae
- Order: Synechococcales
- Family: Leptolyngbyaceae; Komárek et al. 2014

Genera
- Haloleptolyngbya Dadheech et al. 2012; Halomicronema Abed et al. 2002; Leibleinia (Gomont) Hoffmann 1985; Leptolyngbya Anagnostidis & Komárek 1988; Myxocorys Petrasiak et al. 2015 provis.; Neosynechococcus Dvořák et al. 2013; Nodosilinea Perkerson & Casamatta 2011; Oculatella Zammit et al. 2012; Phormidesmis Turicchia et al. 2009; Planktolyngbya Anagnostidis & Komárek 1988; Plectolyngbya Taton et al. 2011; Stenomitos Miscoe & Johansen 2015 provis.; Trichocoleus Anagnostidis 2001; Trichotorquatus Petrasiak & Johansen 2015 provis.

= Leptolyngbyaceae =

Family of bacteria

The Leptolyngbyaceae are a family of cyanobacteria.
