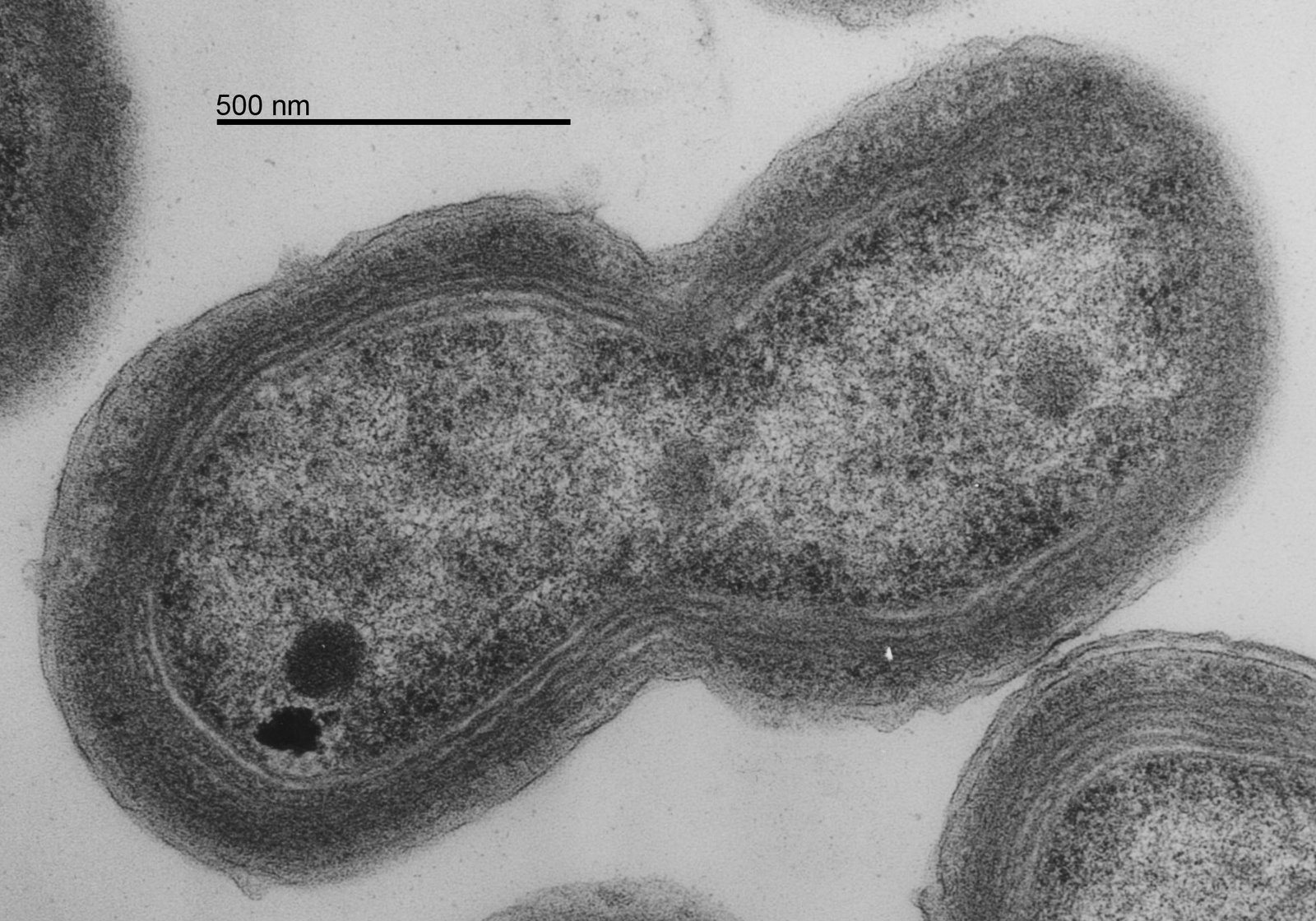
- TEM of Prochlorococcus MED4 dividing

Scientific classification
- Domain: Bacteria
- Kingdom: Bacillati
- Phylum: Cyanobacteriota
- Class: Cyanophyceae
- Order: Synechococcales

Families
- Acaryochloridaceae Komárek et al. 2014; Chamaesiphonaceae Borzì; Coelosphaeriaceae Elenkin; Heteroleibleiniaceae Komárek et al. 2014; Leptolyngbyaceae Komárek et al. 2014; Merismopediaceae Elenkin; Prochloraceae R. A. Lewin; Pseudanabaenaceae Anagnostidis & Komárek; Romeriaceae Komárek et al. 2014; Schizotrichaceae Elenkin; Synechococcaceae Komárek & Anagnostidis

= Synechococcales =

Order of bacteria

The Synechococcales are a proposed order of cyanobacteria, with over 70 genera. It includes both filamentous and single-celled types.

See Synechococcus § Taxonomy for a discussion of the ongoing resolution of historical "lumping" issues in this taxon.
