= Ralph A. Lewin =

Anglo-American biologist

Ralph Arnold Lewin (30 April 1921 – 30 November 2008) was an Anglo-American biologist, known as "the father of green algae genetics". He was born in London and later moved to America. He also was known as a poetry author.

== Education ==
He studied at University of Cambridge from 1939 to 1947, graduating with a B.A. in 1942 and MA in 1946, whilst at Cambridge he focussed on Botany. He then studied at Yale University from 1947 to 1951, graduating with an M.S. in 1949 and a PhD in Botany in 1950. In 1971 (or 1972), he was made a Doctor of Science (Sc.D.) of the University of Cambridge.

== Biography ==
Lewin spent nearly 48 years at the Scripps Institution of Oceanography at the University of California at San Diego and was considered a leading authority in multiple areas of marine biology.

Lewin joined the Scripps Institution as an associate professor of marine biology in 1960 and retired from that position as a full professor in 1991, remaining extremely active in laboratory and field research and lecturing nationally and internationally. He helped organize and teach courses on marine microbiology and algae for the United Nations Educational, Scientific and Cultural Organization in Finland, Singapore, and China. He published more than 250 scientific papers, among which his 2001 review paper entitled More on Merde was an entertaining review on the worth of feces in biomedicine. He addressed this issue frankly by stating, "Whereas food has always received much attention in conversation, commerce, and the literature, the subject of feces has been comparatively neglected. To fill this lacuna, a small book on comparative coprology was recently published (Lewin 1999). The present article aims to supplement this book with a review of overlooked or new items relating to biological and medical aspects of coprology, notably chemical and microbial components of human and animal feces, their uses as fertilizers, and a few other sociological impacts."

Ralph Lewin was an Esperantist, and was Ordinary Professor (orda profesoro) at Akademio Internacia de la Sciencoj San Marino, the only university in the world where all courses are studied in Esperanto.

He translated Winnie-the-Pooh into Esperanto with Ivy Kellerman Reed, and was the author of Merde: excursions in scientific, cultural and socio-historical coprology. (published Random House 1999, ISBN 0-375-50198-3)
