= Marine nitrogen fixation =

Biochemical process in marine environments

Nitrogen fixation is a vital biochemical process that supports the productivity of marine environments. It involves the conversion of nitrogen gas (N_{2}) to forms available to living organisms such as ammonia (NH_{3}), ammonium (NH^{+}_{4}), nitrate (NO^{−}_{3}), and nitrite (NO^{−}_{2}). Since nitrogen is a limiting nutrient in most marine ecosystems, nitrogen fixation plays a key role in sustaining primary production, particularly in oligotrophic regions. Currently about 13 prokaryote genera are known to fix nitrogen. Understanding marine nitrogen fixation is crucial to the study of global nitrogen cycling. Research indicates an imbalance between nitrogen fixation and denitrification rates, impacting nitrogen availability in different oceanic regions.

== History, context and research ==
Nitrogen was discovered in the 18th century, by the scientist Daniel Rutherford. Nitrogen's importance in agriculture, plant growth and the nitrogen cycle became clear. However, at this time, marine nitrogen fixation remained unexplored.

Biological nitrogen fixation was discovered by Hermann Hellriegel and Hermann Wilfarth in 1880. They discovered that the root nodules of legumes host nitrogen-fixing bacteria which convert atmospheric nitrogen gas into forms the plants could use. In the 20th century, tracing techniques including nitrogen-15 isotopes were used to study nitrogen fixation in aquatic environments. Specifically, cyanobacteria such as Trichodesmium were found to be major nitrogen fixers in the ocean. This confirmed microbes' role as nitrogen fixers in aquatic environments.

While less common than bacteria, nitrogen fixation has also been identified within some Archaea among methanogenic species. Historically, there has been a debate regarding how Archaea acquired the ability to fix nitrogen. One hypothesis, the bacteria-first hypothesis, suggests that the nitrogen fixation process evolved in bacteria before being transferred to Archaea via horizontal gene transfer. The diversity and abundance of nitrogen-fixing bacteria, along with isotopic data and the distribution of specialized nitrogenase genes provide evidence supporting this theory.

== Distribution of nitrogen fixation and balances ==
Divisions of the world's oceans centred on the South Pole. Animated to show the increased specificity of the division hierarchy.

=== Open ocean ===
Nitrogen fixers are widespread throughout the world's oceans, but vary in density depending on the abundance of nutrients, light availability, oxygen levels, temperature and season. The highest density of marine nitrogen fixers is observed in the pelagic zone, where oligotrophic conditions require the fixation of inorganic dinitrogen (N_{2}) via biological processes.

In oligotrophic waters, organic nitrogen is highly limited, reaching concentrations as below 1 μmol/L in the open ocean of the Mediterranean Sea. Fixation is the only way to convert atmospheric nitrogen to an organic form usable by the surrounding ecosystem. The deep waters of the subtropical and tropical latitudes of the North Atlantic ocean, as well as the Mediterranean Sea, have the highest levels of fixation, dominated by the filamentous cyanobacteria Trichodesmium spp. This species uses the enzyme nitrogenase to provide approximately 100 to 150 million tonnes of nitrogen per year globally in the open ocean.

The Pacific Ocean, especially at higher latitudes, acts as a sink for organic nitrogen. This is primarily due to the direct correlation between O_{2} levels and nitrogen fixation rates. The Pacific ocean performs Pacific meridional overturning circulation (PMOC) which pulls warmer waters from the Atlantic and subtopics into the upper latitudes of the Pacific. By the time it reaches the deep ocean however, it is depleted of oxygen and filled with organic waste which creates large oxygen minimum zones (OMZ) where fixation is low and denitrification is high. Despite these processes, the Pacific is not devoid of fixation. This ocean is dominated by single cell diazotrophs, particularly UCYN-A, which are capable of nitrification and can reach concentrations as high as 10^{6} cells per litre, even in oligotrophic waters.

=== Coastal ===
Fixation rates are lower in coastal systems compared to those of open waters. This is the result of a variety of factors, foremost being nutrient concentrations. Coastlines, which experience more upwelling in the higher latitudes, have less biotic nitrogen fixation. They instead rely on biologically available nitrogen existing in the ecosystem available as DOM or within organisms susceptible to grazing. Additionally, ammonium is made available in marine sediment via upwelling, with 76–83% organic nitrogen remineralized and redistributed by this process. Nitrogen concentrations, in the form of ammonia and nitrate, can exceed 100 μmol/L in coastal upwelling regions. The increased concentrations of available nitrogen mean that even species capable of fixation will rely on existing materials, suspending the process of the more costly fixation, thereby reducing rates. The variation is also dependent on the concentrations of other macronutrients, with particular dependence on the N:P ratio with species needing both for proper biosynthesis. Nitrogen fixation rates in surface waters ranged from below detection limits to 7.51 nmol N L^{−1} d^{−1} in coastal water depending on these varied factors. Considering the seasonal variability of upwelling and nutrient abundance in coastal waters means the fixation rates are dynamic with greater flux but on average, the productivity of coastal ecosystems keeps nitrogen production low.

=== Sediment ===
Nitrogenase operates exclusively under anaerobic conditions, and while most species have systems to allow the mitigation of this problem, many nitrogen fixers have their highest production within anaerobic conditions. Additionally, marine sediments display lower concentrations of both nitrogen and phosphorus, particularly at lower depths. At only 6 cm depth, available nitrogen decreases by as much as 50%. This is why a large amount of nitrogen fixation occurs within marine sediments. Fixation rates additionally vary with temperature of the sedimentary substrate. The concentration of O_{2} also varies alongside nutrient availability, penetrating less as temperature increases increasing competition for resources amongst heterotrophs.

== Research methodologies ==
=== Stable isotope tracer experiments ===
Stable isotope tracers allow for both macro and micro scaled experiments. Using a variety of different isotopes, researchers can observe the distribution and uptake of different nutrients in diverse ecosystems. Traditionally, these experiments track the incorporation of these radio nutrients into specific organisms but with the aid of satellite imaging and large scale sampling, they can track the incorporation into biomass of an ecosystem as a whole.

Nitrogen experiments use the quasi-conservative tracer N* (Nstar) to track the linear relationship between Nitrogen and Phosphorus nitrification and denitrification. N* is a stable Nitrogen tracer that displays a linear association with marine phosphorus and therefore provides a means of visualizing nitrogen and fixation in marine systems on a large scale.

Following the addition of N*, water samples are collected from various latitudes within the same gyre to track nitrogen distribution. This method allows for the visualization of nitrogen distribution on a large scale and is often supplemented with satellite imaging to gather accurate distribution data. Additionally, these experiment are used to calculate global fixation rates as well as the flux within these rates making it one of the best large scale research methods.

=== Quantitative PCR (qPCR) and RT-PCR ===
PCR has a long standing relationship in genetic and microbiological experiments. By identifying genetic markers with functions specific to nitrogen fixation processes allows researchers to express and quantify those genes within marine samples, allowing for approximate measurements of marine fixers density in varied ecosystems.

By quantifying the planktonic nifH genes through amplification, nitrogen fixation can be estimated in both filtered samples and laboratory cultures tracking the change over time under varied conditions. This process can also be used to identify and quantify species that cannot be cultured as the genetic markers are organism specific and are present in sample even following the lysis of cells.

Despite being easier, specifically with modern equipment, this method only provides estimates, not accurate counts due to bottling and other manipulatory effects present in most laboratory experiments. Additionally, it only shows the density of microbes with the potential to perform nitrogen fixation, not the actual rate of expression. While this technique is a powerful tool, it is often supplemented with other tools for accurate measurements and analysis.

=== Mesocosm and laboratory culture experiments ===
The variability of marine ecosystems forces the majority of nitrification and fixation research to be performed in the lab. Nitrification rates are calculated in a lab setting by comparing the concentrations of NO^{−}_{2}, NO^{−}_{3}, and NH^{+}_{4} following incubation of filtered marine samples either in specific cultures or in bottled samples.

These experiments work for aquatic and sediment species dependent on their ability to survive in an enclosed system. Specific nitrogen-fixing species can be isolated on plates, but their often pseudo-anaerobic nature makes this difficult for many species. Mesocosm experiments are not performed in the presence of diverse marine systems. Instead, their controlled, laboratory based methodology means that some factors of the traditionally dynamic marine systems may be missed and therefore, an understanding of the whole picture remains elusive.

== Processes in the ocean ==
=== Biochemical pathways ===
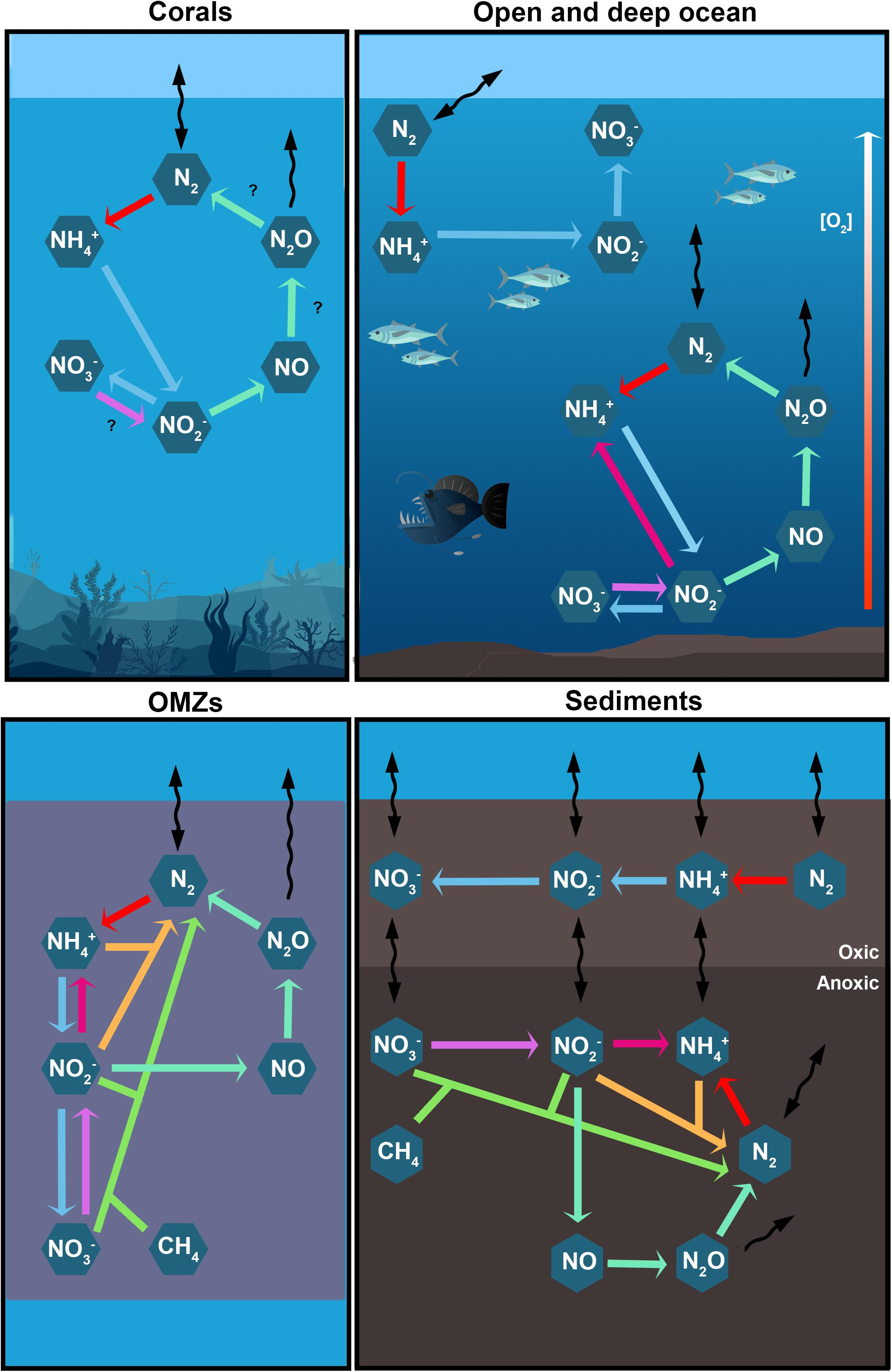
Marine nitrogen cycling pathways in different oceanic environments, specifically corals, open and deep ocean, oxygen minimum zones (OMZs), and sediments. Arrows indicate transformations of forms of nitrogen gas. Nitrogen fixation can be shown as the conversion of N_{2} to NH^{+}_{4}. The black arrows represent nitrogen gas exchange with the atmosphere.

Nitrogen fixation is a complex biochemical process that requires energy and is influenced by various environmental factors. In the surface ocean, nitrogen fixers consume phosphate (PO^{3−}_{4}) and iron (Fe^{n+}) to support their growth while converting atmospheric nitrogen gas (N_{2}) into ammonium (NH^{+}_{4}) and nitrate (NO^{−}_{3}), which are essential for many biological processes in the ocean. As remineralization occurs, these microorganisms release phosphate, iron, and nitrate into the water column and their carbon-rich biomass sinks to deeper waters, contributing to the oceanic carbon cycle.

=== Environmental factors influencing marine nitrogen fixation ===
==== Nutrient availability ====
A crucial factor for nitrogen fixers. Maintaining adequate levels of iron and phosphorus has been shown to be critical for microorganisms to carry out nitrogen fixation effectively.

==== Light ====
It serves as a vital energy source for photosynthetic nitrogen fixers, and insufficient intensity will reduce their ability to perform efficiently.

==== Oxygen levels ====
The nitrogenase enzymes encoded in nitrogen fixers are highly sensitive to oxygen. To overcome this challenge, some microorganisms have evolved adaptations to form specialized cells called heterocyst (create a low-oxygen environment) that allow nitrogen fixation to occur spatially different from the oxygen-producing photosynthesis processes.

==== Temperature ====
When ocean temperatures rise, Trichodesmium populations tend to shift toward higher latitudes, potentially leading to a decline in their presence in tropical regions. These changes could significantly affect nitrogen availability, global distribution of nitrogen-fixing species, and disrupt overall ecosystem productivity across different oceanic regions.

==== Seasonality ====
Seasonality plays a large role in the variability of all other factors. Fixation is lowest in the summer, particularly in coastal regions, due to the influence temperate summer conditions have on the process of upwelling. Upwelling is strongest in the summer months: April to August in the northern hemisphere and December to February in the southern hemisphere. This flood of available nitrogen is complemented by blooms of photosynthetic species, so that cellular production is increased overall and DON (dissolved organic nitrogen) is greatly increased, reducing the need for fixation.

== Free-living marine nitrogen fixation species ==
There is a diverse range of marine species that contribute as nitrogen fixers to ensure a continuous supply of bioavailable nitrogen for primary production. The best-known of them are cyanobacteria, which are photoautotrophs able to feed themselves. On the other hand, metagenomic data suggests significant contribution by heterotrophs, though it remains unclear whether they are truly free-living.

=== Unicellular cyanobacteria ===
Free-living unicellular cyanobacteria need to supply their own carbon via photosynthesis, which leads to oxygen production. The solution adopted by Crocosphaera (C. watsonii and C. subtropica ATCC 51142, formerly lumped into Cyanothece) is to store up starch in the day to use in nighttime. When night comes, photosystem II turns inactive and intracellular oxygen level is reduced, allowing nitrogenase to work. This rhythm persists even under continuous light.

=== Filamentous cyanobacteria ===
==== Heterocyst-forming species ====
Organisms including Nodularia spp. and Anabaena spp. have developed heterocysts, which are thick-walled, structurally distinct cells that create an anoxygenic environment necessary for nitrogenase enzyme in nitrogen fixers. Among other things, these cells do not produce photosystem II but continue to make photosystem I, making them engage in photorespiration.

==== Trichodesmium ====
Trichodesmium is particularly important in nutrient-poor (sub)tropical surface waters; and, unlike many others, it does not form heterocysts. Instead, cells in a colony takes turns in switching between oxygenic photosynthesis and photorespiring nitrogen production.

=== Symbiotic diazotrophs ===
They For example, Richelia intracellularis is a heterocystous cyanobacterium that forms symbiotic relationships with diatom Hemiaulus hauckii. Diazotroph resides within the diatom's frustule, where it benefits from stable conditions and access to nutrients. In return, the diatom host This partnership enhances nitrogen availability in marine ecosystems, promotes more diatom growth, and enables the biogeochemical cycling on a global scale.

== Major nitrogen-fixing symbionts ==
Organisms form various symbiotic relationships, including mutualism, commensalism, and parasitism. Many symbiotic diazotrophs exhibit mutualism with the host cell, the benefit being receiving carbon, nutrients, and other metabolites in return for supplying a biologically available form of nitrogen to the host.

Nitrogen-fixing symbiotes contribute significantly to nitrogen fixation in oligotrophic regions.

=== Cyanobacterial symbionts ===
Cyanobacteria, the oldest known photosynthetic prokaryotes, form symbiotic relationships with various unicellular and multicellular organisms which exhibit diverse metabolic pathways, including diatoms, dinoflagellates and haptophytes. Unicellular and filamentous cyanobacteria are both observed to have symbiotic relationships.

A cyanobacterium living in association with the host can receive extra carbon from the host in exchange for the nitrogen it fixes. In unicellular cases (such as the UCYN-A "nitroplast"), this allows the symbiont to entirely forgo oxygenic photosynthesis and become able to fix nitrogen during the day. In filamentous cases (such as Richelia), the heterocysts receive much more carbon than it would ordinarily receive in a free-living colony, allowing it to make more nitrogen.

==== Candidatus Atelocyanobacterium thalassa (UCYN-A) ====
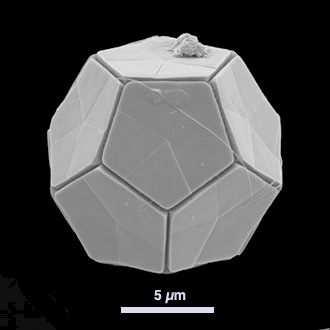
Scanning electron micrograph of Braarudosphaera bigelowii. Haptophyte algae, coccolithophore that forms symbiotic relationships with Candidatus Atelocyanobacterium thalassa. Found in open ocean and coastal environments.

Candidatus Atelocyanobacterium thalassa, also called UCYN-A, is found to form close symbiosis with haptophyte algae, Braarudosphaera bigelowii, and their relationship is described as obligate endosymbiosis. Various nutrients, such as amino acids, purines, vitamins, and carbon sources in the form of glucose and glycerol-3-phosphate transferred from the host to UCYN-A, which is essential for its metabolic function and nitrogen assimilation. In return, UCYN-A provides fixed nitrogen as ammonium, ammonia, alanine, and glycine. Additionally, reduced genome size, loss of genes for carbon uptake and photosynthesis, increase in gene expression for nitrogen fixation for UCYN-A, as well as a decrease in ammonium uptake by B. bigelowii further represents the adaptation of both species to depend on this symbiotic relationship.

==== Richelia ====
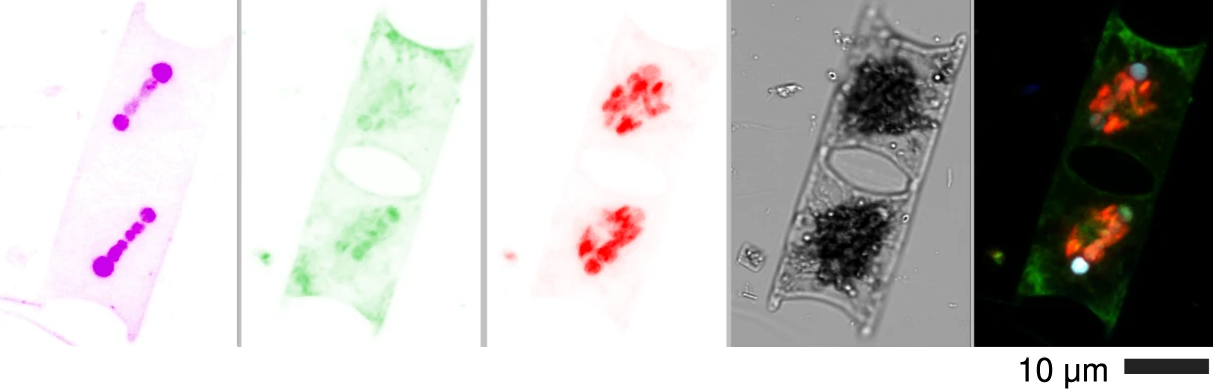
The image of Hemiaulus—R. euintracellularis symbiosis obtained by environmental high content fluorescence microscopy (eHCFM).

Richelia is a genus of filamentous cyanobacterial diazotrophs. Its members display symbiotic relationships with diatoms, described as diatom–dinotroph associations (DDAs).

The R. euintracellularis displays symbiotic assodiation with Hemiaulus diatoms as an endobiont, meaning that it lives fully in the host cell cytoplasm. It is wholly dependent on the host and not known to live freely. The domination of Hemiaulus-R. intracellularis symbiosis is seen in various pelagic systems, marking a greater contribution to the nitrogen and carbon fixation. There is a positive correlation between nitrogen assimilation by R. euintracellularis and photosynthesis by the host diatom. It is possible to grow the host diatom without the addition of nitrogen in a laboratory setting.

R. intracellularis is associated with Rhizosolenia. It lives in the periplasm.

R. rhizosoleniae is associated with mainly Chaetoceros, attached to their spines, i.e. outside of the cell wall. Neutral metabolism dependency was suggested through increasing nitrogen fixation rate compared to its free form and growth restriction. It remains able to live freely, being especially prone to do so when nitrogen is sufficient.

=== Non-cyanobacterial symbionts ===
Candidatus Tectiglobus diatomicola is classified under Rhizobia, a heterotrophic nitrogen-fixing proteobacterium symbiont that has an obligate endosymbiotic relationship with a pennate diatom Haslea. Rhizobia has been known to have facultative endosymbiotic relationship with terrestrial legume. The reduced genome size and low transcription of glycolysis-related genes of Ca. T. diatomicola suggest that it relies on Haslea on bypassing glycolysis. Haslea also relies on ammonium sources, as 99% of fixed nitrogen is transferred to Haslea.

=== Evolution to the organelle ===
The evolutionary development of symbiotic relationships is found in many cellular mechanisms, such as chloroplasts in photosynthetic eukaryotes. The gradual evolution of organelles from endosymbiotic relationships does not have a distinguishing point that indicates the difference. Researchers use various criteria as indicators of organelle transformation, including genetic integration, cellular integration, and metabolic integration. However, categorization becomes especially challenging when curtain endosymbiosis is in the process of transformation, as indicators of both endosymbiosis and organelle may coexist.

==== Diazoplast ====
Due to the insufficient genetic integration and little to no endosymbiotic gene transfer (EGT) to the host diatom, diazoplasts could be classified as endosymbiotic symbionts. However, completion of high metabolic and cellular integration may be the indicator of organelle. Diazoplasts are found within the cells of the diatom Epithemia and are present in all species of this genus. This constant existence of intercellular diazotroph, high degree of nutrient dependence on host, and absence of regulation for nitroganase synthesis may indicate the organelle-like function.

==== Nitroplast ====
While some metabolic co-dependence between UCYN-A and Braarudosphaera bigelowii can be the evidence for both symbiosis and organelle, the level of genetic integration, generally assessed through the amount of genes transferred to the organelle and those lost from it, is suggested by the significant portion of UCYN-A proteins that are encoded from B. bigelowii. The cellular integration, including the close association of UCYN-A and other organelles in the B. bigelowii during cell division and consistent size correlation of UCYN-A with B. bigelowii, also suggests the organelle function.

== Industrial and human implications ==
=== Anthropogenic nitrogen in oceans ===
Since 1850, the rate of anthropogenic reactive nitrogen deposition has doubled in oceanic systems, driven by human activities such as agriculture, fossil fuel combustion, aquaculture, and household and industrial waste disposal. Agriculture in the United States alone contributes about 11 million tonnes of nitrogen through the use of fertilisers. Through agricultural runoff, this nitrogen seeps through soil into waterways and eventually reaches marine ecosystems. Similarly, atmospheric nitrogen from fossil fuel combustion is deposited into water systems through precipitation or dry deposition, before being carried into the ocean by streams. In aquaculture, dissolved nitrogen waste primarily comes from unused feed and fish waste. Sewage, of which about 80% is left untreated, is sometimes disposed of directly into oceans.

==== Consequences of excess nitrogen ====
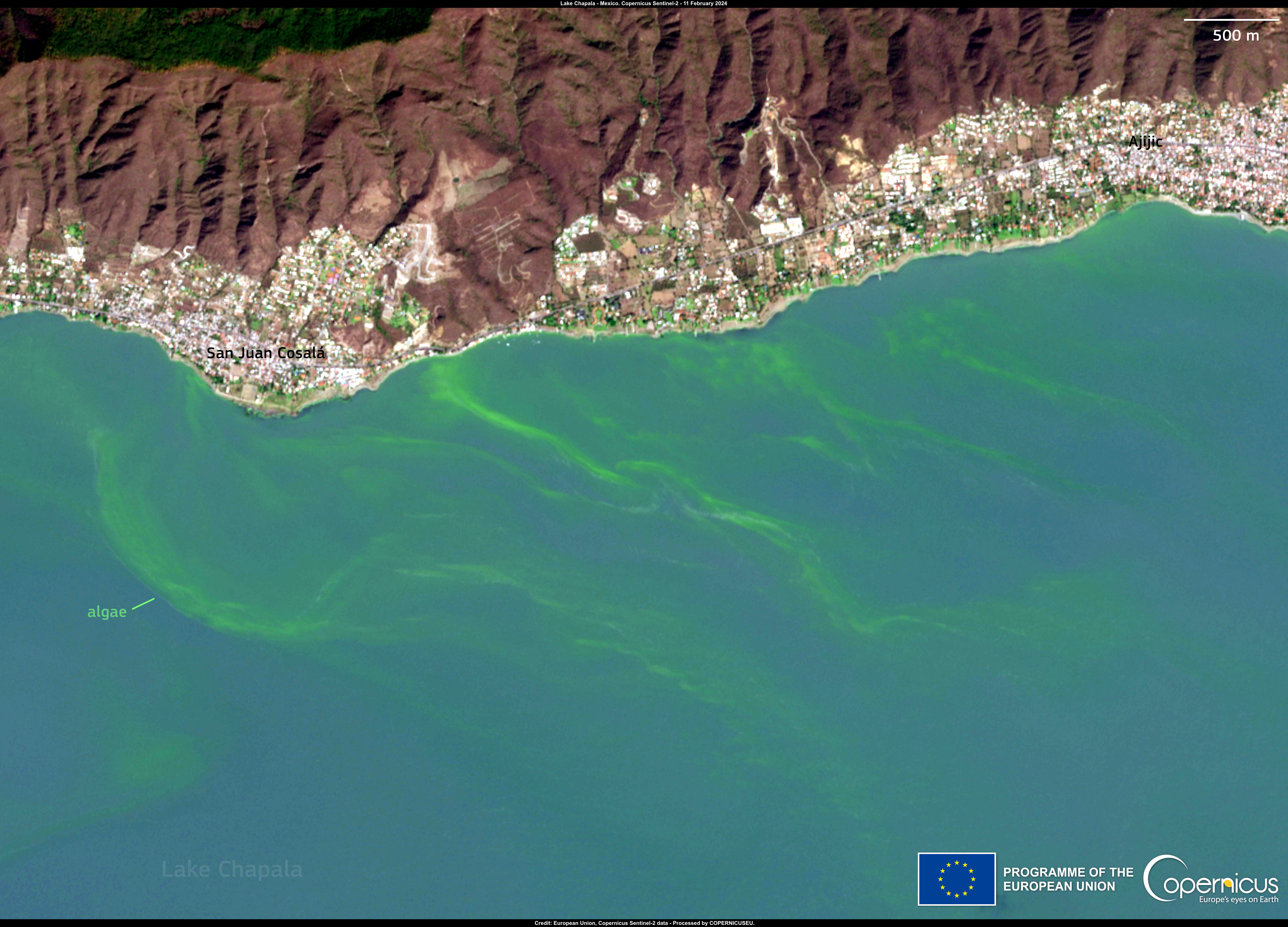
Algae bloom in Lake Chapala, México

Excess nitrogen concentrations in marine ecosystems can lead to toxic algae blooms, a loss of biodiversity, marine dead zones and shellfish poisoning. Toxic algae blooms occur when excess nitrogen and phosphorus allow algae and phytoplankton to grow uncontrollably on surface water. They rapidly consume oxygen and block sunlight from penetrating deeper water in a process called eutrophication. As a result, the local biodiversity is greatly reduced, especially in bottom-dwelling species. This may lead to the formation of "dead zones", areas which have a dissolved oxygen concentration of less than 2 mL of O_{2}/litre and thus cannot support marine life. Geological evidence suggests most dead zones today did not exist prior to anthropogenic nitrogen deposition, but rather studies show that their numbers have increased exponentially (doubled each decade) since the 1960s. The Gulf of Mexico Dead Zone, in the northern Gulf of Mexico, is one of the world's largest hypoxic areas, with excess nitrogen flowing in from the mouth of the Mississippi River. Although the Gulf of Mexico Dead Zone is considered seasonal, records indicate that since 1985 it continues to occur increasingly frequently and in larger areas, negatively impacting marine life and the many dependent fisheries.

Surviving shellfish can become contaminated. As filter-feeders, they filter and absorb toxins produced by the phytoplankton associated with algal blooms. These toxins are difficult to eliminate, as they are not destroyed by cooking or freezing, and thus can cause severe disease in humans when ingested.

Nitrogen pollution also affects tourism in areas dependent on boating and fishing activities. Each year the United States tourism industry loses an estimated US$1 billion due to nitrogen-induced algal blooms.

=== Mitigation strategies ===
Mitigation strategies to reduce marine anthropogenic nitrogen deposition vary depending on the source of pollution. To reduce agricultural runoff, practices such as the use of winter cover crops and perennial cropping systems have successfully mitigated nitrogen leakage. Most agricultural runoff occurs during winter and spring, when moisture levels drop and evapotranspiration rates decrease. Winter cover crops protect soil during these seasons, and perennial crops such as alfalfa, allow stronger nitrogen retention. Growing these on agricultural land has reportedly resulted in 3 times and 30–50 times less nitrogen leaching, respectively. Policy and educational measures to reduce excessive and unnecessary fertilisation have also been implemented.

To reduce nitrogen pollution from human and industrial activities, the more widespread use of advanced denitrification wastewater plants is suggested. Currently, the cost of building and maintaining such facilities prevents the majority of wastewater produced globally from being adequately treated. More efficient nitrogen removal and recovery processes are currently being developed to address this issue.

Other mitigation strategies that have been implemented include the construction of artificial habitats and waterway rehabilitation. Habitats such as wetlands and lagoons act as nitrogen sinks and prevent its constant seepage into the ocean. Similarly, waterways such as rivers and lakes can be rehabilitated to improve their nitrogen retention. They then act as buffers, reducing marine nitrogen fluxes.
