= Plastid evolution =

Evolution

A plastid is a membrane-bound organelle found in plants, algae and other eukaryotic organisms that contribute to the production of pigment molecules. Most plastids are photosynthetic, thus leading to color production and energy storage or production. There are many types of plastids in plants alone, but all plastids can be separated based on the number of times they have undergone endosymbiotic events. Currently there are three types of plastids; primary, secondary and tertiary. Endosymbiosis is reputed to have led to the evolution of eukaryotic organisms today, although the timeline is highly debated.

Possible cladogram of chloroplast evolution Circles represent endosymbiotic events. For clarity, dinophyte tertiary endosymbioses and many nonphotosynthetic lineages have been omitted.^{a} It is now established that Chromalveolata is paraphyletic to Rhizaria.

== Primary endosymbiosis ==
The first plastid is highly accepted within the scientific community to be derived from the engulfment of ancestor cyanobacteria into a eukaryotic organism, the ancestor to all extant archaeplastidans. Evidence supporting this belief is found in many morphological similarities such as the presence of a two plasma membranes. It is thought that the first membrane belonged to the cyanobacterium. During phagocytosis, a vesicle engulfs the cyanobacterium, which avoided digestion and led to the double membrane found in primary plastids. However, in order to live in symbiosis, the eukaryotic cell that engulfed the cyanobacterium must now provide proteins and metabolites to maintain the functions of the bacteria in exchange for energy. Thus, an engulfed cyanobacterium must give up some of its genetic material to allow for endosymbiotic gene transfer to the eukaryote, a phenomenon that is thought to be extremely rare due to the "learned nature" of the interactions that must occur between the cells to allow for processes such as; gene transfer, protein localization, excretion of highly reactive metabolites, and DNA repair. This would mean a reduction in genome size for the cyanobacteria, but also an increase in cytobacterial genes within the eukaryotic genome. The Synechocystis sp. strain PCC6803 is a unicellular fresh water cyanobacterium that encodes 3725 genes, and a 3.9 Mb sized genome. However, most plastids rarely exceed 200 protein coding genes. In 2017, a new species of cyanobacterium called Gloeomargarita lithophora was discovered. According to the author's phylogenetic methods, it is the closest living relative of the ancestral engulfed cyanobacterium known so far.

=== Other cyanobionts ===
Cyanobacteria have in several other instances entered into a symbiotic relationship with an eukaryote. This phenomenon is so common that there is a word to refer to cyanobacterial symbioants: cyanobiont. These associations range from loose facultative extracellular relationships to tightly-coupled obligate intracellular relationships, with some going further to display features of the organelle lifestyle such as synchonized cell division, endosymbiotic gene transfer, and dependence on host-imported proteins. These systems are a lens into how the archaeplastidan chloroplast could have evolved.

==== Photosynthetic ====
Somewhere about 90–140 million years ago, primary endosymbiosis happened again in the amoeboid Paulinella with a cyanobacterium in the genus Prochlorococcus. This independently evolved photosynthetic organelle is often called a chromatophore instead of a chloroplast.

The ciliate Pseudoblepharisma tenue has a new acquisition of a photosynthetic organelle derived not from a cyanobacterium, but from a purple bacterium.

==== Nitrogen-fixing ====
Most free-living cyanobacteria are capable of both photosynthesis and nitrogen fixation. Chloroplasts are only capable of the former, leaving the other role missing: nitrogen is one of the major essential nutrients for plants and other photosynthetic eukaryotes. In a few lineages, a second cyanobacterial symbioant has taken up the role of nitrogen fixation.

A 2010 study sequenced the genome of Anabaena azollae that was living ectosymbiotically with the water-fern Azolla filiculoides. Symbiosis was supported by the fact that the cyanobacterium was unable to grow autonomously, and the observance of the cyanobacterium being vertically transferred between succeeding generations. After cyanobacterium genome analysis, the researchers found that over 30% of the genome was made up of pseudogenes. In addition, roughly 600 transposable elements were found within the genome. The pseudogenes were found in genes such as dnaA, DNA repair genes, glycolysis and nutrient uptake genes. dnaA is essential to initiation of DNA replication in prokaryotic organisms, thus Azolla filiculoides is thought to provide nutrients, and transcriptional factors for DNA replication in exchange for fixed nitrogen that is not readily available in water. Although the cyanobacterium had not been completely engulfed in the eukaryotic organism, the relationship is thought to demonstrate the precursor to endosymbiotic primary plastids.

The genus Richelia contains three species in different stages of symbiotic integration with diatoms: epibiont (on the surface), periplasmic (inside cell wall, outside the plasma membrane), and endobiont (inside the plasma membrane). With increased integration comes progressively more gene loss, a living example of the result of codependence.

The diazoplast (Note: Contrary to what the -plast suffix may imply, these organelles are not derived from the original, archaeplastidian, plastid.) is an endosymbiote of Epithemia diatoms. The number per host cell is generally fixed. They have lost their photosynthetic genes and are dependent on host-derived sugars as the source of energy. However, they are minimally reliant on host-imported proteins, a counterpoint to the idea that organelle integration requries co-dependence enforced by horizontal gene transfer to host and protein import from host.

The nitroplast is an endosymbiote of Braarudosphaera bigelowii coccolithophores. These symbionts show all three aforementioned features of organelles. They also have their circadian rhythm synchonized with the host's. The nitroplast is only one lineage of "Ca. Atelocyanobacterium thalassa". There are other lineages that are apparently in an earlier stage of integration.

== Secondary endosymbiosis ==
Secondary endosymbiosis results in the engulfment of an organism that has already performed primary endosymbiosis. Thus, three plasma membranes are formed. The first originating from the cyanobacteria, the second from the eukaryote that engulfed the cyanobacteria, and the third from the eukaryote who engulfed the primary endosymbiotic eukaryote.

== Tertiary endosymbiosis ==
Although previous endosymbiotic events resulted in the increase in the number of membranes, tertiary plastids can have 3-4 membranes. The most largely studied tertiary plastids are found in dinoflagellates, where several independent tertiary endosymbiosis events have occurred.

In the groups that contains a haplophyte plastid, these tertiary plastids are believed to have been derived from a red algae replacing secondary plastids. Consistent with the expected reduction in genome size, and incorporation of genes into the host genome, tertiary plastid genome consists of about 14 genes. These genes are broken down further into small minicircles that contain 1-3 genes. These genomes are circular like prokaryotic genomes. Further, they only encode atpA, atpB, petB, perD, psaA, psaB, psbA-E, psbI, 16S and 23S rRNA. These genes play vital proteins used in photosystem I and II, indicating further their cyanobacterial origin. Unusually, the three lineages that contain a haplophyte plastid each acquired their plastid independently.

"Dinotoms" (Durinskia and Kryptoperidinium) have plastids derived from diatoms. These are highly unusual among tertiary endosymbioants as the symbioant is not reduced to a mere plastid: instead, it still has a DNA-containing nucleus, a large volume of cytoplasm, and even its own DNA-containing mitochondria.

Two undescribed dinoflagellates ("MGD" and "TGD") contain green algal endosymbionts with relic nuclei (nucleomorphs), most closely related to Pedinomonas.

== Genome ==
Chloroplasts contain 16S rRNA and 23S rRNA. 16S and 23S rRNA is found only in prokaryotes by definition. Chloroplasts and mitochondria also replicate semi-autonomously outside of the cell cycle replication system via binary fission. Consistent with the theory, decreased genome size within the organelle and gene integration into the nucleus occurred. Chloroplasts genomes encode 50-200 proteins, compared to the thousands in cyanobacterium. Furthermore, in Arabidopsis, nearly 20% of the nuclear genome originate from cyanobacterium, the highly recognized origin of chloroplasts. Recent studies have been able to identify the speed and size at which chloroplast genes are able to incorporate themselves into the host genome. Using chloroplast transformation genes encoding spectinomycin and kanamycin resistance were inserted into the DNA of chloroplasts found in tobacco plants. After subjecting the plants to spectinomycin and kanamycin selection, some plants began to tolerate spectinomycin and kanamycin. Roughly 1 in every 5 million cells on the tobacco leaves highly expressed spectinomycin and kanamycin resistant genes. By using the cells expressing resistances, they were able to grow tobacco from these cells to maturity. Once mature, the plants were mated with wild-type plants, and 50% of the progeny expressed spectinomycin and kanamycin resistance genes. Pollen was thought not to be able to transfer chloroplast DNA in tobacco (which later turned out not to be as true as was thought at the time), thus leading to believe that the genes were incorporated into the tobaccos genome. Furthermore, 11kb of integrated chloroplast DNA was introduced to the host genome, transferring more DNA that previously predicted at a faster rate than previously predicted.
