= Fungal-bacterial endosymbiosis =

Fungal-bacterial endosymbiosis encompasses the mutualistic relationship between a fungus and intracellular bacteria species residing within the fungus. Many examples of endosymbiotic relationships between bacteria and plants, algae and insects exist and have been well characterized, however fungal-bacteria endosymbiosis has been less well described.

Fungal-bacterial endosymbiosis represents a diverse range of endosymbionts and hosts with respect to the initiation of the association and the benefits provided by and for each partner. Well-studied examples include Burkholderia species (sp.)/Rhizopus microsporus (R. microsporus), Nostoc punctiforme (N. punctiforme)/Geosiphon pyriforme (G. pyriforme) and Candidatus Glomeribacter gigasporarum (Ca. G. sporarum) /Gigaspora margarita (G. margarita) bacteria/fungi associations. What is known on these associations impacts our understanding of the ecological interactions of plants, fungi and bacteria.

== Taxonomy ==
The classification of bacterial endosymbionts and their fungal partners occur across a diverse set of phyla. Ca. G. sporarum and Burkholderia sp. have been identified to be β-proteobacteria, a gram-negative class of bacteria, and N. punctiforme is a cyanobacteria . These phyla are not closely related showing that the capability of endosymbiosis with fungi is widely spread. A similar pattern is seen with the fungal partners with examples occurring across broad phyla/divisions such as Glomeromycota, Zygomycota, Ascomycota and Basidiomycota. The common feature of these fungi is that they are often arbuscular or ectomycorrhizal fungi and form symbiotic relations with plants as well as with their bacterial endosymbionts. Though commonalities exist, the taxonomic classification does not offer a consistent symbiotic phenotype.

== Morphology ==
The definition of “endosymbiont” indicates that the bacteria are localized within the cytoplasm of cells or hyphae of the fungi partner. Specifically, the bacteria grow within the membranes of their fungal counterpart, commonly referred to as vacuoles or symbiosomes. This is a feature common in all fungal-bacterial symbiosis suggesting that internalization of the bacteria via phagocytosis is the main method of incorporation.

== Life cycles ==
The bacteria involved may be internalized by the fungi on a cyclic basis or obligatorily living within the fungi. The interaction between N. punctiforme and G. pyriforme is an example of a cyclical association which forms at a certain point in their separate life cycles. N. punctiforme forms masses of filaments which gather in the dimmer underground soil while G. pyriforme grows lateral vegetative hyphae occupying the same area. The endosymbiotic relationship is formed when G. pyriforme engulf and internalize N. punctiforme in their growing hyphae in specialized compartments. Within the fungi, N. punctiforme replicates for the duration of about 6 months, coinciding with the life span of Geosiphon. Ca. G. sporarum, in contrast, is an obligate endosymbiont in the AM (arbuscular mycorrhizal) fungus G. margarita. They have been observed replicating within vacuoles and have been found in all stages of the life of the fungus including the spores, vegetative hyphae, and plant cell-associated hyphae. It is thought that the bacteria are transmitted vertically from parent to offspring in the fungi as permanent residents. Thus, bacterial endosymbionts are typically incorporated into growing fungi either through phagocytosis during some point in the life cycle of the fungus or passed on vertically forming permanent associations with the fungus.

== Benefits and metabolism ==
In most cases, bacteria provide the fungus with some form of metabolic benefit while the fungus often provides a suitable living environment. Burkholderia sp. in R. microsporus have been found to produce rhizoxin, an inhibitor of mitosis originally thought to be produced by R. microsporus itself. The production of rhizoxin by Burkholderia sp. leading to the death of plant cells allows R. microsporus to gain greater access to nutrients. The bacteria also appears to play a role in dictating asexual spore formation in R. microsporus. The benefit gained by the bacteria in this case is not specifically known. In other cases such as N. punctiforme and Ca. G. sporarum, nutrient exchange exists between the partners. N. punctiforme are autotrophic cyanobacteria capable of fixing nitrogen and provides G. pyriforme with fixed nitrogen. Ca. G. sporarum, on the other hand, has been found to increase the content of fatty acids, a method of usable organic carbon storage, in G. margarita while relying heavily on its AM fungi host to provide key nutrients suggesting that nutrient exchange is a two-way interaction. The AM fungi host relies on the plant host for its nutrients. Interactions between bacteria and fungi are based on benefits to metabolism and represent complex interactions between bacterial, fungal and plant components.

== Applications and significance ==
Many of the fungal partners involved in the endosymbiotic relationship with the bacteria are also in mutualistic or parasitic relationships with other plants. The presence of intracellular bacteria living within these fungi add another level of complexity and suggests that at some level, the plant is benefitting indirectly from the interaction between fungi and bacteria. About 80% of natural and cultivated plants harbour AM fungi. These interactions increase nutrient availability in the plant and lead to increased plant growth and environmental stress-resistance. There exists a current demand in agriculture to cultivate and optimize to increase yield sustainably. Without considering the bacteria that live within AM fungi, like Ca. G. sporarum, as a factor that may contribute the beneficial nature of AM fungi to plants, we may overlook what makes widespread agricultural application possible. On the other side of the spectrum are the fungi that cause disease in agricultural crops leading to huge loses, such as R. microsporus which causes blight in rice seedlings. R. microsporus relies on its bacterial partner of the Burkholderia sp. for the pathogenic toxin. Previous efforts to control infection included the use of harmful pesticides to eliminate the fungi, however more recent research takes into mind the role of the endosymbiotic bacteria in pathogenesis and uses phages to target the bacteria. We can see that fungal-bacterial endosymbiosis significantly impacts the global concern of food production and we can think of the deeper understanding of these relationships as being the solution to these problems.
