= Nitroplast =

- Black arrow: the nitroplast inside B. bigelowii (motile phase)

Scientific classification (Candidatus)
- Domain: Bacteria
- Kingdom: Bacillati
- Phylum: Cyanobacteriota
- Class: Cyanophyceae
- Order: Chroococcales
- Family: Aphanothecaceae
- Genus: Ca. Atelocyanobacterium
- Species: Ca. Atelocyanobacterium thalassa

Binomial name
- Candidatus Atelocyanobacterium thalassa Thompson et al., 2012

Synonyms
- UCYN-A; Nitroplast

Nitrogen-fixing organelle

A nitroplast is an organelle responsible for nitrogen-fixing. It arose as a cyanobacteria species living within the eukaryotic alga Braarudosphaera bigelowii. It is the first recorded example of such an organelle, designated in 2024.

The cyanobacterium is Candidatus Atelocyanobacterium thalassa, also referred to as UCYN-A, which exists exclusively as an obligate symbiont. Despite being found in measurable quantities throughout the world's oceans, A. thalassa is not known to be free-living in any environment. Unlike typical cyanobacteria, its genome has undergone massive reduction, losing the genes for RuBisCO, photosystem II, and the TCA cycle. Consequently, it possesses no independent means of fixing carbon or generating energy through photosynthesis, rendering it entirely dependent on its host (so far only known to be Braarudosphaera bigelowii and a closely-related unnamed species).

This partnership is characterized by a strict metabolic exchange: A. thalassa fixes atmospheric nitrogen into ammonium for the host, while the host provides the essential carbon products the bacterium can no longer produce for itself. While various sublineages are distributed across diverse marine niches—from oligotrophic open waters to coastal regions—every known lineage of A. thalassa remains confined within a host cell.

In the more integrated form, specifically the UCYN-A2 sublineage, the relationship with the alga has progressed so far that the bacterium is now considered to be a true organelle. (Note: Contrary to what the -plast suffix may imply, the organelle is not a derived form of a plastid.) In these cases, the "bacterium" is imported with nuclear-encoded proteins and its division is synchronized with the host, mirroring the evolutionary history of mitochondria and chloroplasts. This discovery of the first nitrogen-fixing organelle in a eukaryote has major implications for agricultural science, as it demonstrates a biological pathway for potentially engineering crops that do not require nitrogen fertilizer.

Members of A. thalassa are spheroid in shape and are 1–2 μm in diameter, and provide nitrogen to ocean regions by fixing non biologically available atmospheric nitrogen into biologically available ammonium that other marine microorganisms can use. There are many sublineages of A. thalassa that are distributed across a wide range of marine environments and host organisms. It appears that some sublineages of A. thalassa have a preference for oligotrophic ocean waters while other sublineages prefer coastal waters. Much is still unknown about all of A. thalassa's hosts and host preferences.

== Discovery ==
In 1998, Jonathan Zehr, an ocean ecologist at the University of California, Santa Cruz, and his colleagues found an unknown DNA sequence that appeared to be for an unknown nitrogen-fixing cyanobacterium in the Pacific Ocean, which they called UCYN-A (unicellular cyanobacterial group A). However, UCYN-A seemed to lack the genes needed for photosynthesis, among many others—representing a loss of around 80% of its original genome—that it requires for survival but cannot produce on its own.

At the same time, Kyoko Hagino, a paleontologist at Kochi University, was working to culture the host organism, B. bigelowii. Hagino's culturing work proved essential to provide the biological material needed to study the relationship between UCYN-A and B. bigelowii.

In 2024 Zehr's laboratory formally identified UCYN-A as a nitrogen-fixing organelle, which they termed the nitroplast. The team demonstrated that many of the proteins required for UCYN-A's own functions, which are absent from its genome, are now encoded in the host's DNA and imported into the organelle; this integration of host-encoded, organelle-targeted proteins is considered a defining hallmark of organelles, paralleling the evolutionary history of mitochondria and chloroplasts.

== Ecology ==
=== Nitrogen fixation ===
Nitrogen fixation, which is the reduction of N_{2} to biologically available nitrogen, is an important source of nitrogen for aquatic ecosystems. For many decades, N_{2} fixation was vastly underestimated. The assumption that N_{2} fixation only occurred via Trichodesmium and Richelia led to the conclusion that in the oceans, nitrogen output exceeded the input. However, researchers found that the nitrogenase complex has variable evolutionary histories. The use of the polymerase chain reaction (PCR), removed the requirement of cultivation or microscopy to identify N_{2} fixing microorganisms. As a result, marine N_{2}-fixing microorganisms other than Trichodesimum were found by sequencing PCR-amplified fragments of the gene nitrogenase (nifH). Nitrogenase is the enzyme that catalyzes nitrogen fixation, and studies have shown that nifH is widely distributed throughout the different parts of the ocean.

In 1989, the discovery of a short nifH gene sequence was published, and 15 years later it was revealed to be an unusual cyanobacterium that is widely distributed. The microbe was originally given the name UCYN-A for "unicellular cyanobacteria group A". In research published in 1998, nifH sequences were amplified directly from water collected in the Pacific and Atlantic Oceans, and shown to be from bacterial, unicellular cyanobacterial nifH, Trichodesmium and diatom symbionts. With the use of cultivation-independent PCR and quantitative PCR (qPCR) targeting the nifH gene, studies found that A. thalassa is distributed in many ocean regions, showing that the oceanic plankton contain a broader range of nitrogen-fixing microorganisms than was previously believed.

=== Habitat ===
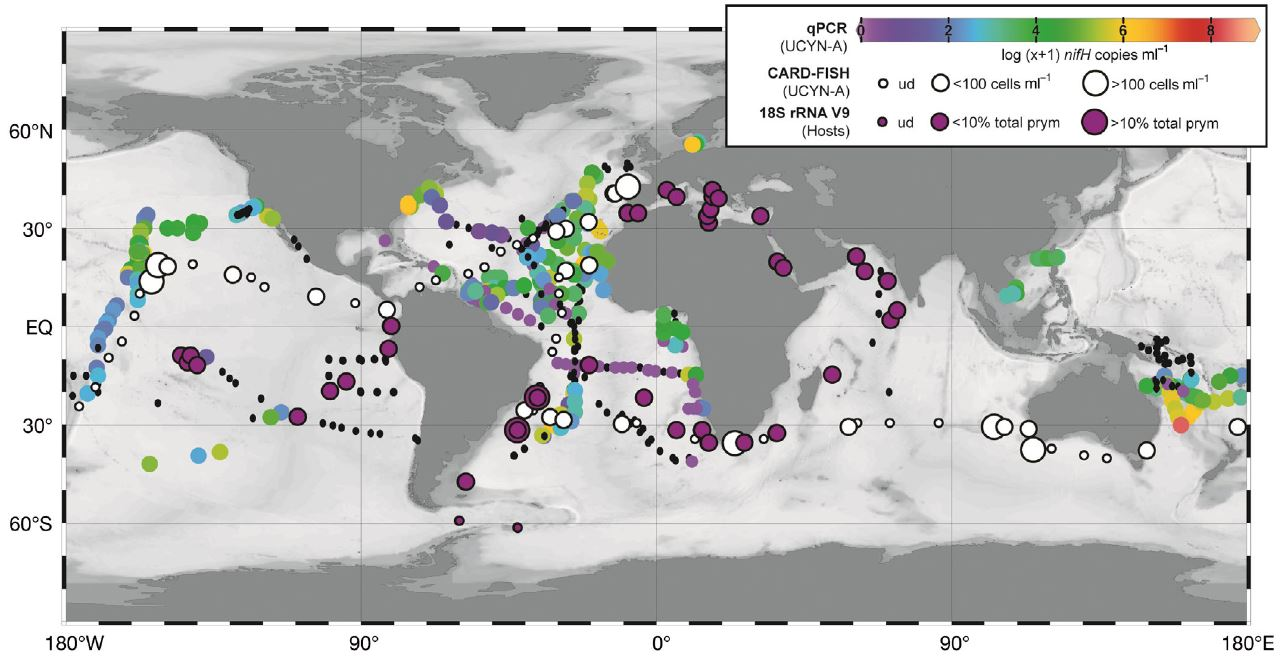
Global distribution of A. thalassa

The distribution of A. thalassa is cosmopolitan and is found throughout the world's oceans including the North Sea, Mediterranean Sea, Adriatic Sea, Red Sea, Arabian Sea, South China Sea, and the Coral Sea., further reinforcing its significant role in nitrogen fixation. Although A. thalassa is ubiquitous, its abundance is highly regulated by various abiotic factors such as temperature and nutrients. Studies have shown that it occupies cooler waters compared to other diazotrophs.

There are four main defined sublineages of A. thalassa, namely, UCYN-A1, UCYN-A2, UCYN-A3, and UCYN-A4 (see § Diversity below); studies have shown that these groups are adapted to different marine environments. UCYN-A1 and UCYN-A3 co-exist in open-ocean oligotrophic waters. while UCYN-A2 and UCYN-A4 co-exist in coastal waters. UCYN-A2 is typically found in high latitude temperate coastal waters. In addition, it can also be found co-occurring with UCYN-A4 in the coastal bodies of water. UCYN-A3 was found to be in greater abundance in the surface of the open ocean in the subtropics. In addition, UCYN-A3 has only been found to co-occur with UCYN-A1 thus far.

== Metabolism ==
=== Obligate photoheterotroph ===
Atelocyanobacterium thalassa is categorized as a photoheterotroph. Complete genome analysis reveals a reduced-size genome of 1.44 megabases and the lack of pathways needed for metabolic self-sufficiency common to cyanobacteria. Genes are lacking for photosystem II of the photosynthetic apparatus, RuBisCO (ribulose-1,5-bisphosphate carboxylase/oxygenase), and enzymes of the Calvin and tricarboxylic acid (TCA) cycle. Due to the lack of metabolically essential genes, A. thalassa requires external sources of carbon and other biosynthetic compounds. As well, A. thalassa lacks the tricarboxylic acid cycle but expresses a putative dicarboxylic-acid transporter. This suggests that A. thalassa fills its requirement for dicarboxylic acids from an external source. The complete or partial lack of biosynthetic enzymes required for valine, leucine, isoleucine, phenylalanine, tyrosine, and tryptophan biosynthesis further suggests the need for external sources of amino acids. However, A. thalassa still possesses the Fe-III transport genes (afuABC), which should allow for the transport of Fe-III into the cell.

=== Obligate symbiosis ===
Atelocyanobacterium thalassa is an obligate symbiote of the calcifying haptophyte alga Braarudosphaera bigelowii. Stable isotope experiments revealed that A. thalassa fixes ^{15}N_{2} and exchanges fixed nitrogen with the partner, while H^{13}CO_{3-} was fixed by B. bigelowii and exchanged to A. thalassa. A. thalassa receives ~16% of the total carbon of the symbiotic partner, and exchanges ~85–95% of total fixed nitrogen in return.

Atelocyanobacterium thalassa must live in close physical association with its metabolically dependent symbiosis partner. Atelocyanobacterium thalassa may be a true endosymbiont and fully enclosed within the host's cell membrane or has molecular mechanisms to allow for secure attachment and transfer of metabolites. This symbiotic connection must not allow the passage of oxygen while maintaining an exchange of fixed nitrogen and carbon. Such close symbiosis also requires signalling pathways between the partners and synchronized growth.

A stable co-culture of UCYN-A2 and its host was obtained and subjected to imaging studies. The UCYN-A2 "nitroplast" lineage imports a wide variety proteins from the host, triggered by a unique signal sequence, making it subject to tight control by the host cell. Its light-dark cycle is kept in sync with the host cell by host cryptochrome proteins. Several of its metabolic pathways are only complete with the help of host proteins.

=== Daytime N-fixation ===
Atelocyanobacterium thalassa is unicellular, hence it does not have specialized cellular compartments (heterocysts) to protect the nitrogenase (nifH) from oxygen exposure. Other nitrogen-fixing organisms employ temporal separation by fixing nitrogen only at night-time, however, A. thalassa has been found to express the nifH gene during the daylight. This is possible due to the absence of photosystem II and, therefore, oxygen and transcriptional control. It is hypothesized that the day-time nitrogen-fixation is more energy-efficient than night-time fixation common in other diazotrophs because light energy can be used directly for the energy-intensive nitrogen fixation.

== Life cycle ==
The lifecycle of A. thalassa is not well understood. As an obligate endosymbiont, A. thalassa is thought to be unable to survive outside of the host, suggesting its entire life cycle takes place inside of the host. The division and replication of A. thalassa are at least partially under the control of the host cell. It is thought that a signal transduction pathway exists to regulate the amount of A. thalassa cells within the host to ensure a sufficient amount of A. thalassa cells are supplied to the host's daughter cell during cell division.

UCYN-A2's cell division cadence is kept in sync with the host, like the mitochondria and the chloroplasts.

== Diversity ==
Genomic analysis of A. thalassa shows a wide variety of nifH gene sequences. Thus, this group of cyanobacteria can be divided into genetically distinct sublineages, four of which have been identified and defined. Sequences belonging to A. thalassa have been found in nearly all oceanic bodies.

=== Lineages ===
The lineages of A. thalassa are split by their determining oligotypes. There is a very high level of similarity between all sublineages in their amino-acid sequences, but some variance was found in their nifH sequences. The oligotypes of A. thalassa are based on its nitrogenase (nifH) sequences, and reveal thirteen positions of variance (entropy). The variances would cause different oligotypes/sublineages of A. thalassa to be found in different relative abundances and have different impacts on the ecosystems where they are found. Four main sublineages have been identified from oligotype analysis, and their respective oligotypes are: UCYN-A1/Oligo1, UCYN-A2/Oligo2, UCYN-A3/Oligo3, UCYN-A4/Oligo4. As many as 8 sublineages have been distinguished.

UCYN-A1 was the most abundant oligotype found across the oceans. The UCYN-A1 sublineage has an abundance of nitrogenase in a range of 104 – 107 copies of nifH per litre. UCYN-A1 and UCYN-A2 also have a significantly reduced genome size. UCYN-A2 differs from UCYN-A1 in that its oligo2 oligotyping has 10/13 differing positions of entropy from oligo1 (UCYN-A1). They also have different hosts. UCYN-A3 differs from UCYN-A1 with its oligo3 differing from oligo1 with an entropy position difference of 8/13. UCYN-A4 also differs from UCYN-A1 by 8/13 entropy positions in a different set.

A. thalassa lineages
Lineage	Environment	Hosts	Other traits	Genome?
UCYN-A1	Open ocean	Unnamed Chrysochromulina sp. (1–3 μm)		GCA_000025125.1 (full)
UCYN-A2	Coastal	B. bigelowii (4–10 μm)	Nitroplast	GCA_020885515.1 (full)
UCYN-A3	Open ocean	B. bigelowii		Unpublished (~13%)
UCYN-A4	Coastal	B. bigelowii genotype I	Nitroplast-like (possibly more derived than A2)	GCA_051971635.1 (near-full)

Oligotypes are used because nifH is more easily detected in an intact form environmental samples compared to full metagenomes that require a larger amount of samples as well as sequencing work. Where available, however, full genomes are able to show more information. Complete genomes of the A1 and A2 sublineages, combined with a molecular clock approach, show that the two lineages diverged in the late Cretaceous (~90 million years ago), corroborated by fossil records of B. bigelowii going back about 100 million years. These lineages have likely co-evolved with their hosts.

As of GTDB Release 10-RS226 (April 2025), the NCBI GenBank contains 8 A. thalassa genomes of sufficient quality and completeness for analysis. GTDB assigns UCYN-A1 (GCA_000025125.1 + 5 others) and UCYN-A2 (GCA_020885515.1 + 1 other) to two separate species-level clusters.

=== Phylogeny ===
Cornejo-Castillo et al, 2019. nifH, maximum likelihood. Taxonomy corrected per NCBI and GTDB where applicable.

- - - - UCYN-A1
      - UCYN-A2
    - UCYN-A3
  - UCYN-A4
- - Gloeothece sp. K068DGA
  - - endosymbiont of Rhopalodia gibba (see Epithemia § Endosymbiosis, under GTDB genus Rippkaea)
    - - Crocosphaera chwakensis CCY0110
      - Crocosphaera subtropica ATCC 51142
- - - Rippkaea orientalis PCC 8001, PCC 8002
    - Synechococcus sp. RF-1
  - - - Gloeothece verrucosa PCC 7822
      - Gloeothece citriformis PCC 7424
    - - - Lyngbya aestuarii PCC 8106
        - Lyngbya majuscula CCAP 1446/4
      - Crocosphaera watsonii WH 8501, WH 0003

Cornejo-Castillo et al, 2019. Phylogenomic (165 protein-coding sequences), maximum likelihood. Taxonomy corrected per NCBI and GTDB where applicable.

- - - Gloeothece verrucosa PCC 7822
    - Gloeothece citriformis PCC 7424
  - - - Rippkaea orientalis PCC 8001, PCC 8002
      - endosymbiont of Rhopalodia gibba
    - - Crocosphaera subtropica ATCC 51142
      - - UCYN-A1
        - - UCYN-A2
          - UCYN-A3
- Pleurocapsa sp. PCC 7327

The phylogenomic result is considered more representative of the life-history of organisms than the single-locus nifH result.

== Genome evolution ==
As other endosymbiotic organelles, nitroplast genome lost many genes and many essential biosynthetic pathways of them should be supported by the proteins produced in the nucleus.

After analyzing the genome and proteome in the nitroplast, scientists found that three types of proteins coexist in nitoplast, UCYN-1 encoded proteins, B. bigelowii encoded proteins (nucleus encoded), and the proteins encoded by both ("redundancies").

Each B. bigelowii encoded protein contains a special sequence named uTP (UCYN transition peptide), an extension at 3′ end of functional regions, which make them much longer than orthologous proteins found in other species. The uTP sequences assist the transition of proteins from nucleus to nitroplast. Actually, some B. bigelowii encoded proteins were not detected in nitroplast, but the existence of uTP sequence suggested that they might be transported into nitroplast.

Some proteins, like PyrC in the pyrimidine biosynthesis pathway, are produced in both nucleus and nitroplast. The scientists said that such redundancies might be the key reason why UCYN-1 lost genes faster than chromatophore in Paulinella, whose endosymbiosis event happened in similar time.

== Implications ==
The discovery of nitroplasts challenges previous notions about the exclusivity of nitrogen fixation to prokaryotic organisms. Understanding the structure and function of nitroplasts opens up possibilities for genetic engineering in plants. By incorporating genes responsible for nitroplast function, researchers aim to develop crops capable of fixing their own nitrogen, potentially reducing the need for nitrogen-based fertilizers and mitigating environmental damage.
