= Glomeribacter gigasporarum =

"Candidatus Glomeribacter gigasporarum"

Scientific classification (Candidatus)
- Domain: Bacteria
- Kingdom: Pseudomonadati
- Phylum: Pseudomonadota
- Class: Betaproteobacteria
- Genus: "Candidatus Glomeribacter"
- Species: "Ca. G. gigasporarum"

Binomial name
- "Candidatus Glomeribacter gigasporarum" Bianciotto et al 2003

Species of bacterium

Candidatus Glomeribacter gigasporarum is a gram-negative β-proteobacteria. The bacterium is rod-shaped, and has a obligate endosymbiotic relationship with the arbuscular-mycorrhizal fungi Gigaspora margarita. Sequencing of the16S rRNA gene places Ca. G. gigasporarum within the Burkholderia genus. Ca. G. gigasporarum is unculturable as of yet, but can stay alive in enrichment for up to 4 weeks. The candidate bacteria is considered "the smallest beta-proteobacterium" with a genome size of 1.4 Mb. The chromosome is 750 kb long and a plasmid is 600 to 650 kb. The genome size was determined using gel-electrophoresis.

== Symbiotic relationship ==
The relationship between Ca. G. gigasporarum and the fungi Gigaspora margarita is obligate endosymbiotic. This occurs when either the symbiont or the host cannot live without each other. In this case the bacteria cannot live without the fungi. In certain studies, it has been found that over multiple generations of cloning certain spores of G. margarita contain no bacteria. It was also found that these spores that lacked the bacteria had several different physiological changes in spore diameter, nuclear diameter, and wall thickness. The fungi root system did not grow as abundant and changes in cell structure occurred in the fungi without bacteria. The fungi were able to grow and complete their life cycle supporting that they can live without the symbiotic bacteria inside of them. Since Ca. G. gigasporarum has only been found inside the fungi, it is the current idea that it cannot live by itself.
