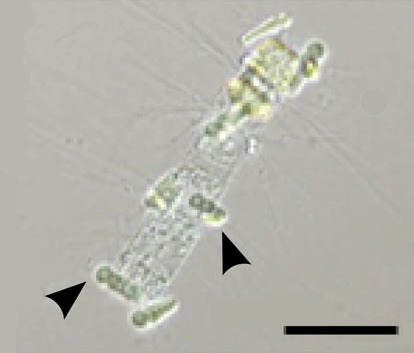
- Bright-field microscopy image of epiphytic cyanobacterial symbiont Richelia rhizosoleniae SC01 9 (indicated by arrows) attached to a host diatom Chaetoceros sp. (c). Scale bar, 50 μm.

Scientific classification
- Domain: Bacteria
- Kingdom: Bacillati
- Phylum: Cyanobacteriota
- Class: Cyanophyceae
- Order: Nostocales
- Family: Nostocaceae
- Genus: Richelia; J.Schmidt, 1901

Species
- Richelia intracellularis C.H.Ostenfeld ex J.Schmidt, 1901; Richelia sinica Shen and Li 1989 (recommended for removal); Non-LPSN: Richelia rhizosoleniae (Lemmermann 1899) Foster et al., 2022; "Ca. Richelia exalis Delmont et al., 2021; Richelia euintracellularis Foster et al., 2022

= Richelia =

Genus of bacteria

Richelia is a genus of nitrogen-fixing, filamentous, heterocystous and cyanobacteria. They exist as both free-living organisms as well as symbionts within potentially up to 13 diatoms distributed throughout the global ocean. As a symbiont, Richelia can associate epiphytically and as endosymbionts within the periplasmic space between the cell membrane and cell wall of diatoms.

Richelia has been divided into several species on a genomic basis. Despite not being recognized by the LPSN, they remain useful in talking about the differences in genomic content and lifestyle of the groups they refer to.

== Morphology ==
Richelia are made up of filaments called trichomes, which are fine hair-like structures that grow out of a myriad of plant species, though their presence as free-living organisms in the marine environment is rare. The number of trichomes Richelia have in each diatom host varies. The trichomes serve the purpose of nitrogen fixation as well as nutrient exchange with host diatoms. The location of Richelia within their various diatom symbionts is not fully known, though it is commonly assumed to be within the diatom's periplasmic space between the plasmalemma and the frustule.

Richelia's trichomes are made up of two cell types: heterocyst and vegetative. The heterocyst is a terminal single cell within which nitrogen fixation occurs, while the rest of the trichome is made up of vegetative cells within which photosynthesis occurs. Some Richelia are made up of many vegetative cells and a terminal heterocyst, while others only contain a terminal heterocyst. The heterocyst is characterized by a thick glycolipid layer which minimizes oxygen's ability to interfere with nitrogen fixation. This is important to Richelia's function as oxygen can bind to nitrogenase and inhibit the cyanobacteria's nitrogen fixing abilities. The heterocyst does not divide, while the vegetative cells do. Richelia also remain photosynthetically active while within their host diatoms, a behaviour that is somewhat uncommon for similar symbionts.

== Symbiosis ==
=== Nitrogen fixation and symbiosis ===
Nitrogen fixation is an important biological process in marine ecosystems. In many regions of the world's oceans the availability of inorganic nitrogen such as nitrate and ammonium limits the rate of photosynthesis (primary productivity). Hence, organisms that form symbiotic relationships with other organisms, often cyanobacteria, to fix nitrogen can be at an advantage. In many cyanobacteria, nitrogen fixation is carried out in specialized cells called heterocysts. Cyanobacteria in the genus Richelia are an example of cyanobacteria are capable of fixing nitrogen gas into organic forms of nitrogen. The organic nitrogen can then be transferred from the cyanobacteria to the diatoms with which they have a symbiotic relationship. Evidence of this nitrogen transfer has been observed multiple times, and this relationship has benefits for both the Richelia cells, which exist inside the diatom, and the diatom itself. For example, the growth of cyanobacteria inside the diatom is increased as they receive fixed carbon from the host (about a quarter of the host's carbon-fixation capacity). The diatom benefits from enhanced growth as a result of the nitrogen fixed by the cyanobacteria. The presence of this mutualism can allow diatoms to persist through nitrogen limiting conditions.

=== Host specificity ===
Richelia's host specificity and location within a host has been linked to the symbiont genome evolution. Even for taxonomically and morphologically related organisms, preference for diatom hosts and locations within a host differ. These differences usually depend on which host a symbiont typically resides in. For example, in the Hemiaulus and Richelia symbiosis, Richelia resides inside the siliceous frustule of Hemiaulus. Richelia lacks principal nitrogen metabolism enzymes and transporters, such as ammonium transporters, nitrate and nitrite reductases as well as glutamate synthase. It also has a reduced genome, likely following the genome streamlining theory. Hemiaulus has genes that code for all of these enzymes and transporters while lacking the nitrogen fixation genes present in Richelia. This allows the host to complement its symbiont and vice versa, resulting in host specificity that follows host and symbiont genome evolution.

=== Coordination of gene expression ===
Day-night cycles potentially play a role in coordination of resource exchange and cell division between a diazotroph and its diatom host. Photosynthesis, nitrogen fixation, and resource acquisition related genes show day-night fluctuations in their expression pattern in Richelia. Nitrogen uptake, metabolism, and carbon transport gene expression in diatom hosts seem to be synchronized with nitrogen fixation gene expression in Richelia, suggesting a coordinated exchange of nitrogen and carbon. Symbiont-host cell physiology is thought to be coordinated and strongly dependent on each other, especially with regard to the time of the day.

== Taxonomy ==
The genus name of Richelia is in honour of Andreas du Plessis de Richelieu (1852–1932), who was a Danish naval officer and businessman who became a Siamese admiral and minister of the Royal Thai Navy.

The genus was circumscribed by Ernst Johannes Schmidt in Vidensk. Meddel. Dansk Naturhist. Foren. Kjøbenhavn 1901 on pages 146 and 149 in 1901.

=== Species associations ===
While studies have identified Richelia in up to 13 species, there is a debate as to how many of those identifications were accurate.

The diatom-Richelia symbiotic relationships that are confirmed and most well-known are as follows:

- R. euintracellularis lives in association with Hemiaulus. It is believed to live inside the plasma membrane, a true endobiont. It has the most reduced genome of all Richelia. Hemiaulus-Richelia symbiosis is often associated with Trichodesmium, especially in transitional waters.
- R. intracellularis lives in association with Rhizosolenia. It is located outside the plasma membrane in the periplasmic space It has a genome with a moderate amount of reduction.
- R. rhizosoleniae is associated with mainly Chaetoceros, being attached to their spines, i.e. outside of the cell wall. Its genome is mostly intact with the ability to live freely, being especially prone to do so when nitrogen is sufficient.

== Life cycle ==
=== Within diatom hosts ===
Richelia are most commonly found and best understood within host diatoms. For most of its life cycle within diatoms, the orientation of Richelia cells remains unchanged with the orientation of the terminal heterocyst cell fixed towards the closest diatom valve. This orientation only changes during separation and migration of the Richelia trichomes. This separation and migration is presumed to occur synchronously with growth and division of the host diatom as it produces daughter cells, in order to provide new daughter cells with symbionts. While transfer of the Richelia trichome to daughter cells can occur before division, this method will eventually end as it limits vegetative growth due to the progressive reduction in the size of the host diatom. Within diatoms that are dead or dying, some Richelia cells have enlarged and rounded vegetative cells, some begin to disintegrate and die with their host, and some emerge from a trichome-shaped opening in the diatom frustule and presumably become free-living Richelia .

=== Free-living ===
While Richelia cells can exist as free-living organisms in the marine environment, it is rarely observed. Additionally, how diatoms without symbionts are colonized by free-living Richelia is unknown; however, a number of mechanisms have been hypothesized, including Richelia cells entering non-colonized diatoms directly. Also hypothesized is that Richelia cells may be affiliated with auxospore cells, or may enter diatoms during sexual reproduction when the trichome is transported to the auxospore. Richelia cells may also colonize diatoms during instances of vegetative cell enlargement.

== Distribution ==
Cyanobacteria in the genus Richelia are primarily found in symbiotic association with diatoms in nitrogen-limited regions of the ocean. This distribution pattern is attributed to the symbiotic relationship that Richelia forms with different species of diatoms in which they provide diatoms with nitrogen that is otherwise limiting for growth. Similar to other diazotrophs, Richelia cells are in low abundances in productive equatorial regions due to nutrient upwelling and in high abundances in non-productive subtropical areas where low concentrations of nitrate limit the growth of diatoms.

Quantitative analyses of the distribution of Richelia is an emerging field of study. Thus far, many observations have been subject to criticism due to issues of misidentifying hosts and the associated diazotrophs, and demonstrating symbiotic relationships overall.

=== Global ocean ===
Richelia are found throughout the Pacific Ocean, the Atlantic Ocean, the Amazon River plume, and the Mediterranean Sea. They follow similar distributions to other diazotrophs including cyanobacteria in the genus Trichodesmium, Candidatus Atelocyanobacterium thalassa (formerly known as UCYN-A), and UCYN-B, which are in high abundance throughout much of the tropical oceans, although the relative abundances of the different taxa varies. The abundance of Richelia cells also varies based on different environmental conditions across regions. Richelia, when compared to other diazotrophs, show lower abundances at deeper depths. Warm, silicate-rich conditions, such as those found in the Amazon River plume, allow for high Richelia growth rates. Richelia cells also decrease in abundance as inorganic nitrogen increases because they are at a competitive disadvantage when nitrate concentrations are high. However, unlike other diazotrophs, Richelia cells do not decrease in abundance when phosphate levels are high. The abundances of Richelia cells also depend on the availability of iron, due to the iron requirements of the enzyme nitrogenase that is needed to fix di-nitrogen gas. Grazing is also a factor that may affect the abundances of diazotrophs throughout different regions in the global ocean.

=== Mediterranean Sea ===
Richelia is an endosymbiont with diatoms such as Rhizosolenia spp. and Hemiaulus spp. Richelia is found to be highly correlated with the presence of Hemiaulus spp., and sporadically correlated with the presence of Rhizosolenia spp. The highest counts of Richelia as sampled in 2006 in the Eastern Mediterranean Sea are 50 heterocysts L^{−1} in June and October in coastal regions, and 50 heterocysts L^{−1} in June and November in pelagic regions. These peaks occur during a deepening of the mixed layer depth at each region. Richelia and Hemiaulus hauckii are found together in both coastal and pelagic regions year-round in diurnal and nocturnal sampling, and it is suggested that this symbiotic pair has an evolutionary advantage over other host options for Richelia. Because the Eastern Mediterranean Sea has oligotrophic conditions due to a large transport of nutrients out to the North Atlantic Ocean through the Strait of Gibraltar, Richelia provides important nitrogen fixation capabilities for diatoms they form symbiotic relationships with. Free living Richelia are not considered to be present in the Eastern Mediterranean Sea based on the current sampling experiment results available. In the Eastern Mediterranean Sea water columns, Richelia is the primary diurnal organism with an expression of the nifH gene. A case of allopatric speciation is observed between coastal and pelagic water columns in the Eastern Mediterranean Sea. These two regions have different clades of nifH-expressing cells of Richelia, hypothesized to be due to the restriction of the two regions from each other by a hydrological barrier caused by the sloping of the continental shelf.

=== Western/Southwestern Pacific Ocean ===
Richelia have been found as epiphytes to Chaetoceros compressus and to Rhizosolenia clevei in the Western Pacific Ocean. It is hypothesized that Richelia filaments can detach from Rhizosolenia clevei and subsequently become symbionts to Chaetoceros compressus. This is suggested as the Richelia and Chaetoceros compressus symbiosis has been found to follow occurrences of the Richelia and Rhizosolenia clevei symbiosis.

==== Kuroshio Current ====
The distribution of Richelia in the Kuroshio Current varies based on the section of the current and the time of year. Physical and hydrographical conditions vary throughout the year in the current and create changes to the growth of bacterial and diatom colonies. Conditions in May limit growth to a more narrow region of the current than in July. The region has low concentrations of nitrate throughout both Spring and Summer, with July seeing the least nitrate levels in surface waters. The number of Richelia filaments per colony of Chaetoceros compressus ranges from 4 to 9 during May to November, reaching a maximum in July. The maximum abundance of the Richelia and Chaetoceros compressus symbiosis occurs in July, at 10 colonies L^{−1}. The maximum abundance of the Richelia and Rhizosolenia clevei symbiosis also occurs in July, at 30 colonies L^{−1}.

==== Sulu Sea ====
Symbiosis between Richelia and Chaetoceros compressus has also been observed in the Southern Sulu Sea. This is due to the lower than 0.1 μM nitrogen concentrations in surface waters causing nitrogen limiting conditions.

=== Indian Ocean ===
Richelia have been found as epiphytes to Chaetoceros compressus in the Indian Ocean.

=== Western Tropical Atlantic Ocean ===
Nitrogen fixation and cyanobacteria-diatom symbiosis occur in the freshwater layer of the Amazon River plume due to low surface nitrate conditions. In these nitrogen limited areas, Richelia can be found in symbiosis with Rhizosolenia clevei and Hemiaulus spp. Richelia symbiosis with H. hauckii is found predominantly in this region with depth as well as throughout the surface. The abundance of the symbiosis between Richelia and H. hauckii is higher further northwest from the Amazon River outflow. A positive correlation can be found between salinity and abundances of Richelia symbioses.
