= Auxospore =

Stage in the lifecycle of diatoms

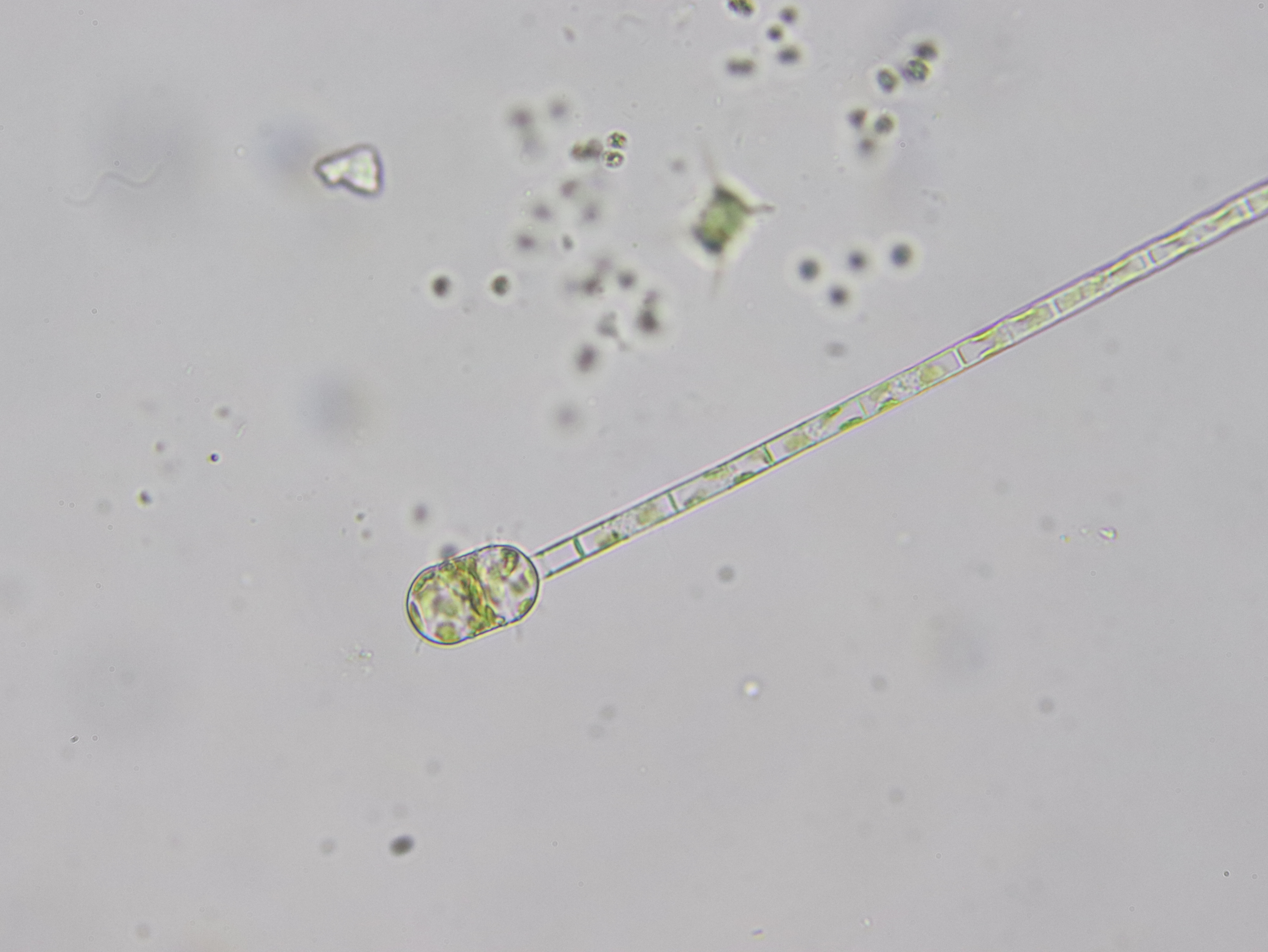
Filament of Aulacoseira, with an auxospore at the end

Auxospores are specialised cells in diatoms that are produced at key stages in their cell cycle or life history. Auxospores typically play a role in growth processes, sexual reproduction or dormancy.

== Mechanism ==
Auxospores are involved in re-establishing the normal size in diatoms, as successive mitotic cell divisions leads to a decrease in cell size. This occurs because each daughter cell produced by cell division inherits one of the two valves that make up the frustule (a silica cell wall), and then grows a smaller valve within it. Consequently, each division cycle decreases the average size of diatom cells in a population. When its size becomes too small, a dividing diatom cell produces an auxospore to expand its cell size back to that which is normal for vegetative cells.

Auxospores can also play a role in sexual reproduction in diatoms, and may be formed after haploid gametes fuse to form a diploid zygote.

Finally, auxospores can be produced by diatoms to act as dormant stages, sometimes referred to as "resting spores." These are used to survive periods of time that are unfavourable to growth, such as the low-light period of winter or while nutrients are depleted.

== Structure ==
The auxospore is covered by a flexible cell wall called perizonium, which replace the thin zygotic membrane when the auxospore originates from a zygote, and doesn't restrict cell growth. A few species don't form a perizonium, and has a wall of scales and imperforate silica instead. Usually the auxospore is photosynthetic and depends on light to grow, but with sufficient accumulated storage material before its formation, it can be formed without any further supply of energy. After maximal size has been reached, a new diatom with a rigid frustule, a so-called initial cell that is significally larger than its parent cells, is formed inside the auxospore which it eventually breaks free from.
