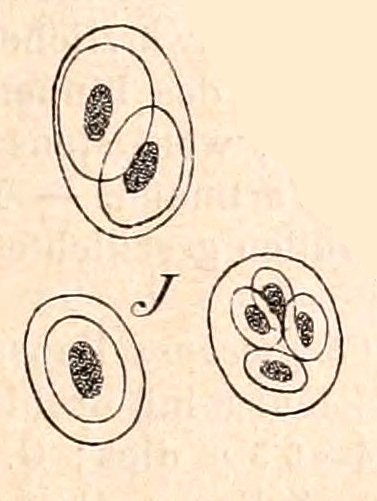
- Gloeothece confluens Näg.

Scientific classification
- Domain: Bacteria
- Kingdom: Bacillati
- Phylum: Cyanobacteriota
- Class: Cyanophyceae
- Order: Chroococcales
- Family: Aphanothecaceae
- Genus: Gloeothece; C.Nägeli

= Gloeothece =

Genus of cyanobacteria

Gloeothece is a genus of cyanobacteria belonging to the family Aphanothecaceae. The genus was circumscribed by Carl Nägeli in 1849. It has a cosmopolitan distribution.

== Species ==
- Gloeothece confluens Nägeli
- Gloeothece palea (Kützing) Nägeli
- Gloeothece rupestris (Lyngbye) Bornet
