= Rippkaea =

Scientific classification
- Domain: Bacteria
- Kingdom: Bacillati
- Phylum: Cyanobacteriota
- Class: Cyanophyceae
- Order: Chroococcales
- Family: Aphanothecaceae
- Genus: Rippkaea; J.R.Johansen & Mareš 2019

Species
- R. orientalis J.R.Johansen & Mareš 2019 (type species); (see text)

Synonyms
- None Species synonyms: R. orientalis; Cyanothece PCC 8801 = Synechococcus sp. Rf-1; Cyanothece PCC 8802

Genus of cyanobacteria

Rippkaea is a genus of unicellular cyanobacteria in the family Microcystaceae or Aphanothecaceae. The genus was circumscribed in 2019 by J.R. Johansen and Mareš, with Rippkaea orientalis as the type species. Prior to that the genus was treated as Cyanothece or Synechococcus on morphological grounds, which has proven inadequate in light of molecular data.

== Etymology ==
The genus name Rippkaea is in honour of Rosmarie Rippka, "a prominent cyanobacterial researcher who ushered in the period of using strains to study cyanobacteria".

== Description ==
The two PCC strains are free-living, unicellular cyanobacteria isolated from rice fields in Taiwan. Cells are oval to circuclar and divide by simple binary fission. Thyalkoids are arranged in parallel bundles crossing the entire cell. Formation of mucilaginous colonies is only occasional.

The genus is able to fix nitrogen. It has a circadian rhythm governing photosynthesis, nitrogenase activity, and animo acid uptake.

=== Endosymbiosis ===
This genus (sensu GTDB) includes a number of diazoplasts, the intracellular nitrogen-fixing endosymbionts of certain Epithemia diatoms. These endosymbionts have lost the ability to photosynthesize, relying on their host for organic carbon, while providing fixed nitrogen in return.

== Phylogeny ==
Phylogeny per GTDB Release 10-RS226 (April 2025). Provisional names are preserved.

Mapping from provisional names of diazoplasts to published names of Epithemia hosts is obtained as follows: the associated NCBI genome assembly records is queried based on the GTDB genome IDs (e.g. GCF_003574135.1) and the host species name is found from the linked publication or BioSample metadata.

- 99
  - 100
    - 80
      - 100
        - Crocosphaera
        - Atelocyanobacterium
      - JBCDDV01 sp039180145
    - UHCC-0190
  - Aphanothece_B sacrum
- Rippkaea 100
  - 100
    - Diazoplasts 100
      - 99
        - 70
          - R. sp000829235
            E. turgida symbioant
          - R. sp003574135
            E. gibberula symbioant
        - R. sp029919255
          E. clementina symbioant
      - R. sp947331815
        E. pelagica symbioant
    - R. sp002110465
  - 100
    - R. orientalis
    - R. sp003448685
