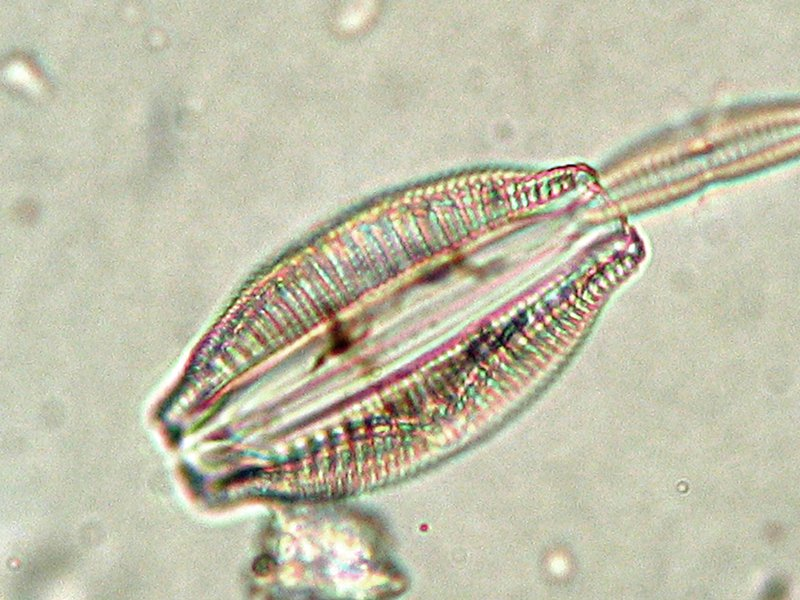
- Epithemia sorex

Scientific classification
- Domain: Eukaryota
- Supergroup: Stramenopiles
- Division: Ochrophyta
- Clade: Bacillariophyta
- Class: Bacillariophyceae
- Order: Surirellales
- Family: Surirellaceae
- Genus: Epithemia; F. T. Kützing, 1844

Synonyms
- Rhopalodia O. Müller, 1895; Tetralunata Hamsher, Graeff, Stepanek & Kociolek, 2014

= Epithemia =

Genus of algae

Epithemia is a genus of diatoms belonging to the family Rhopalodiaceae. Species in this genus have a cosmopolitan distribution and are found in freshwater and marine ecosystems. Recent studies have proposed that the genus Rhopalodia should be merged into Epithemia based on phylogenetic evidence, although this taxonomic change has been disputed or ignored.

Members of this genus have endosymbionts that fix nitrogen, called spheroid bodies, that are derived from cyanobacteria. Because of their nitrogen-fixing endosymbionts, they may serve as indicators of eutrophication, because Epithemia abundance decreases with increased ambient inorganic N concentrations.

== Endosymbiosis ==
Epithemia and Rhopalodia, two (or one) genera of rhopalodiacean diatoms, have nitrogen-fixing endosymbionts called spheroid bodies (SBs) or diazoplasts (Note: Contrary to what the -plast suffix may imply, these organelles are not derived from the original plastid.) in addition to the regular chloroplast and mitochondria. The relationship between Epithemia and spheroid bodies is estimated to have begun at least 35 million years ago based on fossil records. They are cyanobacteria that have undergone various degrees of gene loss in adaptation to their new dependent lifestyle. The SB of E. turgida has undergone more rapid evolution and more gene loss compared to the SB of E. gibberula.

The diazoplasts have lost most genes involved in photosynthesis. They have complete OPP, C3 glycolysis, AA synthesis, and glycogen utilization pathways, but their C6 glycolysis and TCA cycles are interrupted by gene deletions. They retain thylakoid membranes. They perform nitrogen fixation during both day and night, relying on the catabolism of host-provided C3 and C6 sugars.

Unlike other organelles (including the relatively recent cases of nitroplasts), the diazoplasts do not have a high degree of functional gene transfer to the host's nuclear genome and has minimal reliance on host-imported proteins. Nevertheless, they display typical organelle traits of metabolic dependence on the host and coordinated division. This arrangement may suggest a possible route for engineering nitrogen fixation into crops.

=== Relatives ===
The closest relatives of the SBs are within the family Aphanothecaceae. The closest known relatives of the SBs are the unnamed unicellular cyanobacterium SU2 and Rippkaea orientalis PCC 8801. The SBs are closely related to the nitroplasts, which had entered into a separate endosymbiosis with Braarudosphaera bigelowii about 90 million years ago.

GTDB annotates the SB of E. gibberula as Rippkaea sp003574135, a species-level cluster bearing a placeholder name. Additional assignments include Ri. sp000829235 for the E. turgida SB, Ri. sp029919255 for the E. clementina SB, and Ri. sp947331815 for the E. pelagica SB. (Note: Mapping from provisional names of diazoplasts to published names of Epithemia hosts is obtained as follows: the associated NCBI genome assembly records is queried based on the GTDB genome IDs (e.g. GCF_003574135.1) and the host species name is found from the linked publication or BioSample metadata.)

== Species ==
Those marked with an asterisk, *, were previously in the genus Rhopalodia.

- Epithemia adnata (Kützing) Brébisson, 1838
- Epithemia alpestris Kützing, 1844
- Epithemia alpestris W.Smith, 1853
- Epithemia anasthasiae Pantocsek, 1902
- Epithemia argus (Ehrenberg) Kützing 1844
- Epithemia catenata
- Epithemia constricta W. Smith (Krammer)*
- Epithemia gibba Kützing, 1844*
- Epithemia gibberula Kützing, 1844*
- Epithemia musculus Kützing, 1844*
- Epithemia pelagica
- Epithemia reicheltii Schmidt et al. 1904
- Epithemia smithii Carruthers 1864
- Epithemia sorex Kützing, 1844
- Epithemia turgida Kützing, 1844

== Phylogeny ==
Phylogeny of Epithemia
Source	Ruck et al. (2016)	Moulin et al. (2024)
Sequence data	rbcL-psbC-cob-rDNA	18S rDNA-psbC-rbcL
Method	Four MrBayes runs, majority rule	Unknown
Phylogram	Auricula; - Protokeelia bassonii; (1); - Rhopalodia sp.; - Rhopalodia sp.; Rhopalodia cf. musculus; - - Rhopalodia iriomotensis; Rhopalodia operculata; (2); (3); - Epithemia sorex (Note: Has diazoplast. NCBI txid 2841584 (adnata), 2809052 (catenata), 3034674 (clementina), 2809053 (pelagica), 718215 (sorex), 718217 (turgida), 3418554 (fuxianensis), 309035 (gibba), 1763363 (gibberula), 3418553 (inflata), 3455944 (musculus), 3420184 (sterrenbergii), 3418552 (yunnanensis).); Epithemia argus; - Epithemia hyndmannii; - Epithemia sp.; Epithemia turgida; (4); - Rhopalodia cf. gibba; Rhopalodia gibba; - Rhopalodia contorta; - Rhopalodia sp.; Rhopalodia parallela; Coronia, Petrodictyon, Surirella, Iconella	Thalassiophysa hyalina 4vi08 1C1; - Protokeelia bassonii 3564 A20; 95; Auricula complexa 26vi08 1J 1; 99 (1); 100; 100; Epithemia catenata UHM3210; Rhopalodia sp. 13vi08 2B GCCT21; Rhopalodia sp. 3825 12; 91; 40; 41; 75; Epithemia clementina; Epithemia iriomotensis 28vi08 1C 1; Rhopalodia sp. 9vi08 1F 2; Epithemia pelagica UHM3202; 100 (2); 100 (3); 100; Epithemia argus CH211; Epithemia sorex CH148; 100; Epithemia hyndmannii LO320; 100; Epithemia turgida CH154; Epithemia turgida CYTX021; 100 (4); 95; Rhopalodia cf. gibba nycRhop; 100; Rhopalodia gibba CYTX022; Rhopalodia gibba L924; 67; 51; Rhopalodia contorta L1299; Rhopalodia gibba CH155; 100; Epithemia parallela L1370; Epithemia parallela N09 43 rhop2 3

Key to clade labels:

1. Epithemia s.l. (post-merge sensu Ruck et al. 2016). Also the last common ancestor node of all diazoplast-carrying species.
2. Freshwater clade
3. Traditional Epithemia s.s.
4. Freshwater Rhopalodia

What is traditionally known as Rhopalodia is paraphyletic to Epithemia. A merge is performed by Ruck et al. (2016) to maintain monophyly. An alternative would be to constrict Rhopalodia to the freshwater clade (which includes the type species R. gigga), moving the grade of "marine Rhopalodia" to incertae sedis. In this new view, Rhopalodia sensu stricto would be sister to Epithemia.

Traditional (pre-merge) Epithemia is sister to Tetralunata, according to the scientists who proposed Tetralunata. Larger (post-merge) Epithemia is sister to Protokeelia, based on the only species sampled in Ruck et al. (2016), Protokeelia bassonii. There is considerable uncertainty regarding the placement of Auricula.
