= Endosymbiont =

Organism that lives within the body or cells of another organism

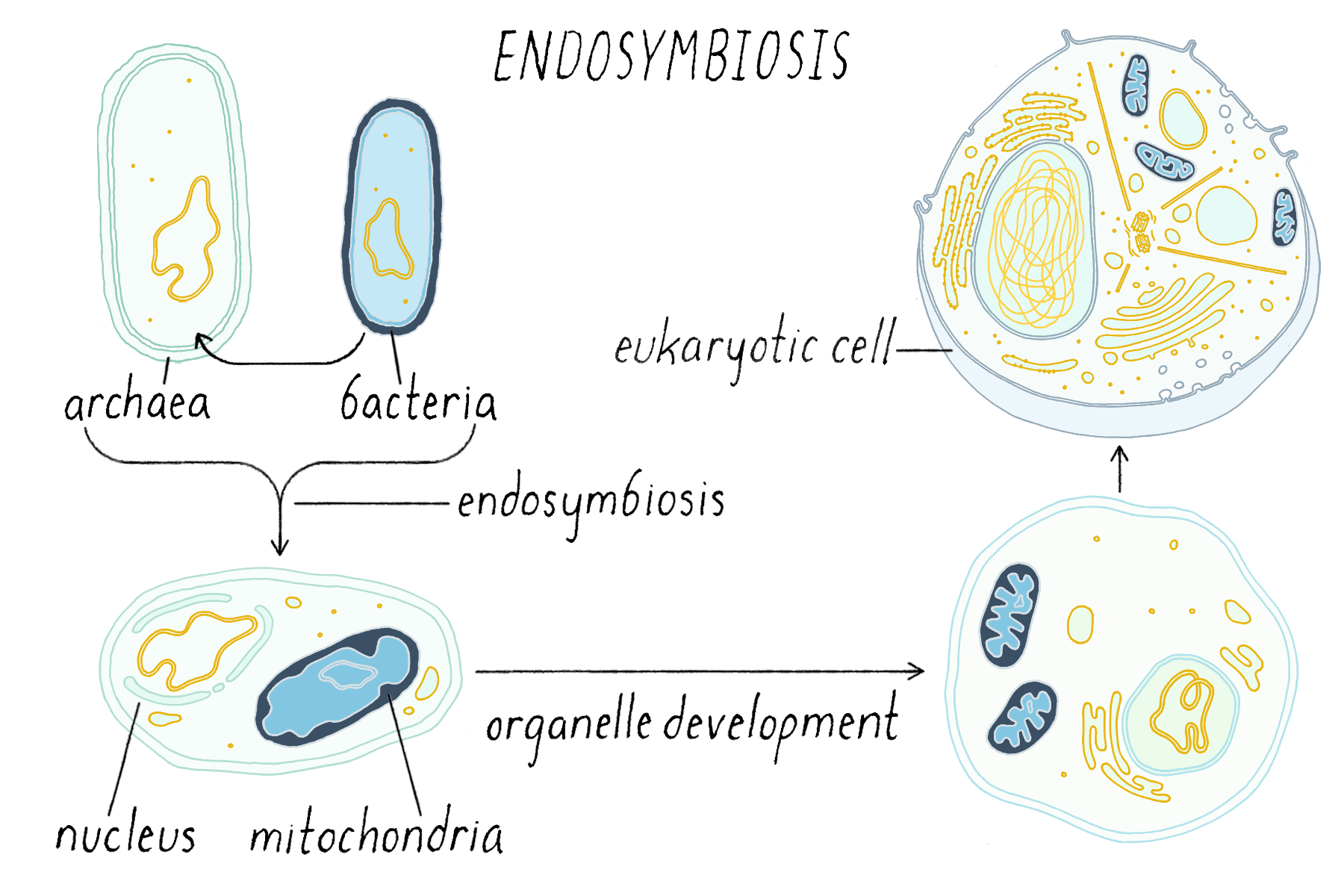
An endosymbiont is an organism that lives inside other cells, usually providing benefits to both organisms.

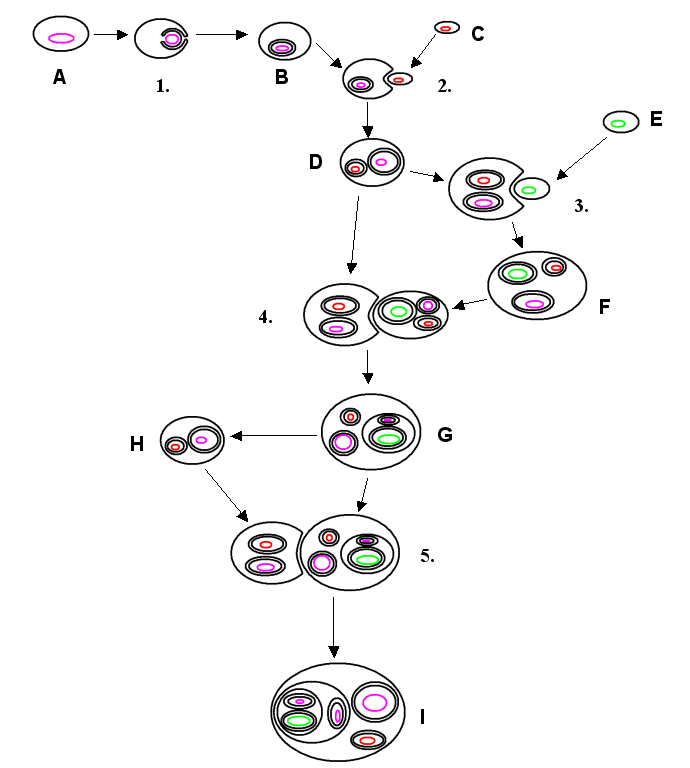
A representation of the endosymbiotic theory

An endosymbiont or endobiont is an organism that lives within the body or cells of another organism. Typically, the two organisms are in a mutualistic relationship. Examples are nitrogen-fixing bacteria (called rhizobia), which live in the root nodules of legumes, single-cell algae inside reef-building corals, and bacterial endosymbionts that provide essential nutrients to insects.

According to the theory of symbiogenesis, endosymbiosis played key roles in the development of eukaryotes. Roughly 2.3 billion years ago an archaeon (likely within the "Asgard" superphylum) absorbed an alphaproteobacterium through phagocytosis, that eventually became the mitochondria that provide energy to almost all living eukaryotic cells. Approximately 1 billion years ago, some of those cells absorbed cyanobacteria that eventually became chloroplasts, organelles that produce energy from sunlight. Approximately 100 million years ago, a lineage of amoeba in the genus Paulinella independently engulfed a cyanobacterium that evolved to be functionally synonymous with traditional chloroplasts, called chromatophores.

Some 100 million years ago, UCYN-A, a nitrogen-fixing bacterium, became an endosymbiont of the marine alga Braarudosphaera bigelowii, eventually evolving into a nitroplast, which fixes nitrogen. Similarly, diatoms in the family Rhopalodiaceae have cyanobacterial endosymbionts, called spheroid bodies or diazoplasts, which have been proposed to be in the early stages of organelle evolution.

Symbionts are either obligate (require their host to survive) or facultative (can survive independently). The most common examples of obligate endosymbiosis are mitochondria and chloroplasts; however, they do not reproduce via mitosis in tandem with their host cells. Instead, they replicate via binary fission, a replication process uncoupled from the host cells in which they reside. Some human parasites, e.g. Wuchereria bancrofti and Mansonella perstans, thrive in their intermediate insect hosts because of an obligate endosymbiosis with Wolbachia spp. They can both be eliminated by treatments that target their bacterial host.

== Etymology ==
Endosymbiosis comes from the Greek: ἔνδον endon "within", σύν syn "together" and βίωσις biosis "living".

== Symbiogenesis ==
An overview of the endosymbiosis theory of eukaryote origin (symbiogenesis).

Symbiogenesis theory holds that eukaryotes evolved via absorbing prokaryotes. Typically, one organism envelopes a bacterium and the two evolve a mutualistic relationship. The absorbed bacterium (the endosymbiont) eventually lives exclusively within the host cells. This fits the concept of observed organelle development.

Typically the endosymbiont's genome shrinks, discarding genes whose roles are displaced by the host. For example, the Hodgkinia genome of Magicicada cicadas is much different from that of the prior freestanding bacteria. The cicada life cycle involves years of stasis underground. The symbiont produces many generations during this phase, experiencing little selection pressure, allowing their genomes to diversify. Selection is episodic (when the cicadas reproduce). The original Hodgkinia genome split into three much simpler endosymbionts, each encoding only a few genes—an instance of punctuated equilibrium producing distinct lineages. The host requires all three symbionts.

== Transmission ==
Symbiont transmission is the process where the host acquires its symbiont. Since symbionts are not produced by host cells, they must find their own way to reproduce and populate daughter cells as host cells divide. Horizontal, vertical, and mixed-mode (hybrid of horizontal and vertical) transmission are the three paths for symbiont transfer.

=== Horizontal ===
Horizontal symbiont transfer (horizontal transmission) is a process where a host acquires a facultative symbiont from the environment or another host. The Rhizobia-Legume symbiosis (bacteria-plant endosymbiosis) is a prime example of this modality. The Rhizobia-legume symbiotic relationship is important for processes such as the formation of root nodules. It starts with flavonoids released by the legume host, which causes the rhizobia species (endosymbiont) to activate its Nod genes. These Nod genes generate lipooligosaccharide signals that the legume detects, leading to root nodule formation. This process bleeds into other processes such as nitrogen fixation in plants. The evolutionary advantage of such an interaction allows genetic exchange between both organisms involved to increase the propensity for novel functions as seen in the plant-bacterium interaction (holobiont formation).

=== Vertical ===
Vertical transmission takes place when the symbiont moves directly from parent to offspring. In horizontal transmission each generation acquires symbionts from the environment. An example is nitrogen-fixing bacteria in certain plant roots, such as pea aphid symbionts. A third type is mixed-mode transmission, where symbionts move horizontally for some generations, after which they are acquired vertically.

Wigglesworthia, a tsetse fly symbiont, is vertically transmitted (via mother's milk). In vertical transmission, the symbionts do not need to survive independently, often leading them to have a reduced genome. For instance, pea aphid symbionts have lost genes for essential molecules and rely on the host to supply them. In return, the symbionts synthesize essential amino acids for the aphid host. When a symbiont reaches this stage, it begins to resemble a cellular organelle, similar to mitochondria or chloroplasts. Such dependent hosts and symbionts form a holobiont. In the event of a bottleneck, a decrease in symbiont diversity could compromise host-symbiont interactions, as deleterious mutations accumulate.

== Hosts ==
=== Invertebrates ===
The best-studied examples of endosymbiosis are in invertebrates. These symbioses affect organisms with global impact, including Symbiodinium (corals), or Wolbachia (insects). Many insect agricultural pests and human disease vectors have intimate relationships with primary endosymbionts.

==== Insects ====
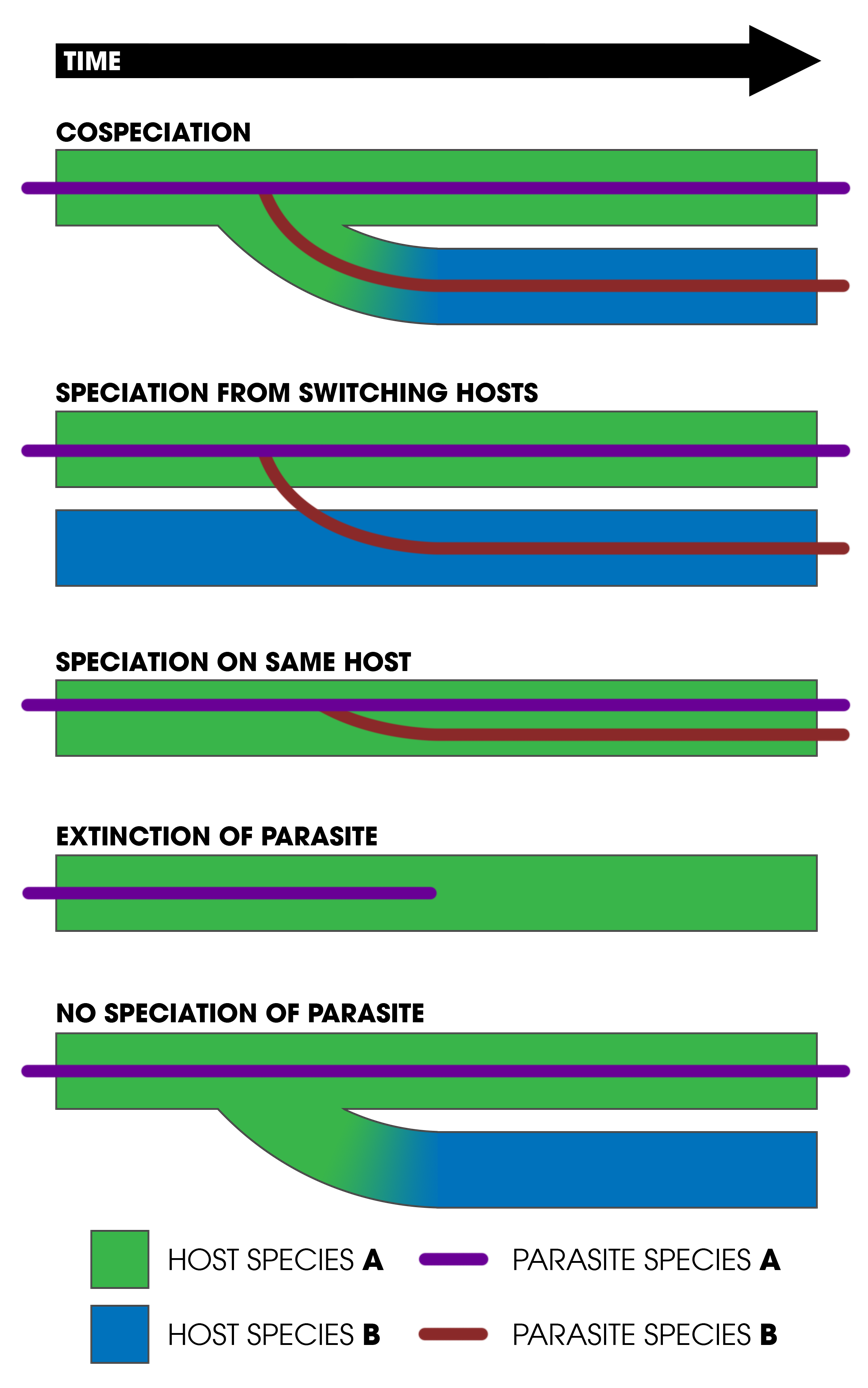
Diagram of cospeciation, where parasites or endosymbionts speciate or branch alongside their hosts. This process is more common in hosts with primary endosymbionts.

Scientists classify insect endosymbionts as Primary or Secondary. Primary endosymbionts (P-endosymbionts) have been associated with their insect hosts for millions of years (from ten to several hundred million years). They form obligate associations and display cospeciation with their insect hosts. Secondary endosymbionts more recently associated with their hosts, may be horizontally transferred, live in the hemolymph of the insects (not specialized bacteriocytes, see below), and are not obligate.

===== Primary =====
Among primary endosymbionts of insects, the best-studied are the pea aphid (Acyrthosiphon pisum) and its endosymbiont Buchnera sp. APS, the tsetse fly Glossina morsitans morsitans and its endosymbiont Wigglesworthia glossinidia brevipalpis and the endosymbiotic protists in lower termites. As with endosymbiosis in other insects, the symbiosis is obligate. Nutritionally enhanced diets allow symbiont-free specimens to survive, but they are unhealthy, and at best survive only a few generations.

In some insect groups, these endosymbionts live in specialized insect cells called bacteriocytes (also called mycetocytes), and are maternally transmitted, i.e. the mother transmits her endosymbionts to her offspring. In some cases, the bacteria are transmitted in the egg, as in Buchnera; in others like Wigglesworthia, they are transmitted via milk to the embryo. In termites, the endosymbionts reside within the hindguts and are transmitted through trophallaxis among colony members.

Primary endosymbionts are thought to help the host either by providing essential nutrients or by metabolizing insect waste products into safer forms. For example, the putative primary role of Buchnera is to synthesize essential amino acids that the aphid cannot acquire from its diet of plant sap. The primary role of Wigglesworthia is to synthesize vitamins that the tsetse fly does not get from the blood that it eats. In lower termites, the endosymbiotic protists play a major role in the digestion of lignocellulosic materials that constitute a bulk of the termites' diet.

Bacteria benefit from the reduced exposure to predators and competition from other bacterial species, the ample supply of nutrients and relative environmental stability inside the host.

Primary endosymbionts of insects have among the smallest of known bacterial genomes and have lost many genes commonly found in closely related bacteria. One theory claimed that some of these genes are not needed in the environment of the host insect cell. A complementary theory suggests that the relatively small numbers of bacteria inside each insect decrease the efficiency of natural selection in 'purging' deleterious mutations and small mutations from the population, resulting in a loss of genes over many millions of years. Research in which a parallel phylogeny of bacteria and insects was inferred supports the assumption that primary endosymbionts are transferred only vertically.

Attacking obligate bacterial endosymbionts may present a way to control their hosts, many of which are pests or human disease carriers. For example, aphids are crop pests and the tsetse fly carries the organism Trypanosoma brucei that causes African sleeping sickness. Studying insect endosymbionts can aid understanding the origins of symbioses in general, as a proxy for understanding endosymbiosis in other species.

The best-studied ant endosymbionts are Blochmannia bacteria, which are the primary endosymbiont of Camponotus ants. In 2018 a new ant-associated symbiont, Candidatus Westeberhardia cardiocondylae, was discovered in Cardiocondyla. It is reported to be a primary symbiont.

===== Secondary =====
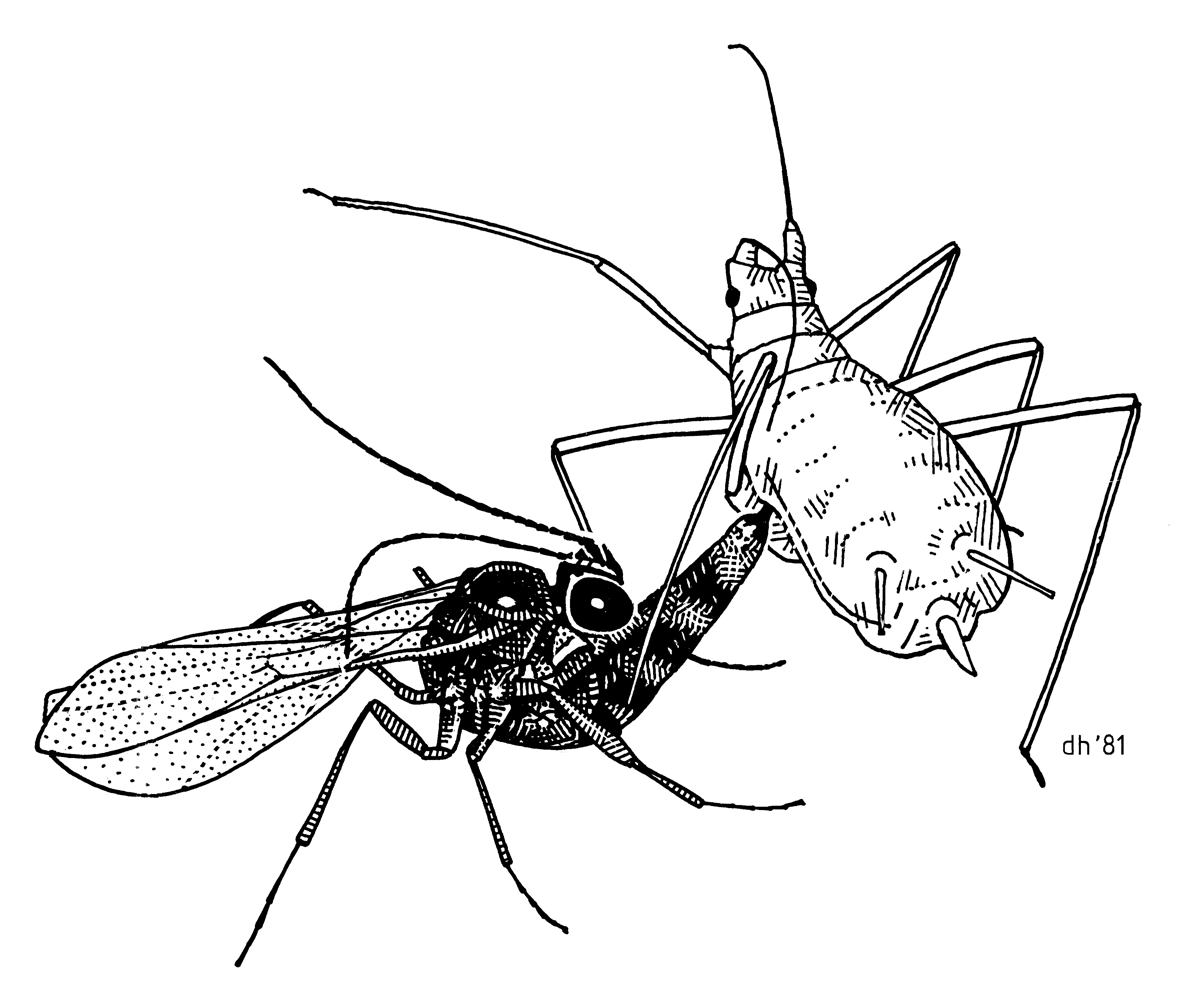
Pea aphids are commonly infested by parasitic wasps. Their secondary endosymbionts attack the infesting parasitoid wasp larvae promoting the survival of both the aphid host and its endosymbionts.

The pea aphid (Acyrthosiphon pisum) contains at least three secondary endosymbionts, Hamiltonella defensa, Regiella insecticola, and Serratia symbiotica. Hamiltonella defensa defends its aphid host from parasitoid wasps. This symbiosis replaces lost elements of the insect's immune response.

One of the best-understood defensive symbionts is the spiral bacteria Spiroplasma poulsonii. Spiroplasma sp. can be reproductive manipulators, but also defensive symbionts of Drosophila flies. In Drosophila neotestacea, S. poulsonii has spread across North America owing to its ability to defend its fly host against nematode parasites. This defence is mediated by toxins called "ribosome-inactivating proteins" that attack the molecular machinery of invading parasites. These toxins represent one of the first understood examples of a defensive symbiosis with a mechanistic understanding for defensive symbiosis between an insect endosymbiont and its host.

Sodalis glossinidius is a secondary endosymbiont of tsetse flies that lives inter- and intracellularly in various host tissues, including the midgut and hemolymph. Phylogenetic studies do not report a correlation between evolution of Sodalis and tsetse. Unlike Wigglesworthia, Sodalis has been cultured in vitro.

Cardinium is another clade of vertically transmitted bacterial endosymbionts that occurs in a range of arthropod hosts and often manipulates host reproductive biology to favor females that transmit the endosymbiont.

==== Marine ====
Extracellular endosymbionts are represented in all four extant classes of Echinodermata (Crinoidea, Ophiuroidea, Echinoidea, and Holothuroidea). Little is known of the nature of the association (mode of infection, transmission, metabolic requirements, etc.) but phylogenetic analysis indicates that these symbionts belong to the class Alphaproteobacteria, relating them to Rhizobium and Thiobacillus. Other studies indicate that these subcuticular bacteria may be both abundant within their hosts and widely distributed among the Echinoderms.

Some marine oligochaeta (e.g., Olavius algarvensis and Inanidrillus spp.) have obligate extracellular endosymbionts that fill the entire body of their host. These marine worms are nutritionally dependent on their symbiotic chemoautotrophic bacteria lacking any digestive or excretory system (no gut, mouth, or nephridia).

The sea slug Elysia chlorotica's endosymbiont is the algae Vaucheria litorea. The jellyfish Mastigias have a similar relationship with an algae. Elysia chlorotica forms this relationship intracellularly with the algae's chloroplasts. These chloroplasts retain their photosynthetic capabilities and structures for several months after entering the slug's cells.

Trichoplax have two bacterial endosymbionts. Ruthmannia lives inside the animal's digestive cells. Grellia lives permanently inside the endoplasmic reticulum (ER), the first known symbiont to do so.

Paracatenula is a flatworm which have lived in symbiosis with an endosymbiotic bacteria for 500 million years. The bacteria produce numerous small, droplet-like vesicles that provide the host with needed nutrients.

===== Dinoflagellates =====
Dinoflagellate endosymbionts of the genus Symbiodinium, commonly known as zooxanthellae, are found in corals, mollusks (esp. giant clams, the Tridacna), sponges, and the unicellular foraminifera. These endosymbionts capture sunlight and provide their hosts with energy via carbonate deposition.

Previously thought to be a single species, molecular phylogenetic evidence reported diversity in Symbiodinium. In some cases, the host requires a specific Symbiodinium clade. More often, however, the distribution is ecological, with symbionts switching among hosts with ease. When reefs become environmentally stressed, this distribution is related to the observed pattern of coral bleaching and recovery. Thus, the distribution of Symbiodinium on coral reefs and its role in coral bleaching is an important in coral reef ecology.

==== Phytoplankton ====
In marine environments, endosymbiont relationships are especially prevalent in oligotrophic or nutrient-poor regions of the ocean like that of the North Atlantic. In such waters, cell growth of larger phytoplankton such as diatoms is limited by (insufficient) nitrate concentrations. Endosymbiotic bacteria fix nitrogen for their hosts and in turn receive organic carbon from photosynthesis. These symbioses play an important role in global carbon cycling.

One known symbiosis between the diatom Hemialus spp. and the cyanobacterium Richelia intracellularis has been reported in North Atlantic, Mediterranean, and Pacific waters. Richelia is found within the diatom frustule of Hemiaulus spp., and has a reduced genome. A 2011 study measured nitrogen fixation by the cyanobacterial host Richelia intracellularis well above intracellular requirements, and found the cyanobacterium was likely fixing nitrogen for its host. Additionally, both host and symbiont cell growth were much greater than free-living Richelia intracellularis or symbiont-free Hemiaulus spp. The Hemaiulus-Richelia symbiosis is not obligatory, especially in nitrogen-replete areas.

Richelia intracellularis is also found in Rhizosolenia spp., a diatom found in oligotrophic oceans. Compared to the Hemaiulus host, the endosymbiosis with Rhizosolenia is much more consistent, and Richelia intracellularis is generally found in Rhizosolenia. There are some asymbiotic (occurs without an endosymbiont) Rhizosolenia, however there appears to be mechanisms limiting growth of these organisms in low nutrient conditions. Cell division for both the diatom host and cyanobacterial symbiont can be uncoupled and mechanisms for passing bacterial symbionts to daughter cells during cell division are still relatively unknown.

Other endosymbiosis with nitrogen fixers in open oceans include Calothrix in Chaetoceros spp. and UNCY-A in prymnesiophyte microalga. The Chaetoceros-Calothrix endosymbiosis is hypothesized to be more recent, as the Calothrix genome is generally intact. While other species like that of the UNCY-A symbiont and Richelia have reduced genomes. This reduction in genome size occurs within nitrogen metabolism pathways indicating endosymbiont species are generating nitrogen for their hosts and losing the ability to use this nitrogen independently. This endosymbiont reduction in genome size, might be a step that occurred in the evolution of organelles (above).

=== Protists ===
Mixotricha paradoxa is a protozoan that lacks mitochondria. However, spherical bacteria live inside the cell and serve the function of the mitochondria. Mixotricha has three other species of symbionts that live on the surface of the cell.

Paramecium bursaria, a species of ciliate, has a mutualistic symbiotic relationship with green alga called Zoochlorella. The algae live in its cytoplasm.

Platyophrya chlorelligera is a freshwater ciliate that harbors Chlorella that perform photosynthesis.

Strombidium purpureum is a marine ciliate that uses endosymbiotic, purple, non-sulphur bacteria for anoxygenic photosynthesis.

Paulinella chromatophora is a freshwater amoeboid that has a cyanobacterium endosymbiont.

Many foraminifera are hosts to several types of algae, such as red algae, diatoms, dinoflagellates and chlorophyta. These endosymbionts can be transmitted vertically to the next generation via asexual reproduction of the host, but because the endosymbionts are larger than the foraminiferal gametes, they need to acquire algae horizontally following sexual reproduction.

Several species of radiolaria have photosynthetic symbionts. In some species the host digests algae to keep the population at a constant level.

Hatena arenicola is a flagellate protist with a complicated feeding apparatus that feeds on other microbes. When it engulfs a green Nephroselmis alga, the feeding apparatus disappears and it becomes photosynthetic. During mitosis the algae is transferred to only one of the daughter cells, while the other cell restarts the cycle.

In 1966, biologist Kwang W. Jeon found that a lab strain of Amoeba proteus had been infected by bacteria that lived inside the cytoplasmic vacuoles. This infection killed almost all of the infected protists. After the equivalent of 40 host generations, the two organisms become mutually interdependent. A genetic exchange between the prokaryotes and protists occurred.

=== Vertebrates ===
The spotted salamander (Ambystoma maculatum) lives in a relationship with the algae Oophila amblystomatis, which grows in its egg cases.

=== Plants ===
All vascular plants harbor endosymbionts or endophytes in this context. They include bacteria, fungi, viruses, protozoa and even microalgae. Endophytes aid in processes such as growth and development, nutrient uptake, and defense against biotic and abiotic stresses like drought, salinity, heat, and herbivores.

Plant symbionts can be categorized into epiphytic, endophytic, and mycorrhizal. These relations can also be categorized as beneficial, mutualistic, neutral, and pathogenic. Microorganisms living as endosymbionts in plants can enhance their host's primary productivity either by producing or capturing important resources. These endosymbionts can also enhance plant productivity by producing toxic metabolites that aid plant defenses against herbivores.

Plants are dependent on plastid or chloroplast organelles. The chloroplast is derived from a cyanobacterial primary endosymbiosis that began over one billion years ago. An oxygenic, photosynthetic free-living cyanobacterium was engulfed and kept by a heterotrophic protist and eventually evolved into the present intracellular organelle.

Mycorrhizal endosymbionts appear only in fungi.

Typically, plant endosymbiosis studies focus on a single category or species to better understand their individual biological processes and functions.

==== Fungal endophytes ====
Fungal endophytes can be found in all plant tissues. Fungi living below the ground amidst plant roots are known as mycorrhiza, but are further categorized based on their location inside the root, with prefixes such as ecto, endo, arbuscular, ericoid, etc. Fungal endosymbionts that live in the roots and extend their extraradical hyphae into the outer rhizosphere are known as ectendosymbionts.

===== Arbuscular Mycorrhizal Fungi (AMF) =====
Arbuscular mycorrhizal fungi or AMF are the most diverse plant microbial endosymbionts. With exceptions such as the Ericaceae family, almost all vascular plants harbor AMF endosymbionts as endo and ecto as well. AMF plant endosymbionts systematically colonize plant roots and help the plant host acquire soil nutrients such as nitrogen. In return it absorbs plant organic carbon products. Plant root exudates contain diverse secondary metabolites, especially flavonoids and strigolactones that act as chemical signals and attracts the AMF. AMF Gigaspora margarita lives as a plant endosymbiont and also harbors further endosymbiont intracytoplasmic bacterium-like organisms. AMF generally promote plant health and growth and alleviate abiotic stresses such as salinity, drought, heat, poor nutrition, and metal toxicity. Individual AMF species have different effects in different hosts – introducing the AMF of one plant to another plant can reduce the latter's growth.

===== Endophytic fungi =====
Endophytic fungi in mutualistic relations directly benefit and benefit from their host plants. They also can help their hosts succeed in polluted environments such as those contaminated with toxic metals. Fungal endophytes are taxonomically diverse and are divided into categories based on mode of transmission, biodiversity, in planta colonization and host plant type. Clavicipitaceous fungi systematically colonize temperate season grasses. Non-clavicipitaceous fungi colonize higher plants and even roots and divide into subcategories. Aureobasidium and preussia species of endophytic fungi isolated from Boswellia sacra produce indole acetic acid hormone to promote plant health and development.

Aphids can be found in most plants. Carnivorous ladybirds are aphid predators and are used in pest control. Plant endophytic fungus Neotyphodium lolii produces alkaloid mycotoxins in response to aphid invasions. In response, ladybird predators exhibited reduced fertility and abnormal reproduction, suggesting that the mycotoxins are transmitted along the food chain and affect the predators.

==== Endophytic bacteria ====
Endophytic bacteria belong to a diverse group of plant endosymbionts characterized by systematic colonization of plant tissues. The most common genera include Pseudomonas, Bacillus, Acinetobacter, Actinobacteria, Sphingomonas. Some endophytic bacteria, such as Bacillus amyloliquefaciens, a seed-born endophytic bacteria, produce plant growth by producing gibberellins, which are potent plant growth hormones. Bacillus amyloliquefaciens promotes the taller height of transgenic dwarf rice plants. Some endophytic bacteria genera additionally belong to the Enterobacteriaceae family. Endophytic bacteria typically colonize the leaf tissues from plant roots, but can also enter the plant through the leaves through leaf stomata. Generally, the endophytic bacteria are isolated from the plant tissues by surface sterilization of the plant tissue in a sterile environment. Passenger endophytic bacteria eventually colonize inner tissue of plant by stochastic events while True endophytes possess adaptive traits because of which they live strictly in association with plants. The in vitro-cultivated endophytic bacteria association with plants is considered a more intimate relationship that helps plants acclimatize to conditions and promotes health and growth. Endophytic bacteria are considered to be plant's essential endosymbionts because virtually all plants harbor them, and these endosymbionts play essential roles in host survival. This endosymbiotic relation is important in terms of ecology, evolution and diversity. Endophytic bacteria such as Sphingomonas sp. and Serratia sp. that are isolated from arid land plants regulate endogenous hormone content and promote growth.

==== Archaea endosymbionts ====
Archaea are members of most microbiomes. While archaea are abundant in extreme environments, they are less abundant and diverse in association with eukaryotic hosts. Nevertheless, archaea are a substantial constituent of plant-associated ecosystems in the aboveground and belowground phytobiome, and play a role in host plant's health, growth and survival amid biotic and abiotic stresses. However, few studies have investigated the role of archaea in plant health and its symbiotic relationships. Most plant endosymbiosis studies focus on fungal or bacteria using metagenomic approaches.

The characterization of archaea includes crop plants such as rice and maize, but also aquatic plants. The abundance of archaea varies by tissue type; for example archaea are more abundant in the rhizosphere than the phyllosphere and endosphere. This archaeal abundance is associated with plant species type, environment and the plant's developmental stage. In a study on plant genotype-specific archaeal and bacterial endophytes, 35% of archaeal sequences were detected in overall sequences (achieved using amplicon sequencing and verified by real time-PCR). The archaeal sequences belong to the phyla Thaumarchaeota, Crenarchaeota, and Euryarchaeota.

=== Bacteria ===
Some Betaproteobacteria have Gammaproteobacteria endosymbionts.

=== Fungi ===
Fungi host endohyphal bacteria; the effects of the bacteria are not well studied. Many such fungi in turn live within plants. These fungi are otherwise known as fungal endophytes. It is hypothesized that the fungi offers a safe haven for the bacteria, and the diverse bacteria that they attract create a micro-ecosystem.

These interactions may impact the way that fungi interact with the environment by modulating their phenotypes. The bacteria do this by altering the fungi's gene expression. For example, Luteibacter sp. has been shown to naturally infect the ascomycetous endophyte Pestalotiopsis sp. isolated from Platycladus orientalis. The Luteibacter sp. influences the auxin and enzyme production within its host, which, in turn, may influence the effect the fungus has on its plant host. Another interesting example of a bacterium living in symbiosis with a fungus is the fungus Mortierella. This soil-dwelling fungus lives in close association with a toxin-producing bacteria, Mycoavidus, which helps the fungus defend against nematodes.

In 2024, researchers injected individual cells of the bacterium Mycetohabitans rhizoxinica into cells of the fungus Rhizopus microsporus and were able to propagate the pair of cells for ten rounds using fluorescence-activated cell sorting to select fungal cells containing the bacterium. They found that the fungus's DNA changed during the rounds of propagation. This was claimed to be the first time that endosymbiosis was artificially induced in a laboratory.

== Virus endosymbionts ==
The Human Genome Project found several thousand endogenous retroviruses, endogenous viral elements in the genome that closely resemble and can be derived from retroviruses, organized into 24 families.

== See also ==
- Anagenesis – Gradual evolutionary change in a species without splitting
- Cyanobiont – Symbiotic bacterium
- Ectosymbiosis – Symbiosis in which the symbiont lives on the body surface of the host
- Endophyte – Endosymbiotic bacterium or fungus
- Epibiont – Organism that lives on surface of another living organism
- Fungal-bacterial endosymbiosis
- List of symbiotic organisms – Ecological interaction between taxa
- List of symbiotic relationships – Ecological interaction between taxa
- Multigenomic organism – Ecological interaction between taxa
- Nitroplast – Nitrogen-fixing organelle
- Protocell – Lipid globule proposed as a precursor of living cells
