= Aphanothecaceae =

Scientific classification
- Domain: Bacteria
- Kingdom: Bacillati
- Phylum: Cyanobacteriota
- Class: Cyanophyceae
- Order: Chroococcales
- Family: Aphanothecaceae; Komárek et al. 2014

Genera
- Aphanothece Nägeli 1849; Atelocyanobacterium Thompson et al. 2012; Crocosphaera Zehr et al. 2001; Cyanoaggregatum Werner et al. 2008; Cyanogastrum Schiller 1956; Dzensia Voronichin 1929; Euhalothece Garcia-Pichel 2000 provis.; Gloeothece Nägeli 1849; Halothece Margheri et al. 2008; Hormothece Jao 1944; Myxobactron Schmidle 1904; Rippkaea Mareš et al. 2015 provis.; Rubidibacter Choi et al. 2008

Family of bacteria

The Aphanothecaceae is a family of cyanobacteria.

== Phylogeny ==
See Microcystaceae#GTDB (partial) for overview.

=== Crocosphaera ===
Phylogeny expanded here because Crocosphaera currently redirects to this page.

Phylogenomic tree per GTDB Release 10-RS226.

- Crocosphaera 100
  - 92
    - 25
      - 52
        - 100
          - 95
            - 85
              - C. chwakensis
              - C. sp002172675
            - C. sp003013815
          - C. subtropica
        - 100
          - C. sp030065205
          - C. sp030066295
      - 28
        - 100
          - 100
            - C. watsonii
            - C. sp030064895
          - C. sp038442745
        - C. sp030065735
    - C. sp030064955
  - C. sp030064935
- Atelocyanobacterium
  - A. thalassa
  - A. thalassa_A
