= Diazotroph =

Bacteria and archaea producing ammonia

Diazotrophs are organisms capable of nitrogen fixation, i.e. converting the relatively inert diatomic nitrogen (N_{2}) in Earth's atmosphere into bioavailable compound forms such as ammonia. Diazotrophs are typically microorganisms such as bacteria and archaea, with examples being rhizobia and Frankia and Azospirillum. All diazotrophs contain iron-molybdenum or iron-vanadium nitrogenase systems, and two of the most studied systems are those of Klebsiella pneumoniae and Azotobacter vinelandii due to their genetic tractability and their fast growth.

== Etymology ==
The word diazotroph is derived from the words diazo ("di" = two + "azo" = nitrogen) meaning "dinitrogen (N_{2})" and troph meaning "pertaining to food or nourishment", in summary dinitrogen utilizing. The word azote means nitrogen in French and was named by French chemist and biologist Antoine Lavoisier, who saw it as the part of air which cannot sustain life.

== Types ==
Diazotrophs are scattered across Bacteria taxonomic groups (as well as a couple of Archaea). Even within a species that can fix nitrogen there may be strains that do not. Nitrogen fixation is an energetically costly process and is thus reduced when other sources of nitrogen are available, and, for many species, when oxygen is at high partial pressure. Bacteria have different ways of dealing with the debilitating effects of oxygen on nitrogenases. Symbiotic diazotrophs have traditionally been considered to be more relevant to global nitrogen cycles, as the plant hosts may produce a favorable environment for diazotrophy, but free-living diazotrophs are also significant nitrogen fixers.

=== Symbiotic diazotrophs ===
- Rhizobia—these are the species that associate with legumes, plants of the family Fabaceae. Oxygen is bound to leghemoglobin in the root nodules that house the bacterial symbionts, and supplied at a rate that will not harm the nitrogenase.
- Frankias—'actinorhizal' nitrogen fixers. The bacteria also infect the roots, leading to the formation of nodules. Actinorhizal nodules consist of several lobes, each lobe has a similar structure as a lateral root. Frankia is able to colonize in the cortical tissue of nodules, where it fixes nitrogen. Actinorhizal plants and Frankias also produce haemoglobins. Their role is less well established than for rhizobia. Although at first, it appeared that they inhabit sets of unrelated plants (alders, Australian pines, California lilac, bog myrtle, bitterbrush, Dryas), revisions to the phylogeny of angiosperms show a close relatedness of these species and the legumes. These footnotes suggest the ontogeny of these replicates rather than the phylogeny. In other words, an ancient gene (from before the angiosperms and gymnosperms diverged) that is unused in most species was reawakened and reused in these species.
- Cyanobacteria—there are also symbiotic cyanobacteria. Some associate with fungi as lichens, with liverworts, with a fern, and with a cycad. These do not form nodules (indeed most of the plants do not have roots). Heterocysts exclude the oxygen, as discussed above. The fern association is important agriculturally: the water fern Azolla harbouring Anabaena is an important green manure for rice culture.
- Association with animals—although diazotrophs have been found in many animal guts, there is usually sufficient ammonia present to suppress nitrogen fixation. Termites on a low nitrogen diet allow for some fixation, but the contribution to the termite's nitrogen supply is negligible. Shipworms may be the only species that derive significant benefit from their gut symbionts.

=== Free-living diazotrophs ===
- Anaerobes—these are obligate anaerobes that cannot tolerate oxygen even if they are not fixing nitrogen. They live in habitats low in oxygen, such as soils and decaying vegetable matter. Clostridium is an example. Sulphate-reducing bacteria are important in ocean sediments (e.g. Desulfovibrio), and some Archean methanogens, like Methanococcus, fix nitrogen in muds, animal intestines and anoxic soils.
- Facultative anaerobes—these species can grow either with or without oxygen, but they only fix nitrogen anaerobically. Often, they respire oxygen as rapidly as it is supplied, keeping the amount of free oxygen low. Examples include Klebsiella pneumoniae, Paenibacillus polymyxa, Bacillus macerans, and Escherichia intermedia.
- Aerobes—these species require oxygen to grow, yet their nitrogenase is still debilitated if exposed to oxygen. Azotobacter vinelandii is the most studied of these organisms. It uses very high respiration rates, and protective compounds, to prevent oxygen damage. Many other species also reduce the oxygen levels in this way, but with lower respiration rates and lower oxygen tolerance.
- Oxygenic photosynthetic bacteria (cyanobacteria) generate oxygen as a by-product of photosynthesis, yet some are able to fix nitrogen as well. These are colonial bacteria that have specialized cells (heterocysts) that lack the oxygen generating steps of photosynthesis. Examples are Anabaena cylindrica and Nostoc commune. Other cyanobacteria lack heterocysts and can fix nitrogen only in low light and oxygen levels (e.g. Plectonema). Some cyanobacteria, including the highly abundant marine taxa Prochlorococcus and Synechococcus do not fix nitrogen, whilst other marine cyanobacteria, such as Trichodesmium and Cyanothece, are major contributors to oceanic nitrogen fixation.
- Anoxygenic photosynthetic bacteria do not generate oxygen during photosynthesis, having only a single photosystem which cannot split water. Nitrogenase is expressed under nitrogen limitation. Normally, the expression is regulated via negative feedback from the produced ammonium ion but in the absence of N_{2}, the product is not formed, and the by-product H_{2} continues unabated [Biohydrogen]. Example species: Rhodobacter sphaeroides, Rhodopseudomonas palustris, Rhodobacter capsulatus.

== Cultivation ==
Under the laboratory conditions, extra nitrogen sources are not needed to grow free-living diazotrophs. Carbon sources (such as sucrose or glucose) and a small amount of inorganic salt are added to the medium. Free-living diazotrophs can directly use atmospheric nitrogen (N_{2}). However, while cultivating several symbiotic diazotrophs, such as rhizobia, it is necessary to add nitrogen because rhizobia and other symbiotic nitrogen-fixing bacteria can not use molecular nitrogen (N_{2}) in free-living form and only fix nitrogen during symbiosis with a host plant.

== Application ==
=== Biofertilizer ===
Diazotroph fertilizer is a kind of biofertilizer that can use nitrogen-fixing microorganisms to convert molecular nitrogen (N_{2}) into ammonia (which is the formation of nitrogen available for the crops to use). These nitrogen nutrients then can be used in the process of protein synthesis for the plants. This whole process of nitrogen fixation by diazotroph is called biological nitrogen fixation. This biochemical reaction can be carried out under normal temperature and pressure conditions, so it does not require extreme conditions and specific catalysts in fertilizer production. Therefore, producing available nitrogen in this way can be cheap, clean and efficient. Nitrogen-fixing bacteria fertilizer is an ideal and promising biofertilizer.

Symbiosis between the roots of leguminous crops and rhizobia (a kind of diazotroph) has led agricultural societies to use legumes as a means of increasing soil fertility since ancient times. These rhizobia can be considered a natural biofertilizer which provides available nitrogen in the soil. By growing leguminous crops in association with non-leguminous crops, farmers could make use of the nitrogen-fixing properties of the rhizobia to increase soil fertility and crop yields.

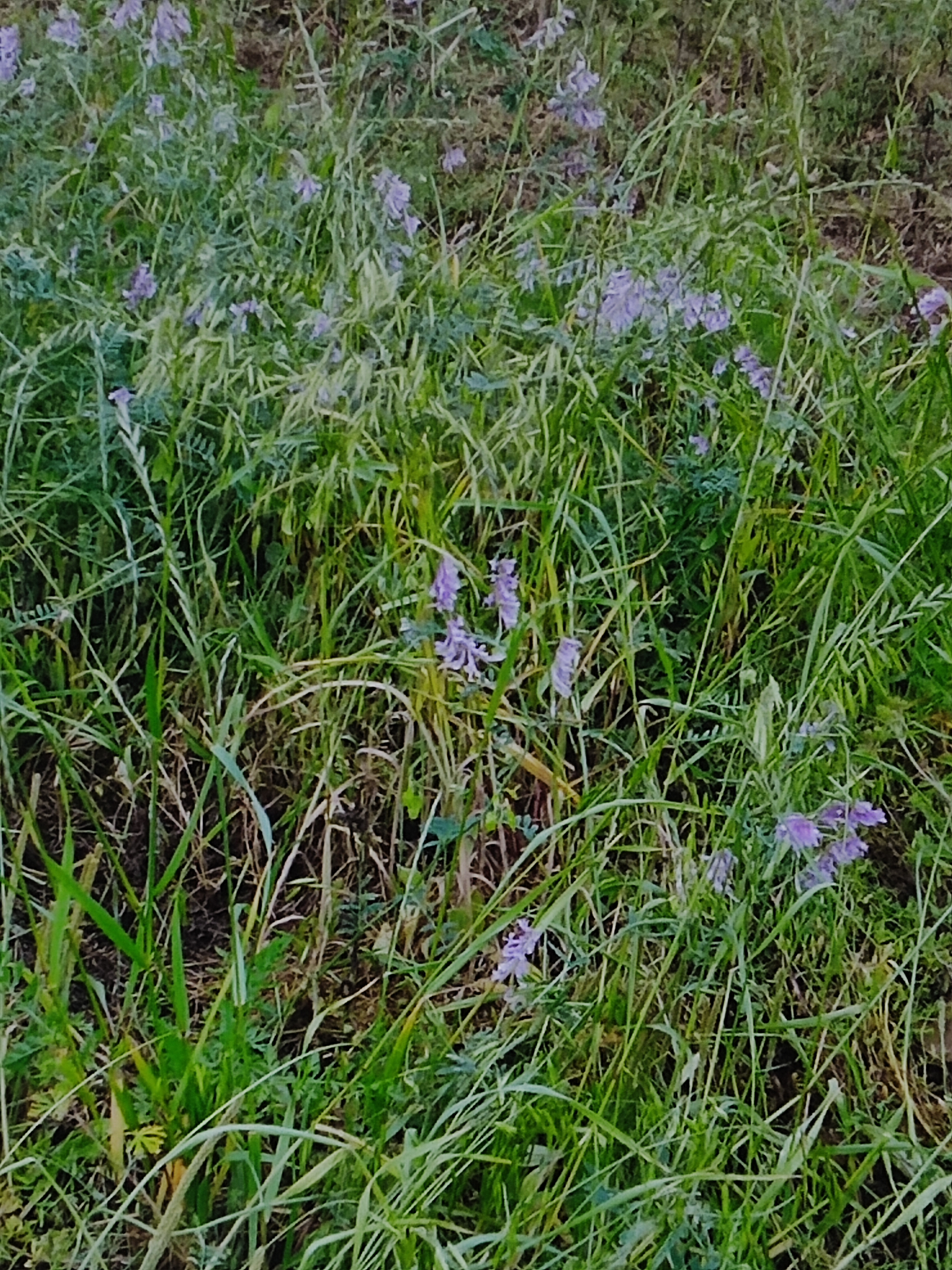
Leguminous plants used to fertilize an abandoned land

Diazotroph biofertilizers used today include Rhizobium, Azotobacter, Azospirilium and Blue green algae (a genus of cyanobacteria). These fertilizer are widely used and commenced into industrial production. So far in the market, nitrogen fixation biofertilizer can be divided into liquid fertilizer and solid fertilizer. Most of the fertilizers are fermented in the way of liquid fermentation. After fermentation, the liquid bacteria can be packaged, which is the liquid fertilizer, and the fermented liquid can also be adsorbed with sterilized peat and other carrier adsorbents to form a solid microbial fertilizer. These nitrogen-fixation fertilizer has a certain effect on increasing the production of cotton, rice, wheat, peanuts, rape, corn, sorghum, potatoes, tobacco, sugarcane and various vegetables.

== Importance ==
In organisms the symbiotic associations greatly exceed the free-living species, with the exception of cyanobacteria.

Biologically available nitrogen such as ammonia is the primary limiting factor for life on earth. Diazotroph plays an important roles in nitrogen cycle of the earth. In the terrestrial ecosystem, the diazotroph fix the (N_{2}) from the atmosphere and provide the available nitrogen for the primary producer. Then the nitrogen is transferred to higher trophical levels and human beings. The formation and storage of nitrogen will all influenced by the transformation process. Also the available nitrogen fixed by the diazotroph is environmentally sustainable, which can reduce the use of fertilizer, which can be an important topic in agricultural research.

In marine ecosystem, prokaryotic phytoplankton (such as cyanobacteria) is the main nitrogen fixer, then the nitrogen consumed by higher trophical levels. The fixed N released from these organisms is a component of ecosystem N inputs. And also the fixed N is important for the coupled C cycle. A greater oceanic inventory of fixed N may increase the primary production and export of organic C to the deep ocean.
