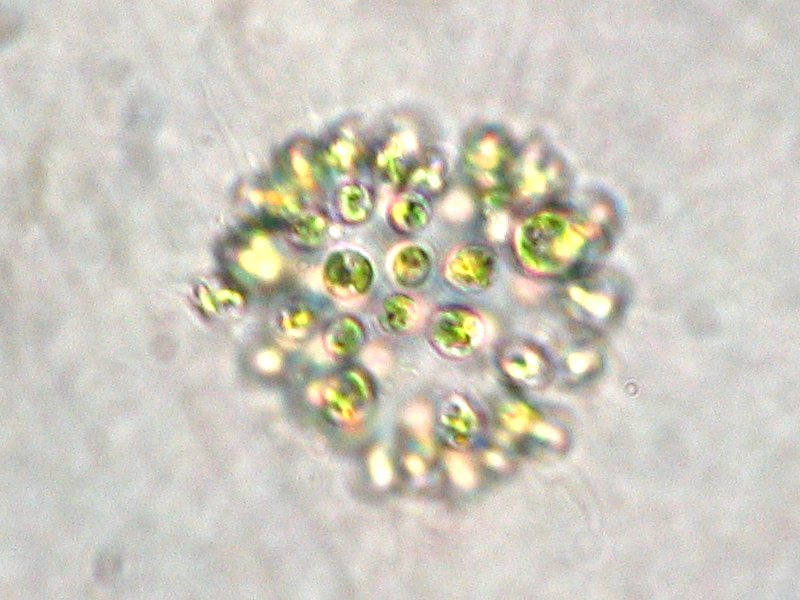
- Microcystis aeruginosa

Scientific classification
- Domain: Bacteria
- Kingdom: Bacillati
- Phylum: Cyanobacteriota
- Class: Cyanophyceae
- Order: Chroococcales
- Family: Microcystaceae; Elenkin

Genera
- See #Genera

= Microcystaceae =

Family of bacteria

Microcystaceae is family of cyanobacteria which contains the harmful algal bloom Microcystis aeruginosa.

== Characteristics ==
The family is characterized by single, floating cells or colonies which are embedded to a matrix. There is also a lack of differentiation between apical and basal structures.

== Genera ==
The following genera are accepted within Microcystaceae:

- Altericista Averina et al. 2021
- Anacystis Meneghini 1837
- Aphanocapsa Nägeli 1849
- Aphanothece Nägeli 1849
- Aplococcus Roze 1896
- Asterocapsa Chu 1952
- Bichatia Turpin 1828 nom.rej. without replacement
- Cagniardia Trevisan 1848
- Chalicogloea Roldán et al. 2013
- Coccopedia Troitzkaja 1922
- Coelomoron Buell 1938
- Coelosphaeriopsis Lemmermann 1899
- Coelosphaerium Nägeli 1849
- Crocosphaera Zehr et al. 2019
- Cyanoaggregatum Werner et al. 2008
- Cyanocatena Hindák 1975
- Cyanocomperia Hindák 2002
- Cyanodorina Chen et al. 2023
- Cyanogranis Hindák 1982
- Cyanonephron Hickel 1985
- Cyanostylon Geitler 1928
- Cyanotetras Hindák 1988
- Dzensia Woronichin 1929
- Eucapsis Clements and Shantz 1909
- Eucapsopsis de Oliveira et al. 2024
- Globuloella Korde 1958
- Gloeothece Nägeli 1849
- Gonidium Ehrenberg ex Meneghini 1840
- Hormothece Jao 1944
- Mantellum Dangeard 1941
- Merismoarcus Hindák 1988
- Merismopedia Meyen 1839
- Microcystis Kützing 1833
- "Microhaloa" Kützing 1843 nom.nud.
- Palaeomicrocystis Korde 1955
- Pannus Hickel 1991
- Pilgeria Schmidle 1901
- Planktocyanocapsa Hindák 2002
- Prochloron Lewin ex Hoffmann and Greuter 1993
- Pseudoholopedia (Ryppowa 1925) Elenkin 1938
- Pseudoncobyrsa Geitler 1925
- Radiocystis Skuja 1948
- Rhyniococcus Edwards and Lyon 1983
- Rippkaea Johansen and Mareš 2019
- Rubidibacter Choi et al. 2008
- Siphonosphaera Hindák 1988
- Snowella Elenkin 1938
- Sorospora Hassall 1845
- Spelaeotes corrig. Panou and Gkelis 2022
- Sphaerocavum Azevedo and Sant'Anna 2003
- Sphinctosiphon West 1907
- Synechocystis Sauvageau 1892
- Thaumaleocystis Trevisan 1848
- Uranovia Korde 1958
- Woronichinia Elenkin 1933
- Zehria Johansen and Mareš 2019

== Phylogeny ==
=== GTDB (partial) ===
Phylogeny per GTDB Release 10-RS226 (April 2025).

- - 28
    - 91
      - 86
        - 100
          - 99
            - 100
              - 80
                - 100
                  - 100
                    Crocosphaera
                  - 100
                    Atelocyanobacterium
                - JBCDDV01 sp039180145
              - UHCC-0190
            - Aphanothece_B sacrum
          - 100
            Rippkaea
        - JBGTNM01 sp041743025
      - JBGTGT01 sp041746575
    - 100
      Hydrococcus
  - 64
    - 100
      - 45
        - 100
          - 100
            - Microcystis
            - Pannus brasiliensis
          - Chroococcopsis gigantea
        - JBBAUO01 sp040398185
      - 100
        Chroococcus
    - 100
      Gloeothece
