= No-SCAR genome editing =

Genome manipulation method

No-SCAR genome editing is an editing method that is able to manipulate the Escherichia coli (E. coli) genome. The system relies on recombineering whereby DNA sequences are combined and manipulated through homologous recombination. No-SCAR is able to manipulate the E. coli genome without the use of the chromosomal markers detailed in previous recombineering methods. Instead, the λ-Red recombination system facilitates donor DNA integration while Cas9 cleaves double-stranded DNA to counter-select against wild-type cells. Although λ-Red and Cas9 genome editing are widely used technologies, the no-SCAR method is novel in combining the two functions; this technique is able to establish point mutations, gene deletions, and short sequence insertions in several genomic loci with increased efficiency and time sensitivity.

== Background and overview ==
=== λ-red recombineering system ===
The λ-red recombineering system was published in 1998 and allows for insertion, deletion, or mutations to E. coli genes. In this system, the red operon from bacteriophage λ is transfected into E. coli cells to facilitate incorporation of linear target DNA into the E. coli genome. The bacteriophage λ-red operon consists of the exo, bet, and gam genes which, together, are responsible for recombineering. Phage λ exonuclease (exo) degrades transfected linear target DNA from the 5' end. Beta binds to the resulting single stranded 3' end and incorporates it into the target DNA to form the recombinant DNA. Phage λ gamma is necessary to inhibit E. coli nuclease activity and protect the transformed linear DNA in vivo.

Following λ-red operon activity induction, a linear, double-stranded cassette encoding a selectable marker, such as antibiotic resistance, is transformed into the cells in place of the target gene and incorporated into the DNA behind a specific inducible promoter. This allows for growth selection of the recombinant cells with proper insertion location verified using polymerase chain reaction (PCR). Specific incorporation can be achieved by including flanking PCR primers around the inserted linear DNA that are complement to the targeted insertion site. After selection of the recombinants, a second transformation is needed to remove the selective marker. A plasmid expressing flippase (FLP) can be transformed into the recombined cells, which can specifically cleave FLP recognition target sites (FRTs) flanking the antibiotic resistance gene. While this successfully removes the selective marker from the genome, it leaves FRT scars in place of the target gene.

The λ-red system has also been optimized for scarless recombination; however, this is a two-step system consisting of selection and counterselection. In this case, a gene cassette with a dual selectable marker can be incorporated into the DNA at the specific location of mutagenesis. After selection of recombinants, a subsequent transformation to transfect linear DNA with the desired mutation is performed, which will then be homologously recombined into the cellular DNA in place of the marker. Therefore, counterselection against the cells containing the marker needs to be performed in order to identify the cells that have successfully incorporated the linear DNA into the target sequence. This can be verified using PCR screening. The method of recombination detailed above is advantageous as it provides an alternative to the low-efficiency, laborious, and multi-step recombination processes using endonucleases and ligases. Therefore, λ-red recombination is more specific in terms of possible genomic alterations that are not governed by locations of restriction enzyme recognition sites. However, it also has many limitations. Multiple rounds of transformations can increase the risk of error and increase recombination time. Therefore, efficiency can be low (0.1–10% for point mutations; 10^{−5}–10^{−6} for insertions, deletions, or replacements) and requires long growth into workable colonies between transformations and recombinant selections. All together, this contributes to a lengthy and inefficient mutagenesis procedure for even single mutations. This technique can also leave scars that can contribute to destabilization of the chromosome and impact the success of the manipulation.

=== CRISPR/Cas9 recombination ===
A more recent method for genome editing uses CRISPR (Clustered Regularly Interspaced Short Palindromic Repeats) sequences and the endonuclease Cas9 (CRISPR-associated protein 9). These components are an integral part of the immune response for some bacteria. and have been repurposed for genome engineering. In this system, sequences matching foreign bacteriophage or plasmid DNA are incorporated as "spacer" sequences into the bacterial genome located between repeating CRISPR loci. Cas endonucleases are able to initiate double strand breaks within these foreign DNAs that are complement to the transcribed CRISPR RNAs (crRNA, or "protospacers"), thus degrading them. A conserved protospacer-adjacent motif (PAM, sequence 5'-NGG-3') located immediately downstream of the protospacer in the cellular genome is necessary for Cas9 cleavage. Together, this system allows for adaptive immunity to the dynamic viral genetic material.

In 2013, methods for harnessing this system for use in editing mutations or insertions of specific E. coli sequences were published. This method includes constructing a plasmid consisting of the cas9 gene and CRISPR loci containing the matching target DNA, called single guide RNA (sgRNA). After expression is induced, Cas9 is able to identify the target DNA sequence of the cellular genome by finding the sgRNA complement and initiate strand breaks in the E. coli genome. This allows a transfected, linear DNA sequence to be incorporated into the genome, relying on the cellular machinery to use the linear DNA flanked by homologous regions specific to the cleaved location as a template to rebuild using homology directed repair.

This method is advantageous in that it allows multiple mutations to be introduced into the genome in one experiment. It also has vastly improved efficiency over previous technologies and allows for almost any kind of mutation with ease. These advantages make the CRISPR/Cas9 recombination technique the most promising for application in human health. However, major drawbacks exist, including, most prominently, off-target cleavage that can result in unintended genome disruptions.

=== Integrating λ-red and Cas9 recombination ===
Reisch and Prather pioneered a technique that combines both the λ-red and CRISPR/Cas9 recombination systems to form a novel methodology called no-SCAR (Scarless Cas9 Assisted Recombineering) for E. coli genome modifications. In this method, a plasmid containing the gene for Cas9 expression (cas9) is first transformed into E. coli cells. After selecting for the transformants using antibiotic resistance, another plasmid containing the targeted gene of interest in the form of sgRNA and the λ-red operon is transformed. After induced expression of the λ-red recombineering system, linear DNA to be incorporated into the E. coli genome is transformed into the cells. The expression of Cas9 and the sgRNA are then induced, which results in the Cas9 locating the E. coli target DNA based on the sgRNA complement. Cas9 is able to initiate a double strand break and the λ-red system is able to bring the linear DNA to E. coli genome for homologous recombination. The cells are then cured of the plasmid containing the specific sgRNA and then the next plasmid containing the specific sgRNA target sequence can be transformed and the process is repeated.

This system is able to modify numerous genome locations rapidly. In instances when a small number of mutations are introduced into the genome, the time efficiency of no-SCAR is comparable to other methods. However, with a large number of alterations, this technique is superior.

== Methodology ==
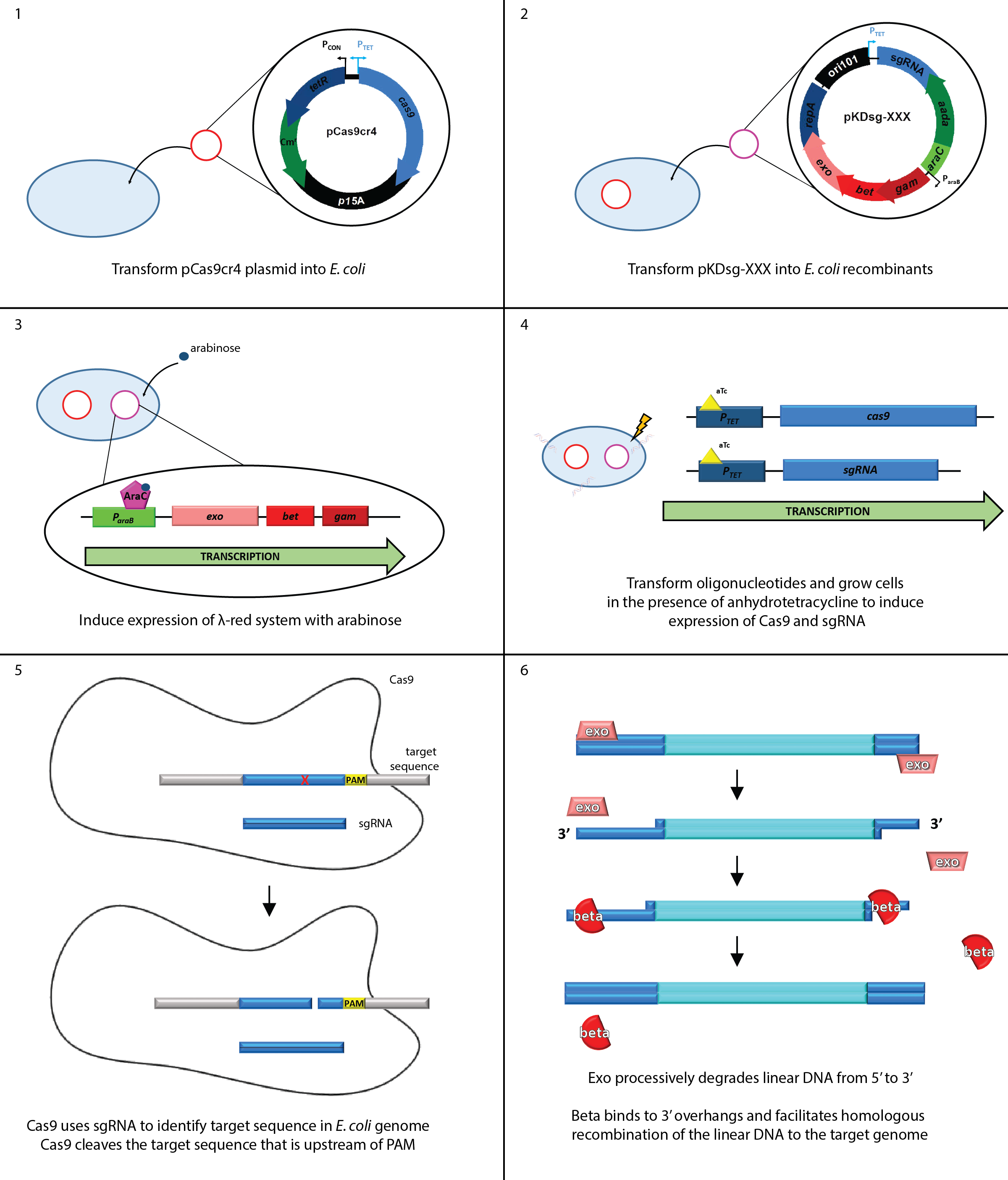
In no-SCAR genome editing, both the pCas9cr4 and pKDsg-XXX plasmids are sequentially transformed into E. coli cells. Upon induction of the λ-red recombination machinery, linear DNA to be inserted into the E. coli target sequence can be transformed into the cells through electroporation. Expression of Cas9 and sgRNA is induced, resulting in Cas9-mediated cleavage of the targeted E. coli genome and subsequent λ-red-mediated homologous recombination and annealing of the linear DNA to the target sequence.

=== Plasmids ===
SCAR-less editing uses plasmids for genome modification created using circular polymerase extension cloning. Briefly, in a one-step reaction, this process can assemble and clone multiple inserts into any vector and requires no restriction enzyme digestion, ligation, or homologous recombination. Therefore, this method contributes to the cost-effectiveness and throughput of the no-SCAR system.

The no-SCAR technique uses a two-plasmid system; this is because co-transformation of both cas9 containing plasmid and the sgRNA plasmid results in cell death. More specifically, the cell lethality is a consequence of Cas9 cleaving the E. coli DNA that matches the sgRNA. In order to circumvent this issue, multiple plasmids are used in order to maintain expressional control of both cas9 and sgRNA.

The P_{TET} promoter plays an integral role in the expression of both plasmids. It drives transcriptional expression of both the sgRNA of interest and cas9 in the host cell upon induction with anhydrotetracycline (aTc). In the absence of the inducer, the P_{TET} promoter is repressed by the constitutively expressed tetracycline repressor protein (TetR). Therefore, the presence of TetR in the host cell prior to the introduction of both sgRNA and cas9 is a measure to avoid cell lethality.

The first plasmid used in the pioneering work of Reisch and Prather is composed of: the cas9 gene under the control of the P_{TET} promoter; the tetR gene, which codes for tetracycline repressor protein, under control of a constitutive promoter; and the cm^{r} gene for chloramphenicol resistance. It was observed that leaky expression of Cas9 occurred even without induction of the P_{TET} promoter. Therefore, to avoid cell death, a transfer messenger RNA (ssrA) tag was included in the plasmid downstream of the cas9 gene. In the event of leaky Cas9 expression, the C-terminal ssrA tag would be recognized by ClpP protease and degrade Cas9 to allow for better expressional control of the protein. Together, these components make up the pCas9cr4 plasmid and allow targeting of the host cell chromosome.

The second plasmid used in the no-SCAR method consists of: the sgRNA of interest expressed under the control of the P_{TET} promoter; the three genes that make up the λ-red system (exo, bet, and gam) under the control of the P_{araB} promoter, which is induced by arabinose; and the gene conferring resistance to aminoglycosides, such as spectinomycin and streptomycin. These components make up the pKDsg-XXX plasmid to facilitate λ-red mediated alterations of the E. coli genome, where -XXX denotes the targeted sequence to modify.

In summary, theoretically, the plasmids for use in this method can be constructed to allow for absolute customization of the protocol. One stipulation is that each of the two constructed plasmids should have distinct selectable markers, such as genes conferring resistance to two different antibiotics, to allow for targeted selection and counterselection. Furthermore, the pCas9cr4 plasmid can be purchased from Addgene (ID 62655) for direct implementation into a no-SCAR recombination experiment, and the pKDsgRNA-p15 (ID 62656) and pKDsgRNA-ack (ID 62654) plasmids can also be purchased from Addgene.

=== Transformations ===
The next step in the no-SCAR protocol is to transform the pCas9cr4 and pKDsg-XXX plasmids and linear oligonucleotides into the E. coli cells themselves. In order to achieve this, the cells are made to be electrocompetent; one such method, as used by Reisch and Pather, is using a glycerol/mannitol density step gradient, which is fast and simple. This allows for transformation through electroporation and introduction of the plasmids and DNA into the cells.

In order to increase transformation efficiency, transformed cells are grown in super optimal broth to expedite the recovery process after transformation. In this method, two subsequent transformations must be performed in order to incorporate the pCas9cr4 and pKDsg-XXX plasmids necessary for recombination. This is because preliminary studies found that when both Cas9 and sgRNA were expressed at the same time without the linear DNA to be incorporated into the genome, cell death was induced due to the disruption of the crucial gene. Therefore, the expression of the recombination machinery and sgRNA were kept under strict control and transformed stepwise to reduce cell lethality.

To ensure the pCas9cr4 plasmid was first successfully admitted to the cells, the cells were grown on a plate containing chloramphenicol ; the pCas9cr4 plasmid contained the gene cm^{r}, conferring resistance to chloramphenicol, which ensured only the successful recombinants grew. Triplicate plates of 10μL of recovered cultures as well as dilutions of 10^{−1}, 10^{−2}, and 10^{−3} were then spotted and incubated overnight at 30 °C and CFU, or colony forming unit, assessments were then made to identify successful mutants using the miniaturized plating method described previously. Once the mutation of interest was screened using overnight growth on M9 minimal medium plates supplemented with glycerol, chloroacetate and SOC (super optimal broth with catabolite repression), colonies were patched onto selective plates using a toothpick and incubated at 30 °C for two nights. After sufficient colony growth, cells were transfected with the pKDsg-XXX plasmid containing the aada gene, and as a result were resistant to the aminoglycosides spectinomycin and streptomycin. To ensure that the pKDsg-XXX plasmid was successfully admitted to the cells, the cells were grown on a plate containing both chloramphenicol and spectinomycin to select for cells containing both the pCas9cr4 and pKDsg-XXX plasmids.

Following successful recombination of the linear DNA to the target genome, plasmid origins and markers can be re-used as a result of the plasmid curing method. The pKDsgRNA contains a temperature sensitive open reading frame which, when grown at 37 °C, denatures the plasmid. This allows for easy plasmid curing that does not include any additional reagents. This is useful because upon curing of the pKDsg-XXX plasmid, another pKDsg-XXX plasmid with a different sgRNA can subsequently be transfected into the E. coli cells to introduce further mutations to the target cellular sequences. After all mutations are introduced, both plasmids should be cured. Unfortunately, the pCas9cr4 plasmid lacks an inherent curing mechanism, so Reisch and Prather pioneered a plasmid curing mechanism by introducing a pKDsgRNA whose sgRNA is complement to the pCas9cr4 plasmid. Specifically, they constructed a pKDsg-p15A which targeted the p15A origin of replication of the pCas9cr4 plasmid. After recombinants were selected for, expression of Cas9 and sgRNA was induced with the addition of aTc. After plating on selective plates and growing at 37 °C, they observed no colony formation on the LB plates containing chloramphenicol indicating loss of the pCas9cr4 plasmid due to a Cas9-mediated double strand break in the plasmid. Additional plasmid mini-preps demonstrated that neither plasmid was retained in the cells, therefore indicating plasmid curing. This technique can easily be applied to curing other plasmids as well.

=== Recombinations ===
Oligonucleotides used for subsequent recombinations should follow several guidelines to help maximize success.

First, optimal oligo length for the transfected linear DNA should be between 60 and 90 base pairs. This guideline is based on previous observations that this length has the highest allelic replacement efficiency. Longer oligos are prone to forming hairpin structures that are not only inhibitory, but also are more expensive to synthesize. Shorter oligos have lower hybridization energies, resulting in decreased stability of the oligo to the chromosomal target. Of this sequence, at least 15 base pairs should be homologous to the target sequence at both the 5' and 3' ends to provide sufficient oligo annealing.

Another consideration is the inclusion of phosphorothioate bonds. In a phosphorothioate bond, one of the non-bridging oxygens between nucleotide bases is replaced with a sulfur atom, changing the chemical properties. This modification is necessary in oligo design because it results in decreased susceptibility to exonuclease degradation. At maximum, four of these bonds should be situated near the 5' end of the oligo. Too many phosphorothioate bonds can be problematic; each modified site creates a chiral center, which can lead to a racemic mixture of isomers with varying characteristics and properties.

Further optimization can be achieved by designing oligos that target the lagging strand in DNA replication because targeting the lagging strand results in a higher frequency of recombinants. In DNA replication, RNA primers must be inserted along the lagging strand so that DNA polymerase is able to synthesize the strand in the 5' to 3' direction. This discontinuous synthesis results in the lagging strand being more exposed which allows for easier beta-mediated annealing of the oligo to the target DNA than when compared to annealing to the leading strand.

Finally, the mismatch repair (MMR) machinery offers inherent protection to the cell against nucleotide base mismatch. Therefore, any mutations introduced in the oligonucleotides can be targeted by the MMR. There are several ways to avoid this. First, the use of an E. coli strain that is MMR deficient will eradicate this issue. However, this also results in a higher rate of other random mutations throughout the genome. Another method to reduce mismatch repair is to bury the mutations of interest within other silent mutations. Since silent mutations do not often cause catastrophic effects, they are poorly detected by the MMR machinery. The presence of modified bases will also help to evade the MMR machinery because they are not recognized. Finally, long segments of mutations will be less affected by short segments of mutations.

Transformed oligonucleotides are incorporated into the cellular DNA through λ-red- and Cas9 endonuclease-mediated homologous recombination. λ-red is activated when arabinose binds to expressed AraC, inducing dimerization of the AraC protein and subsequent DNA binding to activate the promoter prior to oligonucleotide transfection. This step is followed by induced expression of the Cas9 nuclease and the sgRNA through binding of anhydrotetracycline to the P_{TET} promoter. Cas9, with the guidance of the transformed sgRNA, identifies the E. coli complement target sequence and initiates a double strand break. One crucial aspect is that the target gene must be in close proximity upstream of the PAM sequence. Fortunately, the PAM NGG sequence occurs at 424,651 instances on both strands of the E. coli chromosome, so this method is not limited in its targeted specificity.

Meanwhile, dimerized λ gam binds to the host RecBCD and SbcCD nucleases, inhibiting all of their known activities, which prevents degradation of the linear foreign DNA. λ exo binds to double stranded linear transformed DNA and processively degrades it in a 5' to 3' direction. Exo is a globular, trimeric protein that forms a ring shape with a hollow center that positions the linear DNA for cleavage. One side of the ring is large enough to admit double stranded DNA, but the other end can only accommodate single stranded DNA, therefore providing details into the exo mechanism of action. This process results in single stranded 3' overhangs on the linear DNA. Subsequently, λ beta, a member of a recombinase family, binds to the 3' overhangs and mediates annealing to the complementary E. coli DNA. This process occurs through invasion of the single stranded 3' overhang into the complementary target DNA on the lagging strand during DNA synthesis, allowing beta-facilitated annealing.

In summary, this protocol allows for almost unlimited genome targeting provided that one stipulation is considered: this method is limited to targeting E. coli sequences that are located directly upstream of a PAM NGG sequence, so experiments must be designed that accommodate this restriction.

=== PCR screen ===
Once colonies are selected, transformants are genotyped using allele specific PCR. In this process, a mutant PCR primer is used to select for the mutant over the wild-type genotype. If the mutant genotype is present, it anneals to the 3' end of the PCR primer while the wild-type genotype results in mismatched DNA at the 3' end. The mismatch between the 3' end of the primer and wild-type prevents primer extension and thus, only the mutant genotype produces a PCR product. Hotstart Taq polymerase lacking 3' to 5' exonuclease activity was used for colony PCR of the putative mutants.

The SCAR-less method is able to induce point mutations, oligonucleotide-mediated deletions, and short sequence insertions with a high efficiency. In the case of point mutations, oligonucleotides targeted to the lagging strand are designed to alter the either the PAM sequence or the protospacer sequences within 12 base pairs of the PAM as this is the most important region for Cas9 specificity. With this process, both nonsense and missense mutations are possible. However, the subsequent transformations differ between nonsense and missense mutations: double transformations, where the pCas9cr4 plasmid and oligonucleotide are transformed simultaneously, are more efficient for nonsense mutations while single transformations, where each plasmid and oligonucleotide are transformed independently, are better suited for missense mutations as demonstrated by colony PCR. The method is also able to successfully delete large regions of chromosomal DNA using oligonucleotides designed with upstream and downstream homology to the area of deletion. In the case of deletions, a single transformation protocol is more efficient and shows a 100% deletion rate following colony PCR. Further work should be pursued to determine causes for the different transformation efficiencies for various mutation types.

Short sequence insertions are also possible using the SCAR-less method. In order to circumvent oligonucleotide length constraints, linear dsDNA sequences are used to insert fragments into the chromosome. Because the system uses a plasmid that expresses the exo and gam genes from the λ-red system it is able to use oligonucleotide recombineering techniques for sequence insertion. More specifically, the dsDNA strands facilitate insertion through the mechanism of single-strand intermediates at the replication fork. Previous methods were successful in inserting 30bp into the chromosome while the SCAR-less method was able to insert a sequence ten times greater (300bp). More importantly, PCR screens identified a 100% insertion rate in three separate experiments. Although recombination efficiency decreases over time, the SCAR-less method is expected to successfully facilitate insertions of over 1 kB sequence.

=== Limitations ===
The current system is not able to simultaneously select against more than one target as a result of difficulties in DNA synthesis and ligation independent cloning methods. Essentially this means that the highly repetitive sequences necessary for multiple sgRNA in a single plasmid are constrained by flaws in the biological machinery necessary to express them and target them to more than one target. Future improvements are necessary to allow simultaneous genomic manipulations using several distinct sgRNA in a single plasmid.

Challenges underlying plasmid recombination and loss of protospacer sequences also impact the no-SCAR method and require further improvements. Poor plasmid recombination underlies frequency of escape difficulties that may impact the efficiency of genetic manipulation.

== Applications ==
=== Research ===
The no-SCAR method is more efficient than standard cloning techniques including ssDNA recombineering as well as other scar-free genome editing techniques. The method allows for unlimited numbers of single step genomic alterations without the use of selectable markers. The great advantage of the method, specifically in terms research applications, is the speed of the protocol. In the seminal paper by Reisch and Prather, the no-SCAR method required 5 days of work including the cloning step necessary for sgRNA targeting. Once the cells contain the pCas9cr4 plasmid, subsequent experiments can be completed in as little as 3 days allowing for rapid genome editing. Currently, the no-SCAR method is faster than any other method published and is an attractive option for researchers interested in studying the effects of numerous modifications.

When compared specifically to other scar-free genome editing techniques including the method published by Datsenko and Wanner, the no-SCAR method is less time-consuming when multiple mutations are desired. Two components of the method mediate this rapid mutation ability. First, the pCas9cr4 plasmid is retained in the cells after the first iteration thus preventing repetitive transfection of the plasmid into the cells. In instances where three genome modifications are desired, for example , this means that the no-SCAR method is able to mediate these mutations four days faster than the next fastest method. Second, the wild-type gene is never removed from the chromosome. This means that PCR screening is able to more quickly identify numerous mutants because essential wild-type genes can be targeted with ease.

=== Human health ===
The discovery of the CRISPR/Cas9 genome editing system has revolutionized genetic research. In terms of human health, it has applications to both specific diseases as well as stem cell systems that model these same diseases. In stem cell research, the CRISPR system has been successfully applied to a wide spectrum of diseases. Mutations in transcriptional repressor CTCF from cultured intestinal stem cells of cystic fibrosis patients were corrected using CRISPR/Cas. Subsequent applications built upon simple sequence corrections and successfully repaired a chromosomal inversion abnormality in Hemophilia A. Both applications demonstrate the utility of pairing CRISPR/Cas with stem cell models in the study and treatment of genetic disease. With the advent of patient-derived induced pluripotent stem cells (iPSCs), the applicability of CRISPR/Cas is further strengthened. To date, CRISPR methods have successfully repaired disease-associated genetic mutations in 1) metabolic disorders such as β-thalassemia, 2) immunological deficiencies such as severe combined immunodeficiency (SCID) and 3) neuromuscular diseases such as Duchenne muscular dystrophy. The corrections of these genetic mutations, more importantly, are potential future vehicles for cell and gene therapies where the patient's own repaired stem cells can be re-implanted. The no-SCAR method, as an improvement of the CRISPR/Cas system, will play an important role in modeling human disease using iPS cells and in the future treating these same diseases.
