= Coelosphaeriaceae =

Scientific classification
- Domain: Bacteria
- Phylum: Cyanobacteria
- Class: Cyanophyceae
- Order: Synechococcales
- Family: Coelosphaeriaceae; Elenkin

Genera
- Coelomoron Buell 1938; Coelosphaeriopsis Lemmermann 1900; Coelosphaerium Nägeli 1849; Siphonosphaera Hindák 1988; Snowella Elenkin 1938; Woronichinia Elenkin 1933

Family of bacteria

The Coelosphaeriaceae are a family of cyanobacteria.
