= Synechocystis sp. PCC 6803 =

Scientific classification
- Domain: Bacteria
- Kingdom: Bacillati
- Phylum: Cyanobacteriota
- Class: Cyanophyceae
- Order: Synechococcales
- Family: Merismopediaceae
- Genus: Synechocystis
- Species: S. sp. PCC 6803

Binomial name
- Synechocystis sp. PCC 6803

Synonyms
- Synechocystis sp000284455 GTDB placeholder, 2019 (R89)

Species of bacterium

Synechocystis sp. PCC 6803 is a strain of unicellular, freshwater cyanobacteria. Synechocystis sp. PCC 6803 is capable of both phototrophic growth by oxygenic photosynthesis during light periods and heterotrophic growth by glycolysis and oxidative phosphorylation during dark periods. Gene expression is regulated by a circadian clock and the organism can effectively anticipate transitions between the light and dark phases.

== Evolutionary history ==
Cyanobacteria are photosynthetic prokaryotes that have existed on Earth for an estimated 2.7 billion years. The ability of cyanobacteria to produce oxygen initiated the transition from a planet consisting of high levels of carbon dioxide and little oxygen, to what has been called the Great Oxygenation Event where large amounts of oxygen gas were produced. Cyanobacteria have colonized a wide diversity of habitats, including fresh and salt water ecosystems, and most land environments. Phylogenetically, Synechocystis branches off later in the cyanobacterial evolutionary tree, further from the ancestral root (Gloeobacter violaceus). Synechocystis, which is non-diazotrophic, is related to other model cyanobacteria that can fix nitrogen. Thus, it has been proposed that Synechocystis originally possessed the ability to fix nitrogen gas into ammonia, but lost the genes required for a fully functioning nitrogen fixation (nif) gene cluster.

== Growth and use as a model organism ==
Cyanobacteria are model microorganisms for the study of photosynthesis, carbon and nitrogen assimilation, evolution of plant plastids, and adaptability to environmental stresses. Synechocystis sp. PCC 6803 is one of the most highly studied types of cyanobacteria as it can grow both autotrophically or heterotrophically in the absence of light. It was isolated from a freshwater lake in 1968 and grows best between 32 and 38 degrees Celsius. Synechocystis sp. PCC 6803 can readily take up exogenous DNA, in addition to up taking DNA via electroporation, ultrasonic transformation and conjugation. The photosynthetic apparatus is very similar to the one found in land plants. The organism also exhibits phototactic movement.

Synechocystis sp. PCC 6803 can be grown on either agar plates or in liquid culture. The most widely used culture medium is a BG-11 salt solution. The ideal pH is between 7 and 8.5. A light intensity of 50 μmol photons m^{−2} s^{−1} leads to best growth. Bubbling with carbon dioxide enriched air (1–2% CO_{2}) can increase the growth rate, but may require additional buffer to maintain pH

Selection is typically performed by antibiotic resistance genes. Heidorn et al. 2011 experimentally determined in Synechocystis sp. PCC 6803 the ideal concentrations of kanamycin, spectinomycin, streptomycin, chloramphenicol, erythromycin, and gentamicin. Cultures can be kept on agar plates for approximately 2 weeks and re-streaked indefinitely. For long term storage, liquid cell cultures should be stored in a 15% glycerol solution at -80 degrees Celsius.

== Genome ==
The genome of Synechocystis sp. PCC 6803 is contained within approximately 12 copies of a single chromosome (3.57 megabases), three small plasmids: pCC5.2 (5.2 kb) pCA2.4 (2.4 kb), and pCB2.4 (2.4 kb) and four large plasmids: pSYSM (120 kb), pSYSX (106 kb), pSYSA (103kb), and pSYSG (44 kb). The genome of Synechocystis sp. PCC 6803 is the fourth genome to be completely sequenced, and the first phototrophic organism to have its genome fully sequenced.

== Additional strains ==
The primary strain of Synechocystis sp. is PCC 6803. Further modifications of the parent PCC 6803 strain have been created, such as a sub-strain lacking photosystem 1 (PSI). The other widely used sub-strain of Synechocystis sp. is a glucose tolerant strain, ATCC 27184. The parent PCC 6803 strain cannot utilize external glucose.

== Light-activated heterotrophy ==
Synechocystis sp. PCC 6803, sub-strain ATCC 27184 can live heterotrophically in the dark on the carbon source glucose, but for yet unknown reasons requires a minimum of 5 to 15 minutes (blue) light per day. This regulatory role of light is intact in both PSI and PSII deficient strains.

Some glycolytic genes are regulated by the gene sll1330 under light and glucose-supplemented conditions. One of the most important glycolytic genes is fructose-1,6-bisphosphate aldolase (fbaA). The mRNA level of fbaA is increased under light and glucose-supplemented conditions.

== Native CRISPR-Cas system ==
The CRISPR-Cas (Clustered Regularly Interspaced Short Palindrome Repeats – CRISPR associated proteins) system provides adaptive immunity in archaea and bacteria. Synechocystis sp. PCC 6803 contains three different CRISPR-Cas systems: type I-D, and two versions of type III. All three CRISPR-Cas systems are localize on the pSYSA plasmid. All cyanobacteria are lacking the type II system, which has been widely adapted for genetic engineering purposes across many species.

== RNA polymerase and sigma factors ==
RNA polymerase (RNAP) and sigma factors are necessary proteins for transcription of DNA into messenger RNA (mRNA). Eubacterial RNAP holoenzymes consist of a core with four major subunits α2 ββ'. In cyanobacteria, β' is formed from two smaller subunits (у and β'), which corresponds to RNAPs in plant chloroplasts. The beta subunits are responsible for binding the RNAP to the DNA, preventing premature dissociation. In Escherichia coli, the beta "clamp" first binds loosely and tightens as the RNAP approaches the start codon (AUG). In cyanobacteria, the beta clamp binds tightly at initial binding. The effect of this difference is that synthetic repressible promoters do not function as expected in Synechocystis sp. PCC 6803. In E. coli, a repressor binds the DNA operon and dislodges RNAP due to the loosely bound beta clamp, whereas in Synechocystis, the RNAP is tightly bound leading the reverse phenomenon where the repressor is knocked off the DNA. Thus the gene is not effectively repressed. Synechocystis possesses the 70S sigma factor (σ70), which can be divided into three groups. Group 1 sigma factors are critical for cell viability. Group 2, similar in structure to Group 1, is not essential for cell vitality. Group 3 is structurally different and involved with survival under stress conditions. Synechocystis sp. PCC 6803 lacks the σN factor found in other organisms, such as Escherichia coli, which is involved with transcribing genes related to nitrogen, but is nonetheless able to metabolize nitrogen.

== Natural genetic transformation ==
Synechocystis sp. PCC 6803 is capable of natural genetic transformation. For transformation to take place, the recipient bacteria must be in a competent state. A gene, comF, was shown to be involved in competence development in Synechocystis sp. PCC 6803.

== Synthetic biology/genetic engineering ==
Synechocystis sp. PCC 6803 is considered a model organism, yet there exist few synthetic parts that can be used for genetic engineering. As cyanobacteria in general have slow doubling times (4.5 to 5 h in Synechocystis sp. PCC 6301), it is more efficient to perform as much DNA cloning as possible in a fast growing host, such as Escherichia coli. In order to create plasmids—stable, replicating circular pieces of DNA—that will function successfully in multiple species, a broad-host-range shuttle vector (see Replicative Plasmids below) is needed. Gene promoters, which control gene expression, need to also predictably work in multiple hosts (see Promoters below).

=== Replicative plasmids ===
Currently there is only one broad-host-range shuttle vector, RSF1010, that successfully replicates in Synechocystis sp. PCC 6803. RSF1010 is a mobilization plasmid that facilitates conjugation between cells, allowing the horizontal gene transfer of DNA. Additionally, RSF1010 encodes its own replication machinery, so that it does not depend on its host to possess the necessary proteins and assorted factors.

=== Promoters ===
Gene promoters are responsible for recruiting RNAP and facilitating transcription of DNA. Type I promoters consists of a consensus -35 and -10 region (Pribnow box) upstream of the gene start site. Heidorn et al. 2011 compiled a list of native Synechocystis sp. PCC 6803 promoters that have been used in synthetic constructs, although this leads to cross talk and non-orthogonal or non-specific gene expression. A handful of Anderson promoters (a group of constitutive promoters collected from a combinatorial library based on the consensus -35 (5'-TTGACA-3') and -10 (5'-TATAAT-3') regions), represented best by BBa_J23101, have been demonstrated to function in Synechocystis sp. PCC 6803. The iGem Registry hosts these promoter sequences as part of the BioBrick initiative to create interchangeable genetic parts. For synthetic biology, it is critical to have inducible promoters, or genes that can be turned on/off on demand. Several popular inducible promoters in E. coli are the pBad, pTet, and pLac promoters, all of which repress gene expression by a repressor molecule that binds the gene operator and blocks RNAP progression.

Progress in engineering Synechocystis sp. PCC 6803 is currently hampered by promoter issues. As noted above in RNA Polymerase and Sigma Factors, the beta clamp proteins within the RNAP complex have a higher initial binding affinity in Synechocystis sp. versus other eubacterial models. Thus promoters that turn on/off in response to small binding molecules are less effective in Synechocystis since the RNAP can knock them off the DNA strand. Camsund, Heidorn and Lindblad 2014 attempted to enhance pLac repression in Synechocystis sp. PCC 6803 by engineering a promoter with multiple operons, thus facilitating DNA looping. Their attempt was too effective, as it was now too difficult to induce transcription in highly repressed variants. Huang and Lindblad 2013 created a library of modified pTet promoters with varying levels of repression and dynamic range in the glucose tolerant Synechocystis sp. ATCC 27184. Another option are promoters that are inducible by heavy metals, such as: zinc, cadmium, cobalt, arsenic, nickel and chromium. Several such promoters were evaluated in Synechocystis sp. PCC 6803 by Peca 2007. These promoters are not ideal, as metal ions are critical in Synechocystis' metabolic pathways and altering concentrations can lead to compounding undesired side effects. Additionally, working with these promoters produces waste contaminated with heavy metals, increasing disposal costs

=== Ribosome binding site (RBS) ===
The ribosome binding site (RBS) is the location where a ribosome binds a strand of mRNA and begins translation. In prokaryotes, the RBS includes a Shine-Dalgarno sequence. Little is known about the translation efficiency of RBSs in Synechocystis sp. PCC 6803. Heidorn et al. 2011 scanned the Synechocystis sp. PCC 6803 genome and created a consensus RBS sequence (TAGTGGAGGT), which had 5 times higher output than the consensus E. coli sequence.

=== Terminators ===
Terminators are the DNA signal which halts transcription. Native Synechocystis sp. PCC 6803 termination sites have been characterized.

=== Transcription unit (TU) ===
Transcription units (TUs) of Synechocystis sp. PCC 6803 have been assigned using transcription start sites (TSSs) and transcript 3'-end positions (TEPs).

== Biofuel production ==
Cyanobacteria have been used in several ways to produce renewable biofuel. The original method was to grow cyanobacteria for the biomass, which could be converted through liquefaction into liquid fuel. Current estimates suggest that biofuel production from cyanobacteria is unfeasible, as the energy return on energy invested (EROEI) is unfavorable. The EROEI is not advantageous as numerous large, closed loop bioreactors with ideal growth conditions (sunlight, fertilizers, concentrated carbon dioxide, oxygen) need to be constructed and operated, which consumes fossil fuels. Additionally, further post processing of cyanobacterial products is necessary, which requires additional fossil fuels. Nevertheless, it has been demonstrated that the land use efficiency of the direct conversion of CO2 to biofuels with cyanobacteria is considerably higher than for the production in two-step processes involving substrate production by plants and subsequent conversion to biofuel by chemoheterotrophic hosts.

Synechocystis sp. PCC 6803 has been used as a model to increase cyanobacterial energy yields through genetic engineering by the following manipulations: broadening the range of photosynthetic light absorption, altering antenna size in photosystem II, increasing bicarbonate uptake, modifying the Rubisco enzyme to increase carbon fixation, and introduction of biofuel producing metabolic pathways. It is not yet clear whether cyanobacterial biofuels will be a viable future alternative to non-renewable fossil fuels.

== Databases ==
- SynechoNET: integrated protein-protein interaction database of a model cyanobacterium Synechocystis sp. PCC 6803. SynechoNET is a specialized cyanobacterial protein-protein interaction database. It shows feasible cyanobacterial domain-domain interactions, as well as their protein level interactions using the model cyanobacterium, Synechocystis sp. PCC 6803. Additionally, SynechoNET provides transmembrane topology and domain information, as well as interaction networks in graphical web interfaces.
- CyanoBase: Cyanobacteria carry a complete set of genes for oxygenic photosynthesis, which is the most fundamental life process on Earth. This organism is also interesting from an evolutionary viewpoint, for it arose in a very ancient age and has survived in various environments. The algal and land plant chloroplast evolved from cyanobacterial ancestors which developed an endosymbiotic relationship with a eukaryotic host cell. CyanoBase provides an easy way of accessing the sequences and all-inclusive annotation data on the structures of the cyanobacterial genomes. This database was originally developed by Makoto Hirosawa, Takakazu Kaneko and Satoshi Tabata, and the current version of CyanoBase has been developed and maintained by Yasukazu Nakamura, Takakazu Kaneko, and Satoshi Tabata at Kazusa DNA Research Institute.
- STRING: STRING is a database of known and predicted protein-protein interactions. The interactions include direct (physical) and indirect (functional) associations; they are derived from four sources: Genomic Context, High-throughput Experiments, (Conserved) Coexpression, and Previous Knowledge. The database currently contains 1,513,782 proteins in 373 species. Especially, the database provides interactions for Synechocystis sp. PCC 6803.
- cTFbase: cTFbase contains 1288 putative transcription factors (TFs) identified from 21 fully sequenced cyanobacterial genomes. Through its user-friendly interactive interface, users can employ various criteria to retrieve all TF sequences and their detailed annotation information, including sequence features, domain architecture and sequence similarity against the linked databases. Furthermore, cTFbase also provides phylogenetic trees of individual TF family, multiple sequence alignments of the DNA-binding domain and ortholog identification from any selected genomes.
- BiGG Models: The BiGG Models database provides a standardized platform for accessing genome-scale metabolic reconstructions, including iJN678. This model represents the metabolic network of the cyanobacterium Synechocystis sp. PCC 6803 and includes 678 genes associated with reactions involved in key processes such as photosynthesis, carbon fixation, and energy metabolism. It supports systems-level analysis of metabolic fluxes, enabling simulations of growth under varying environmental conditions, such as changes in carbon dioxide availability and light intensity, as well as gene essentiality analyses to identify pathways that optimize biomass production.
