= Aphanocapsa elachista =

Scientific classification
- Domain: Bacteria
- Phylum: Cyanobacteria
- Class: Cyanophyceae
- Order: Synechococcales
- Family: Merismopediaceae
- Genus: Aphanocapsa
- Species: A. elachista

Binomial name
- Aphanocapsa elachista West & G.S.West, 1894

Species of bacterium

Aphanocapsa elachista is a species of Cyanobacteria belonging to the family Merismopediaceae.

Synonyms:

- Microcystis pulverea f. elachista (West & G.S.West) Elenkin 1938
- Microcystis elachista (West & G.S.West) Starmach 1966
- Aphanocapsa elachista var. planctonica G.M.Smith 1920
