= Lago della Serraia =

Lake in Trentino, Italy

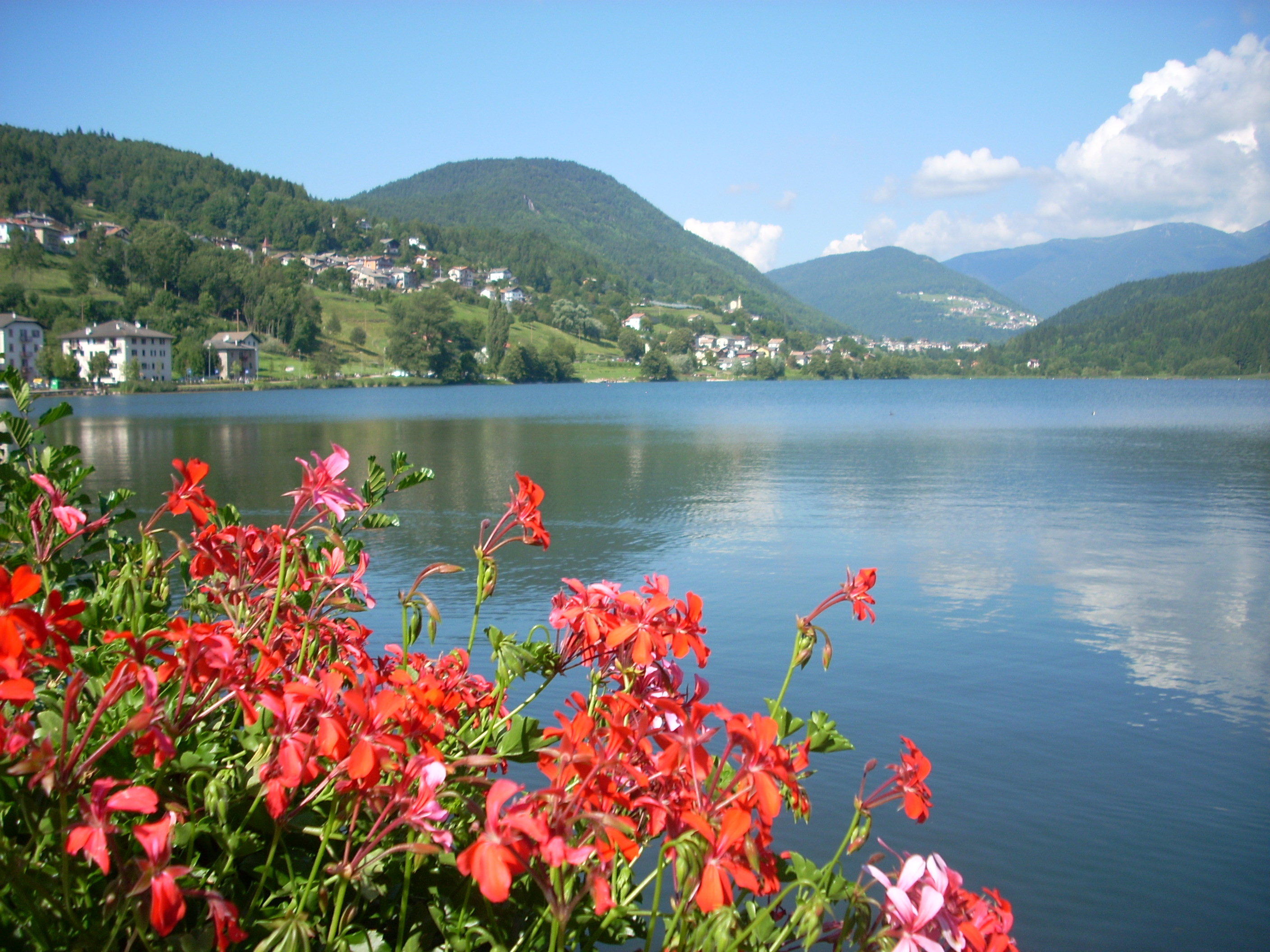

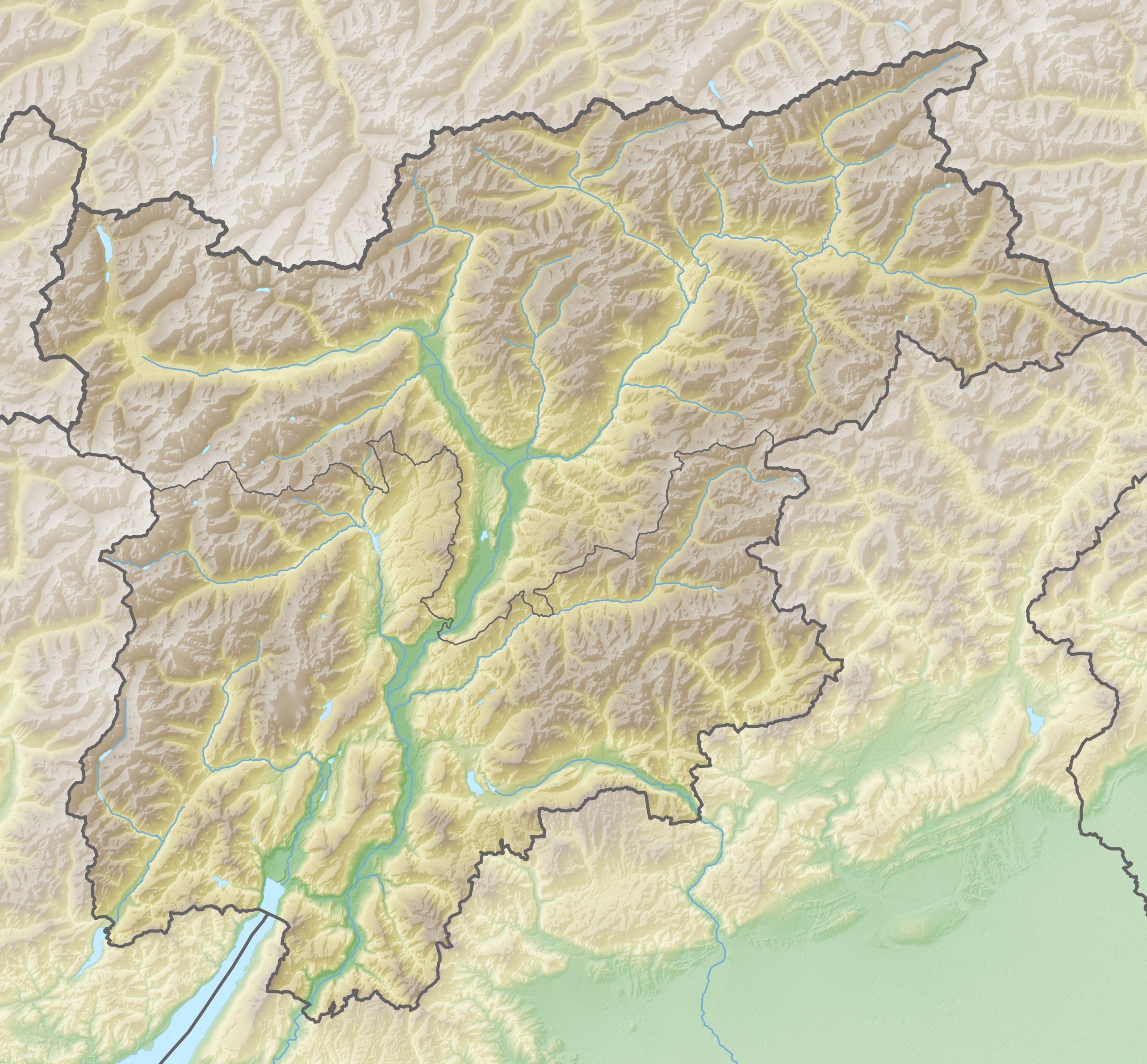
- Location within Trentino-Alto Adige/Südtirol
- Location: Trentino
- Coordinates: 46°08′12″N 11°15′18″E
- Primary outflows: Silla
- Basin countries: Italy
- Surface area: 0.45 km^{2} (0.17 sq mi)
- Surface elevation: 974 m (3,196 ft)

Lago della Serraia is a lake in Trentino, Italy on the Piné plateau. At an elevation of 974 m, its surface area is 0.45 km^{2}. A hiking path around the lake also circles Lago delle Piazze. In 2007, the Mai Zeder running team held the third 24-hour ultramarathon, which started at Lago della Serraia.

A decade-long water monitoring study, published in 2025, identified the occurrence of potentially toxic algal blooms in the lake, notably Microcystis aeruginosa.
