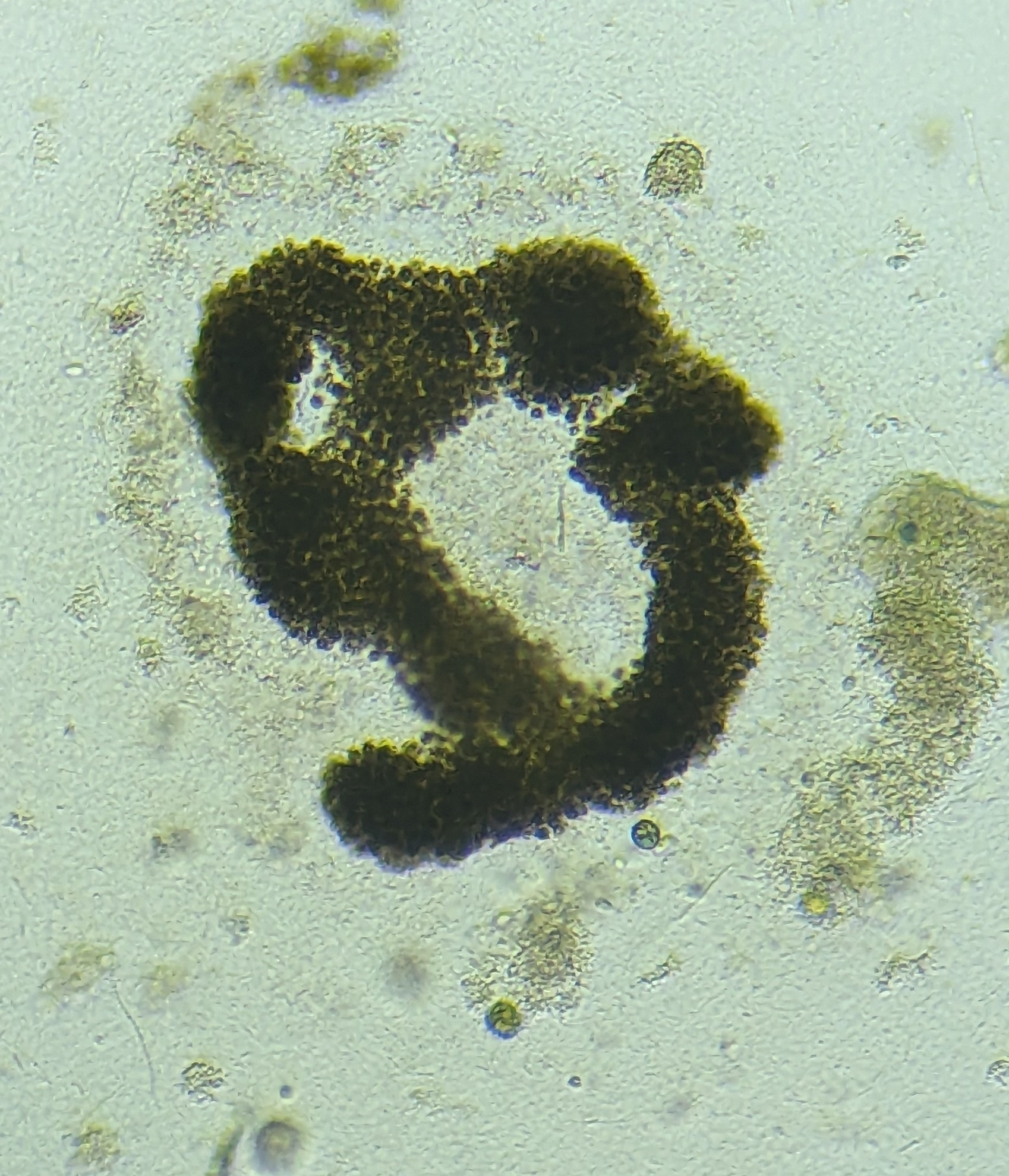
- Microcystis aeruginosa

Scientific classification
- Domain: Bacteria
- Kingdom: Bacillati
- Phylum: Cyanobacteriota
- Class: Cyanophyceae
- Order: Chroococcales
- Family: Microcystaceae
- Genus: Microcystis; Kützing, 1833

Species
- Many (see below)

= Microcystis =

Genus of bacteria

Microcystis is a genus of freshwater cyanobacteria that includes the harmful algal bloom-forming Microcystis aeruginosa.

Over the last few decades, cyanobacterial blooms caused by eutrophication have become a major environmental problem in aquatic ecosystems worldwide, and the most representative and harmful cyanobacteria is Microcystis. Microcystis blooms have increased due to global climate change, spanning six continents and causing increased health risks to wildlife and humans.

This article will address the conditions for the growth of Microcystis, physical characteristics, ecology, geographic distribution, and health risks of Microcystis.

== Conditions for Microcystis ==
During the summer in temperate systems, Microcystis can rise to form blooms on the water surface. These blooms, linked to anthropogenic nutrient loading, occur generally when water temperatures exceed 15 °C. But, as the global climate changes, the intensity and occurrence of the blooms is expected to increase.

== Physical characteristics ==
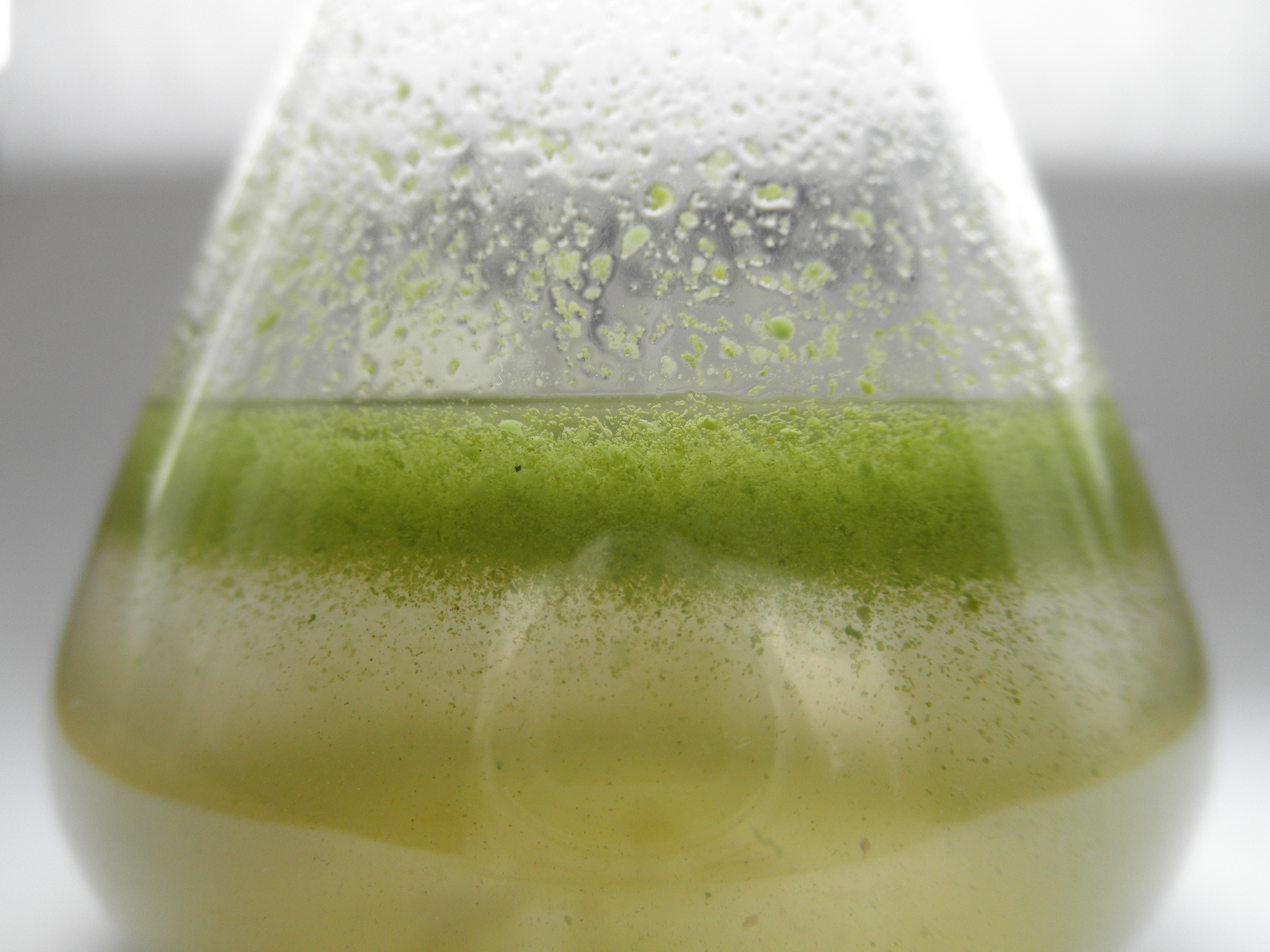
Microcystis floating colonies in an Erlenmeyer flask

The genus Microcystis derives from the Greek mikros (small) + kystis (bladder).

As the etymological derivation implies, Microcystis is characterized by small cells (a few micrometers in diameter), possessing gas-filled vesicles (also lacking individual sheaths). The cells are usually organized into colonies (aggregations of which are visible with the naked eye) that begin in a spherical shape, losing coherence to become perforated or irregularly shaped over time. These colonies are bound by a thick mucilage composed of complex polysaccharide compounds, including xylose, mannose, glucose, fucose, galactose, and rhamnose, among other compounds.

The coloration of the protoplast is a light blue-green, appearing dark or brown due to optical effects of gas-filled vesicles.

== Ecology ==
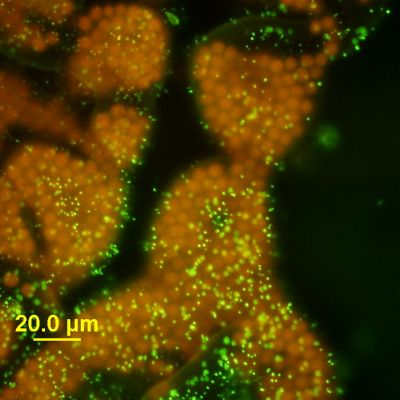
Microcystis wesenbergii colony under epifluorescence microscopy with SYTOX Green DNA staining

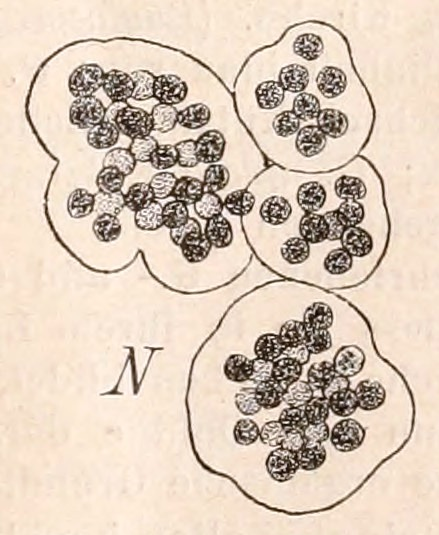
Microcystis floas-aquae Kirch.

Microcystis is capable of producing large surface blooms through a combination of rapid division and buoyancy regulation by production of gas-filled vesicles. In nature, Microcystis can exist as single cells or in large colonies containing many cells. Their ability to regulate buoyancy is one of the keys to their dominance of eutrophic waters, by optimally positioning themselves within the photic zone in a stable water column.

Because they can form large surface blooms, they are thought to be able to out-compete other phytoplankton by monopolizing light in the photic zone.

Microcystis spp. are also capable of efficient uptake of phosphate and nitrogen; they are believed to be strongly influenced by nitrogen to phosphorus ratios (N:P ratio). Microcystis cells are also efficient at assimilating carbon from their environment; during large blooms, rampant photosynthesis can drive the pH of communities to > 9.0. Recent efforts have suggested a combination of effective carbon-concentrating mechanisms and a potential ability to use urea as both a carbon and nitrogen source allows Microcystis to persist under these high-pH conditions.

Yuhao Song et al evaluated the relationship between phosphorus sources and Microcystis. This study was essential in building an understanding of the ecological risks of cyanobacterial blooms. These scientists were able to find the following relationships between Microcystis and phosphorus sources: interactions between phosphorus and Microcystis determine the outbreak of Microcystis blooms, different phosphorus conditions affect Microcystis growth and resistance to harmful factors, and Microcystis can drive the distribution of phosphorus sources in aquatic environments. They also concluded that the understanding of endogenous phosphorus should be broadened and more attention should be focused on metabolic processes related to Microcystis cells to provide more support and understanding in control and management of Microcystis blooms.

== Geographic distribution ==
The toxic cyanobacterial blooms are expected to become more widespread with climate change because water stratification and increasing temperature favor bloom-forming cyanobacteria. Microcystis is widespread in temperate and subtropical lakes, reservoirs, and rivers in at least 108 countries on six continents.

In South Africa, Hartbeespoort Dam is highly impacted by Microcystis because of elevated phosphate and nitrate levels flowing from the sewers of Johannesburg, one of the few cities in the world that straddles a continental watershed divide, so lies upstream of major dams and rivers.

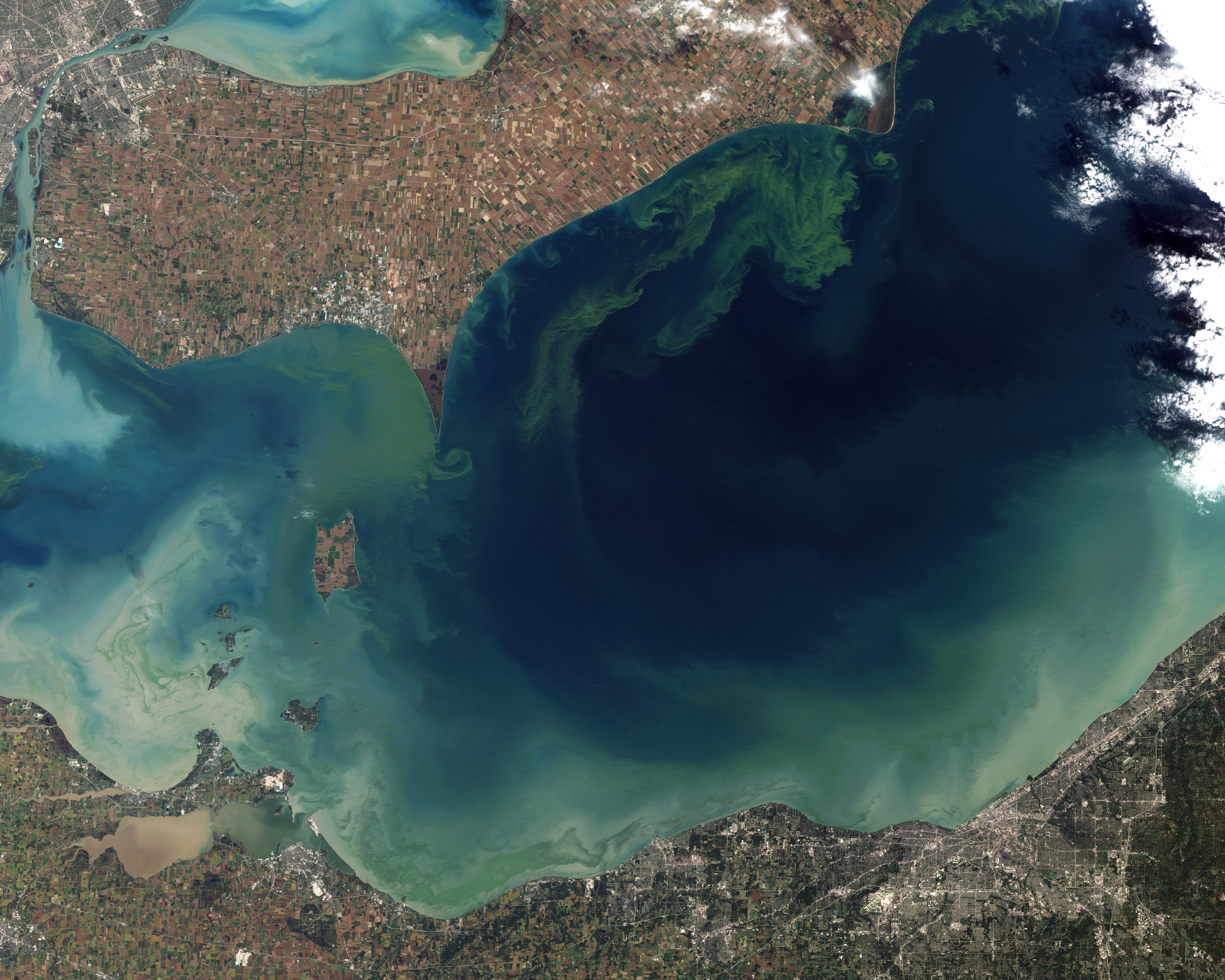
Lake Erie contains Microcystis algae blooms

In North America, Microcystis blooms have caused issues in numerous freshwater systems over the last two decades. These include large lakes (Erie, Okeechobee) and small regional water masses like Ohio's Grand Lake St Marys. In 2014, detection of the microcystin toxin in treated water of Toledo (OH) resulted in a shutdown of the water supply to more than 400,000 residents. The breakthrough of the toxin in the system was linked to the presence of a virus that lysed cells and released the toxin out of particles into the dissolved phase.

== Health risks ==
Cyanobacteria can produce neurotoxins and hepatotoxins, such as microcystin and cyanopeptolin. The potent hepatotoxin poses a risk to those who use impaired water resources for drinking water supplies, recreational activities, and fisheries. Microcystins are the only cyanotoxins that the World Health Organization has set drinking and recreational water standards.

Countless fatalities and severe poisonings of livestock, wildlife, and pets have been caused by Microcystis blooms. Microcystin-containing Microcystis has also caused human illness via direct consumption of drinking water and accidental ingestion of water or skin contact during recreational use of water. The most severe case of human poisoning took place in Brazil in 1996, when a bloom of Microcystis in a drinking reservoir caused 56 fatalities.

Microcystis has also been reported to produce a compound (or compounds) that can have endocrine-disrupting effects. In 2018, the Great Lakes Center for Fresh Waters and Human Health was founded at Bowling Green State University with a focus on problems associated with Microcystis blooms in the Great Lakes. Under the leadership of inaugural director George S. Bullerjahn, the center engages scientists from nine institutions across six states, and is supported by combined funding from the National Science Foundation and National Institute of Environmental Health Sciences.

== Species ==
Microcystis species include:

- Microcystis aeruginosa
- Microcystis argentea
- Microcystis botrys
- Microcystis elongata
- Microcystis flos-aquae
- Microcystis holsatica
- Microcystis lutescens
- Microcystis marina
- Microcystis pallida
- Microcystis panniformis
- Microcystis salina
- Microcystis thermalis
- Microcystis viridis
- Microcystis wesenbergii

== Phylogeny ==
Phylogeny per GTDB Release 10-RS226 (April 2025). Genomes labelled to belong to some species (especially M. aeruginosa) actually span several phylogenetically disjoint species-level clusters, as indicated by the added suffixes.

- 100
  - Microcystis 100
    - 45
      - 18
        - 8
          - 11
            - 13
              - 4
                - 9
                  - 10
                    - 33
                      - 53
                        - M. aeruginosa_I
                        - M. novacekii
                      - M. aeruginosa_F
                    - M. aeruginosa_D
                  - M. aeruginosa_H
                - M. panniformis_A
              - 10
                - 31
                  - 64
                    - M. sp002282935
                    - M. viridis
                  - M. wesenbergii_B
                - M. aeruginosa_E
            - 13
              - M. aeruginosa
              - M. panniformis
          - M. wesenbergii_A
        - M. sp020245945
      - 73
        - M. sp000297435
        - M. aeruginosa_C
    - M. aeruginosa_G
  - Pannus brasiliensis
- Chroococcopsis gigantea

== See also ==
- Pandorina (Analogy)
- Lake Erie
- Lake Okeechobee
- Hartebeestpoort Dam
