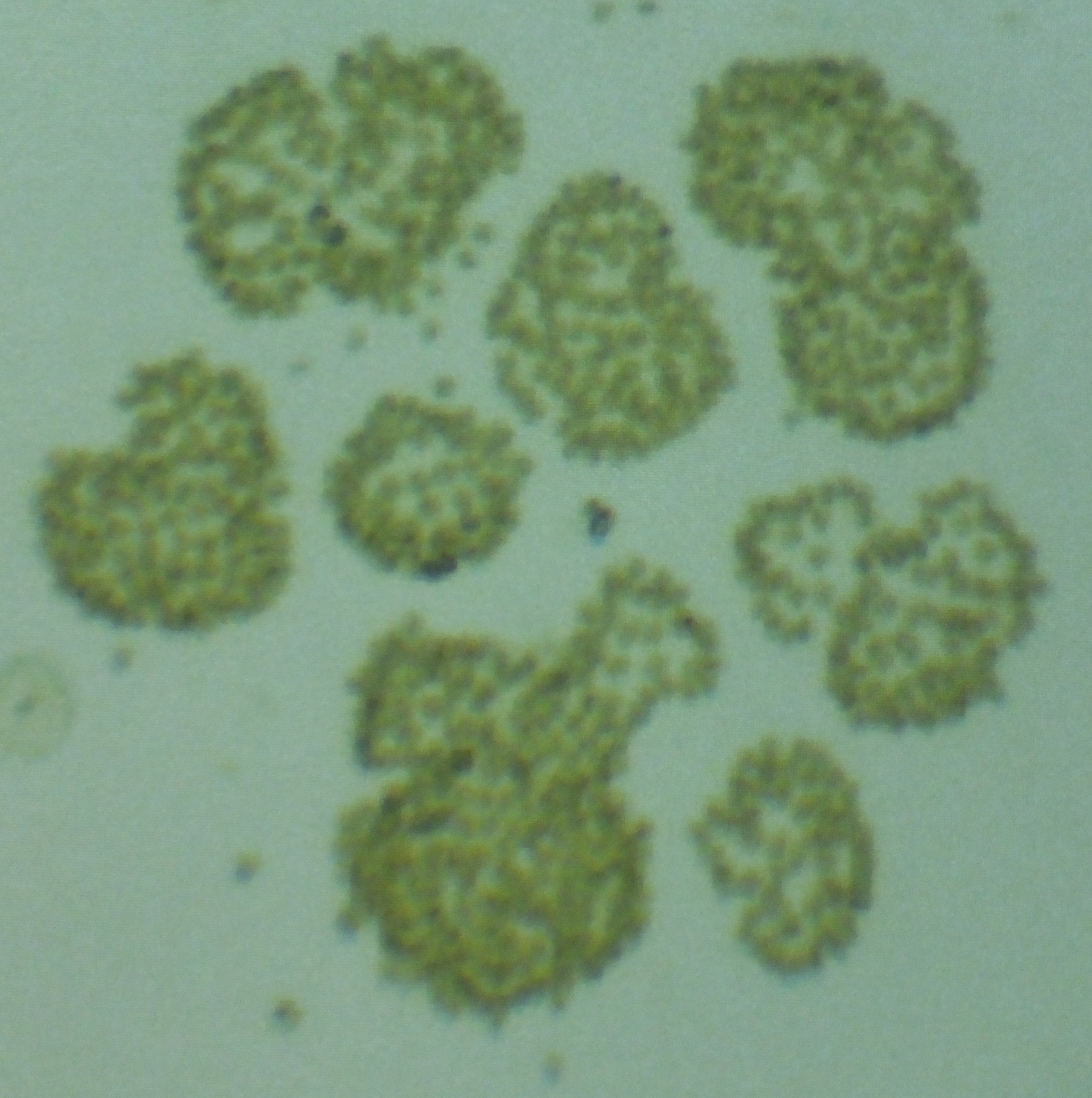

Scientific classification
- Domain: Bacteria
- Phylum: Cyanobacteria
- Class: Cyanophyceae
- Order: Synechococcales
- Family: Coelosphaeriaceae
- Genus: Woronichinia; A.A.Elenkin

= Woronichinia =

Genus of cyanobacteria

Woronichinia is a genus of cyanobacteria, belonging to the family Coelosphaeriaceae.

The genus was described in 1933 by Alexander Elenkin and is named after the Russian microbiologist N. N. Woronichin (1882—1956).

The genus is native to Europe and Northern America.

Species:

- Woronichinia botrys (Skuja) Komárek & Hindák, 1988
- Woronichinia compacta (Lemmermann) Komárek & Hindák, 1988
- Woronichinia delicatula (Skuja) Komárek & Hindák, 1988
- Woronichinia elorantae Komárek & Komárková-Legnerová, 1992
- Woronichinia fremyi (Komárek) Komárek & Hindák, 1988
- Woronichinia fusca (Skuja) Komárek & Hindák, 1988
- Woronichinia karelica Komárek & Komárková-Legnerová, 1992
- Woronichinia klingiae Komárek & Komárková-Legnerová, 1992
- Woronichinia kuseliae M.Watanabe & Komárek, 1994
- Woronichinia meiocystis Joosten, 2006
- Woronichinia microcystoides (Komárek) Joosten, 2006
- Woronichinia naegeliana (Unger) Elenkin, 1933
- Woronichinia obtusa Joosten, 2006
- Woronichinia problematica Joosten, 2006
- Woronichinia radians (Hortobágyi) Komárek & Hindák, 1988
- Woronichinia robusta (Skuja) Komárek & Hindák, 1988
- Woronichinia tenera (Skuja) Komárek & Hindák, 1988
