= Recombineering =

Recombineering (recombination-mediated genetic engineering) is a genetic and molecular biology technique based on homologous recombination systems, as opposed to the older/more common method of using restriction enzymes and ligases to combine DNA sequences in a specified order. Recombineering is widely used for bacterial genetics, in the generation of target vectors for making a conditional mouse knockout, and for modifying DNA of any source often contained on a bacterial artificial chromosome (BAC), among other applications.

== Development ==
Although developed in bacteria, much of the inspiration for recombineering techniques came from methods first developed in Saccharomyces cerevisiae where a linear plasmid was used to target genes or clone genes off the chromosome. In addition, recombination with single-strand oligonucleotides (oligos) was first shown in Saccharomyces cerevisiae. Recombination was observed to take place with oligonucleotides as short as 20 bases.

Recombineering is based on homologous recombination in Escherichia coli mediated by bacteriophage proteins, either RecE/RecT from Rac prophage or Redαβδ from bacteriophage lambda. The lambda Red recombination system is now most commonly used and the first demonstrations of Red in vivo genetic engineering were independently made by Kenan Murphy and Francis Stewart. However, Murphy's experiments required expression of RecA and also employed long homology arms. Consequently, the implications for a new DNA engineering technology were not obvious. The Stewart lab showed that these homologous recombination systems mediate efficient recombination of linear DNA molecules flanked by homology sequences as short as 30 base pairs (40-50 base pairs are more efficient) into target DNA sequences in the absence of RecA. Now the homology could be provided by oligonucleotides made to order, and standard recA cloning hosts could be used, greatly expanding the utility of recombineering.

== Recombineering with dsDNA ==
Recombineering utilizes linear DNA substrates that are either double-stranded (dsDNA) or single-stranded (ssDNA). Most commonly, dsDNA recombineering has been used to create gene replacements, deletions, insertions, and inversions. Gene cloning and gene/protein tagging (His tags etc., see) is also common. For gene replacements or deletions, usually a cassette encoding a drug-resistance gene is made by PCR using bi-partite primers. These primers consist of (from 5’→3’) 50 bases of homology to the target region, where the cassette is to be inserted, followed by 20 bases to prime the drug resistant cassette. The exact junction sequence of the final construct is determined by primer design. These events typically occur at a frequency of approximately 10^{4}/10^{8}cells that survive electroporation. Electroporation is the method used to transform the linear substrate into the recombining cell.

=== Selection/counterselection technique ===
In some cases, one desires a deletion with no marker left behind, to make a gene fusion, or to make a point mutant in a gene. This can be done with two rounds of recombination. In the first stage of recombineering, a selection marker on a cassette is introduced to replace the region to be modified. In the second stage, a second counterselection marker (e.g. sacB) on the cassette is selected against following introduction of a target fragment containing the desired modification. Alternatively, the target fragment could be flanked by loxP or FRT sites, which could be removed later simply by the expression of the Cre or FLP recombinases, respectively. A novel selection marker "mFabI" was also developed to increase recombineering efficiency.

== Recombineering with ssDNA ==
Recombineering with ssDNA provided a breakthrough both in the efficiency of the reaction and the ease of making point mutations. This technique was further enhanced by the discovery that by avoiding the methyl-directed mismatch repair system, the frequency of obtaining recombinants can be increased to over 10^{7}/10^{8} viable cells. This frequency is high enough that alterations can now be made without selection. With optimized protocols, over 50% of the cells that survive electroporation contain the desired change. Recombineering with ssDNA only requires the Red Beta protein; Exo, Gamma and the host recombination proteins are not required. As proteins homologous to Beta and RecT are found in many bacteria and bacteriophages (>100 as of February 2010), recombineering is likely to work in many different bacteria. Thus, recombineering with ssDNA is expanding the genetic tools available for research in a variety of organisms. To date, recombineering has been performed in E. coli, S. enterica, Y. pseudotuberculosis, S. cerevisiae and M. tuberculosis.

== Red-Independent recombination ==
In the year 2010, it has been demonstrated that ssDNA recombination can occur in the absence of known recombination functions. Recombinants were found at up to 10^{4}/10^{8} viable cells. This Red-independent activity has been demonstrated in P. syringae, E. coli, S. enterica serovar typhimurium and S. flexneria.

== Applications and benefits of recombineering ==
The biggest advantage of recombineering is that it obviates the need for conveniently positioned restriction sites, whereas in conventional genetic engineering, DNA modification is often compromised by the availability of unique restriction sites. In engineering large constructs of >100 kb, such as the Bacterial Artificial Chromosomes (BACs), or chromosomes, recombineering has become a necessity. Recombineering can generate the desired modifications without leaving any 'footprints' behind. It also forgoes multiple cloning stages for generating intermediate vectors and therefore is used to modify DNA constructs in a relatively short time-frame. The homology required is short enough that it can be generated in synthetic oligonucleotides and recombination with short oligonucleotides themselves is incredibly efficient. Recently, recombineering has been developed for high throughput DNA engineering applications termed 'recombineering pipelines'. Recombineering pipelines support the large scale production of BAC transgenes and gene targeting constructs for functional genomics programs such as EUCOMM (European Conditional Mouse Mutagenesis Consortium) and KOMP (Knock-Out Mouse Program). Recombineering has also been automated, a process called "MAGE" -Multiplex Automated Genome Engineering, in the Church lab. With the development of CRISPR technologies, construction of CRISPR interference strains in E. coli requires only one-step oligo recombineering, providing a simple and easy-to-implement tool for gene expression control. "Recombineering tools" and laboratory protocols have also been implemented for a number of plant species. These tools and procedures are customizable, scalable, and freely available to all researchers.
