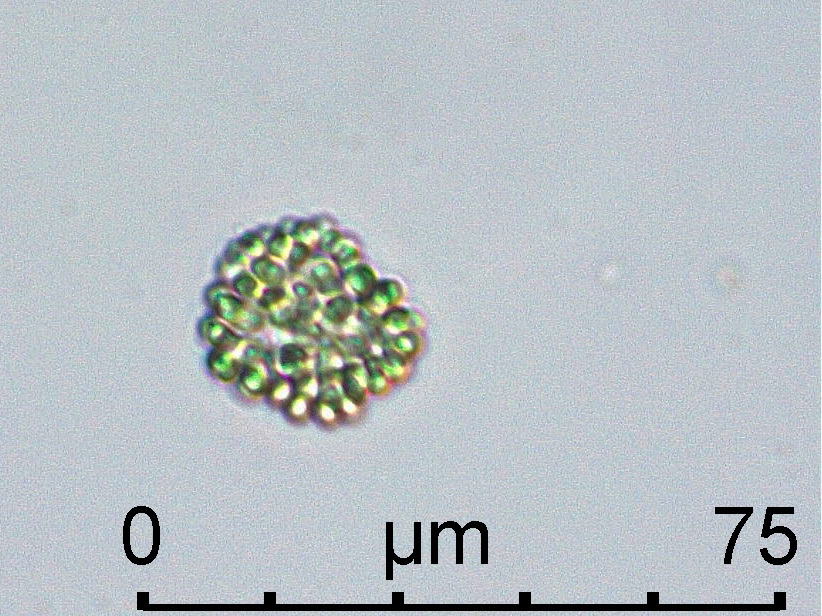
- Coelomoron pusillum

Scientific classification
- Domain: Bacteria
- Kingdom: Bacillati
- Phylum: Cyanobacteriota
- Class: Cyanophyceae
- Order: Synechococcales
- Family: Merismopediaceae
- Genus: Coelomoron; Buell, 1938

= Coelomoron =

Genus of bacteria

Coelomoron is a genus of cyanobacteria belonging to the family Merismopediaceae.

The species of this genus are found in Europe.

Species:

- Coelomoron pusillum (Goor) Komárek
- Coelomoron tropicale Senna et al.
