= Lysogeny broth =

Culture medium used in microbiology

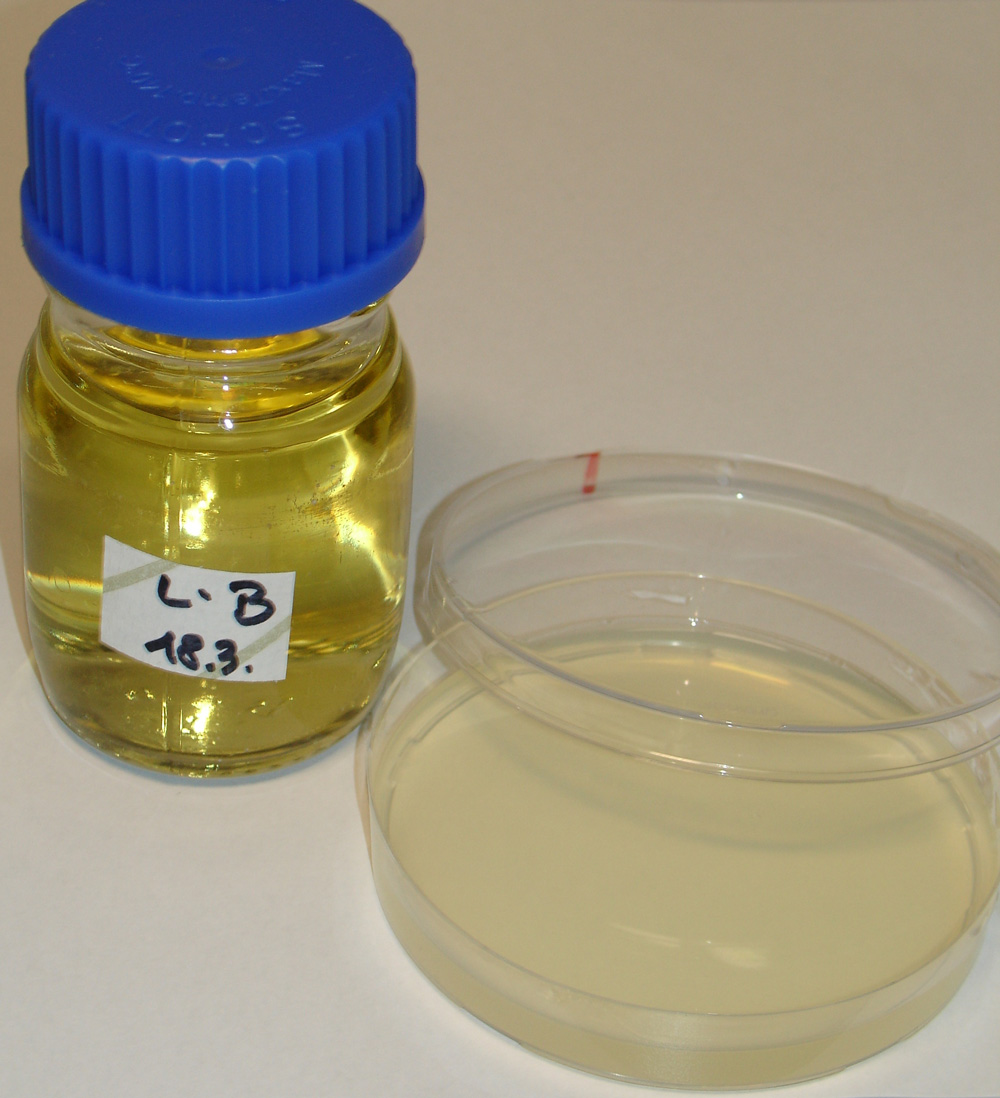
LB medium bottle and LB agar plate

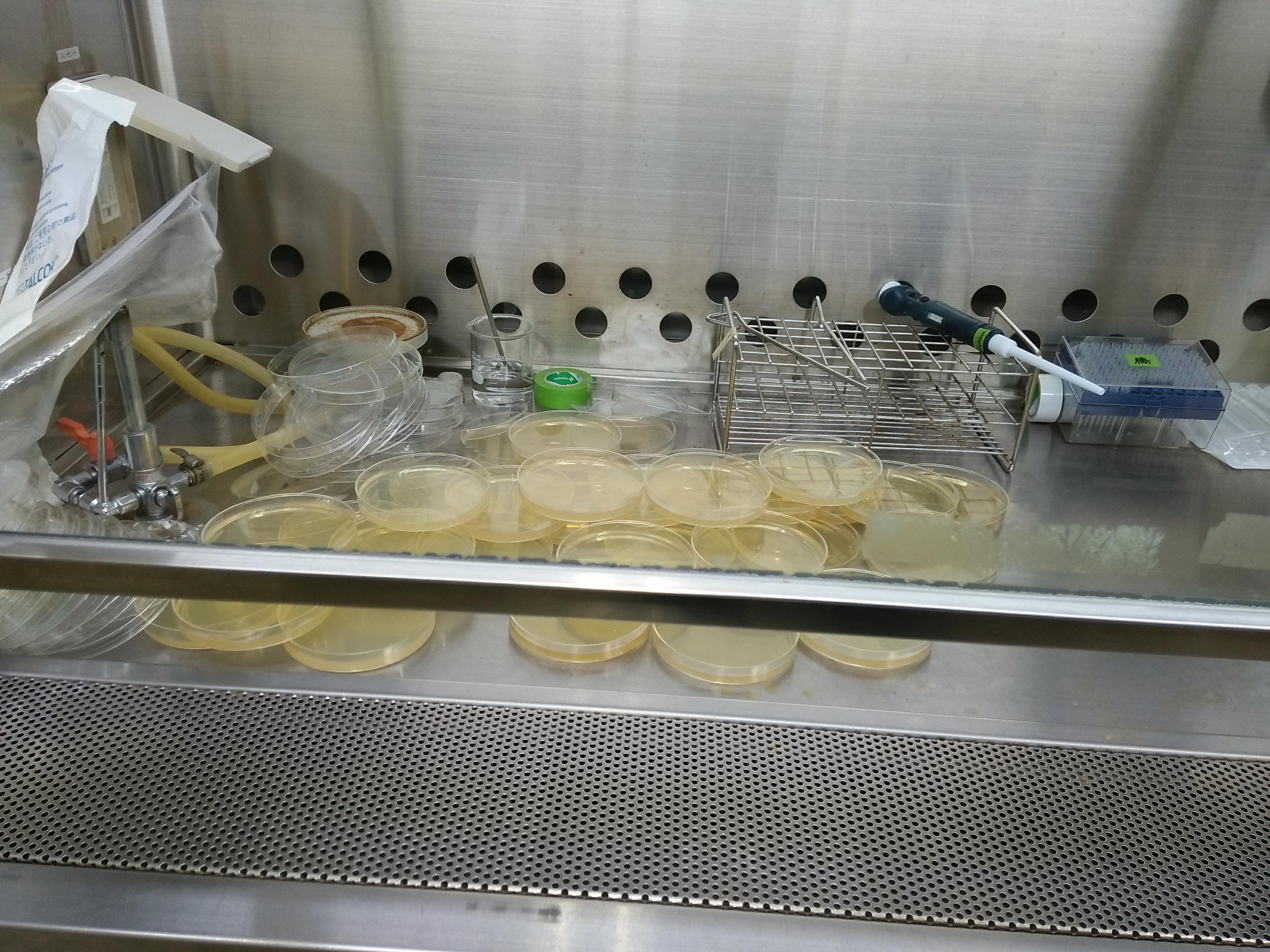
Plate medium agar LB

Lysogeny broth (LB) is a nutritionally rich medium primarily used for the growth of bacteria. Its creator, Giuseppe Bertani, intended LB to stand for lysogeny broth, but LB has also come to colloquially mean Luria broth, Lennox broth, life broth or Luria–Bertani medium. The formula of the LB medium was published in 1951 in the first paper of Bertani on lysogeny. In this article he described the modified single-burst experiment and the isolation of the phages P1, P2, and P3. He had developed the LB medium to optimize Shigella growth and plaque formation.

LB medium formulations have been an industry standard for the cultivation of Escherichia coli as far back as the 1950s. These media have been widely used in molecular microbiology applications for the preparation of plasmid DNA and recombinant proteins. It continues to be one of the most common media used for maintaining and cultivating laboratory recombinant strains of Escherichia coli. For physiological studies however, the use of LB medium is discouraged.

There are several common formulations of LB. Although they are different, they generally share a somewhat similar composition of ingredients used to promote growth, including the following:

- Peptides and casein peptones
- Vitamins (including B vitamins)
- Trace elements (e.g. nitrogen, sulfur, magnesium)
- Minerals

Sodium ions for transport and osmotic balance are provided by sodium chloride. Tryptone is used to provide essential amino acids such as peptides and peptones to the growing bacteria, while the yeast extract is used to provide a plethora of organic compounds helpful for bacterial growth. These compounds include vitamins and certain trace elements.

In his original 1951 paper, Bertani used 10 grams of NaCl and 1 gram of glucose per 1 L of solution; Luria in his "L broth" of 1957 copied Bertani's original recipe exactly. Recipes published later have typically left out the glucose.

== Formula ==
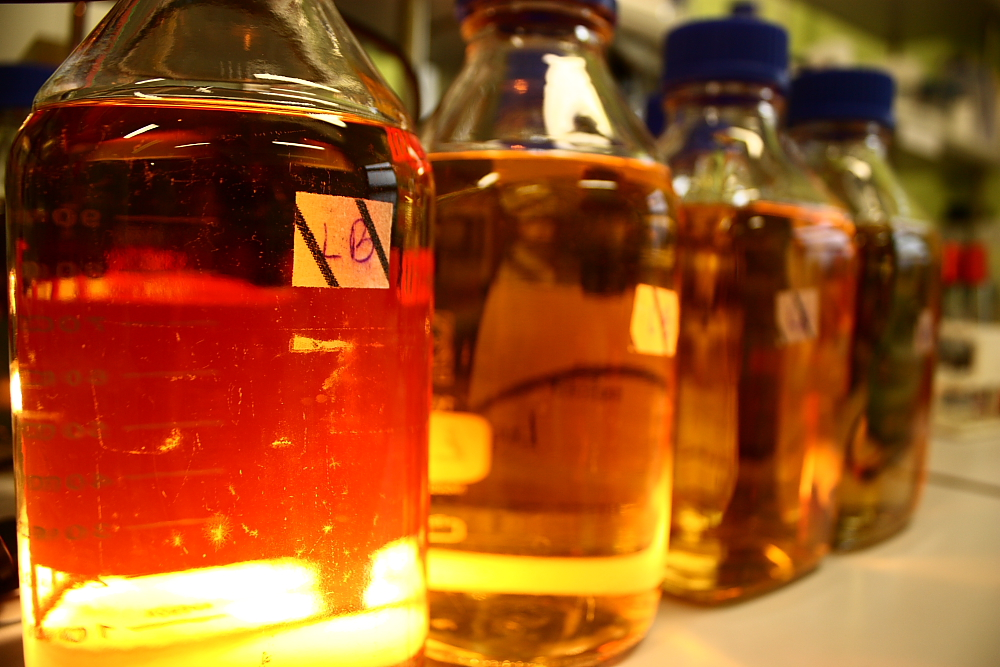
LB medium

The formulations generally differ in the amount of sodium chloride, thus providing selection of the appropriate osmotic conditions for the particular bacterial strain and desired culture conditions. The low salt formulations, Lennox and Luria, are ideal for cultures requiring salt-sensitive antibiotics.

- LB (Miller) (10 g/L NaCl)
- LB (Lennox) (5 g/L NaCl)
- LB (Luria) (0.5 g/L NaCl)

=== Adjusting the pH ===
Prior to autoclaving, some laboratories adjust the pH of LB to 7.5 or 8 with sodium hydroxide. However, sodium hydroxide does not provide any buffering capacity to the media, and this results in rapid changes to the pH during bacteria cultivation. To get around this some laboratories prefer to adjust the pH with 5–10 mmol/L TRIS buffer, diluted from 1 mol/L TRIS stock at the desired pH. However, it is not absolutely necessary to adjust the pH for most situations. Some laboratories adjust the pH to 7.0 merely as a precaution.

== See also ==
- Agar plate
- Salvador Luria
- Jeffrey H. Miller
- SOC medium – another widely used medium for culture of Escherichia coli in molecular biology work
