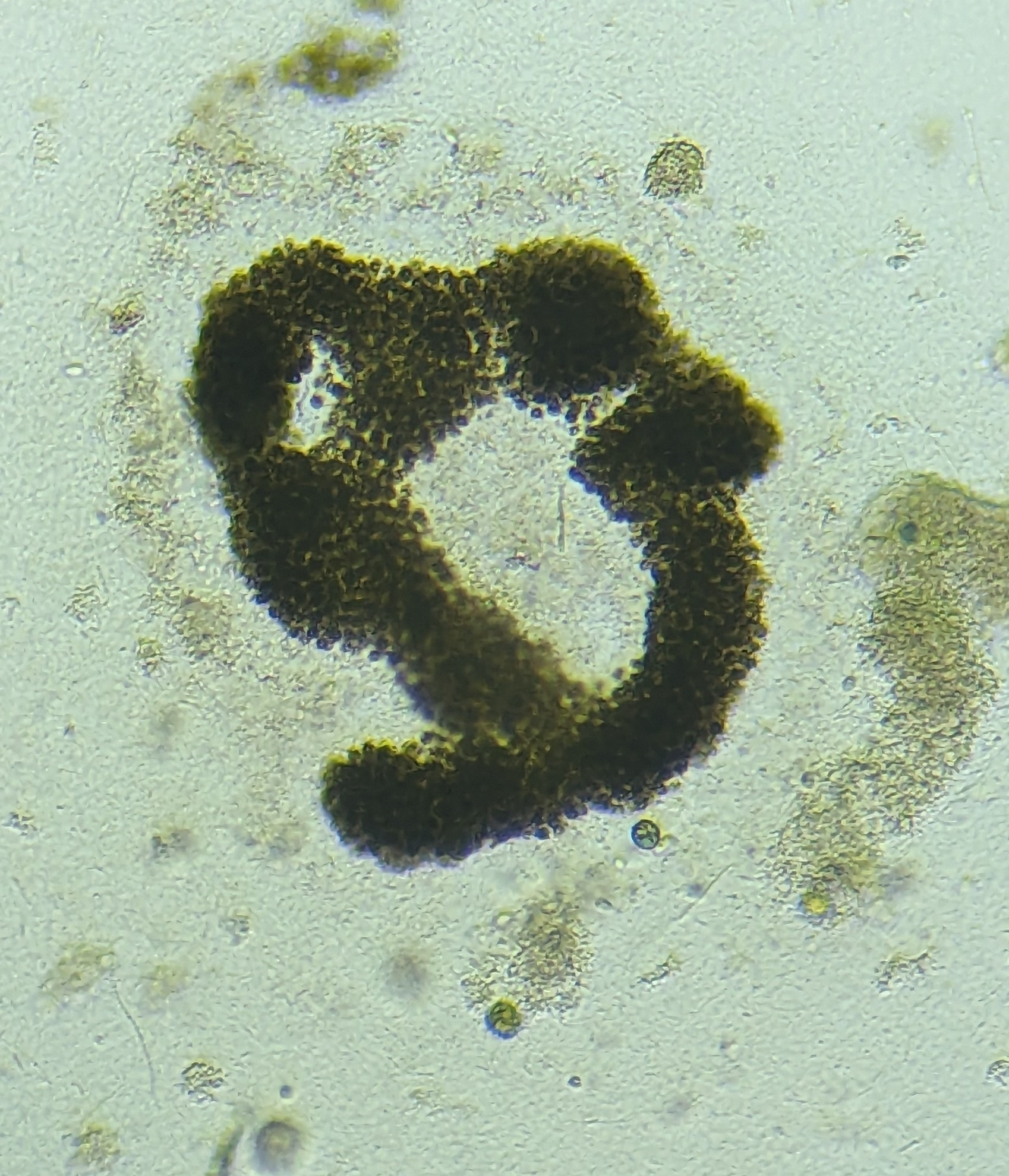

Scientific classification
- Domain: Bacteria
- Kingdom: Bacillati
- Phylum: Cyanobacteriota
- Class: Cyanophyceae
- Order: Chroococcales
- Family: Microcystaceae
- Genus: Microcystis
- Species: M. aeruginosa

Binomial name
- Microcystis aeruginosa Kützing, 1846

= Microcystis aeruginosa =

Species of bacterium

Microcystis aeruginosa is a species of freshwater cyanobacteria that can form harmful algal blooms of economic and ecological importance. They are the most common toxic cyanobacterial bloom in eutrophic fresh water. Cyanobacteria produce neurotoxins and peptide hepatotoxins, such as microcystin and cyanopeptolin. Microcystis aeruginosa produces numerous congeners of microcystin, with microcystin-LR being the most common. Microcystis blooms have been reported in at least 108 countries, with the production of microcystin noted in at least 79.

== Characteristics ==
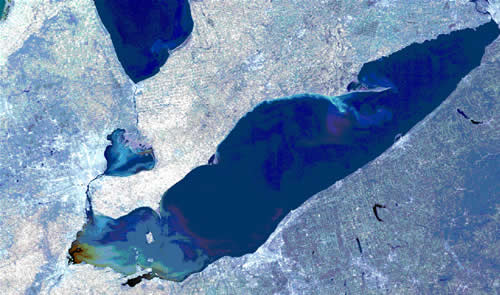
NOAA MERIS image of large cyanobacterial bloom confirmed as M. aeruginosa

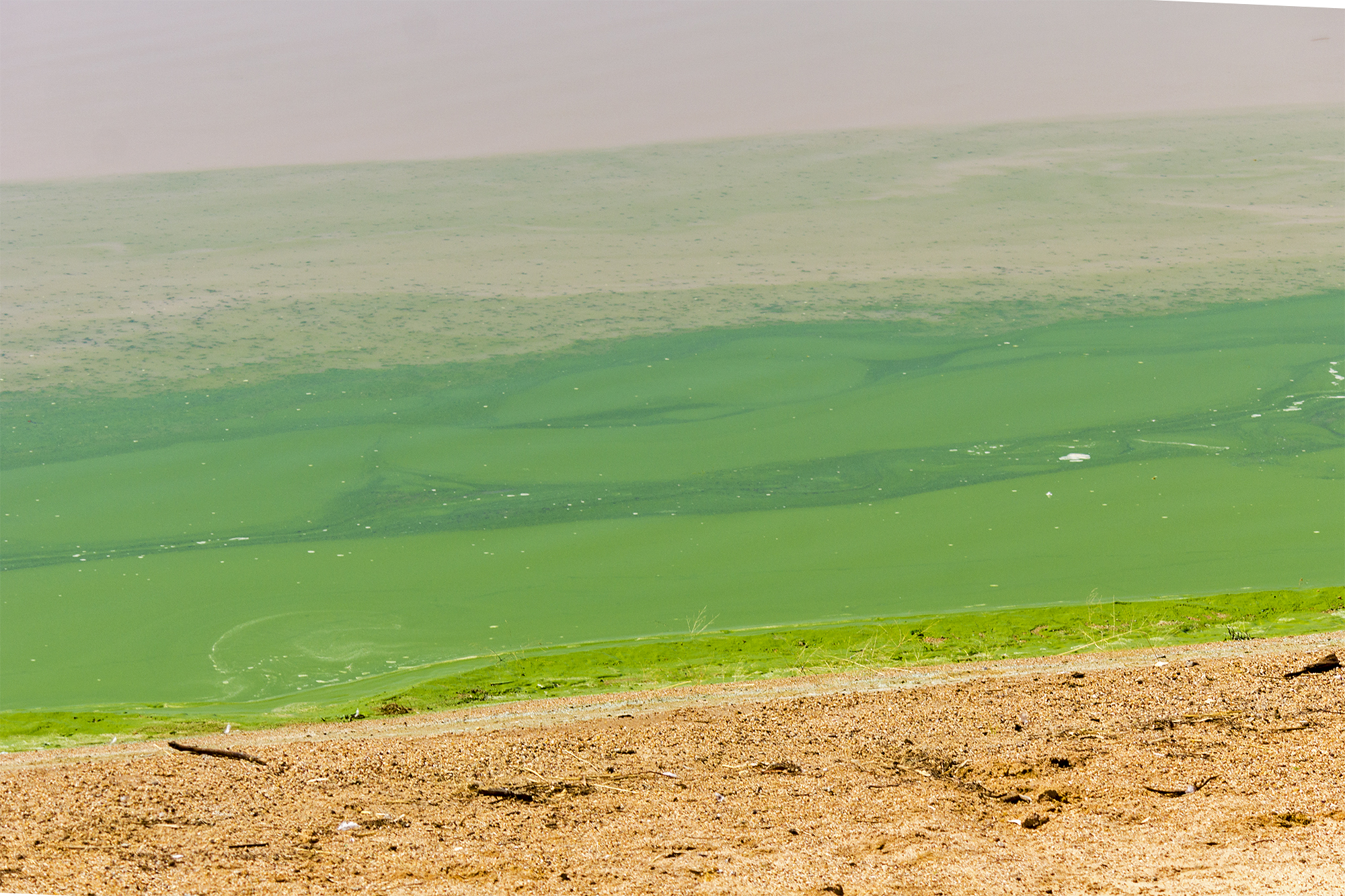
Microcystis aeruginosa bloom in Lake Albert in Wagga Wagga, Australia

As the etymological derivation implies, Microcystis is characterized by small cells (of only a few micrometers diameter), which lack individual sheaths.

Cells usually are organized into colonies (large colonies of which may be viewed with the naked eye) that begin in a spherical shape, but lose their coherence to become perforated or irregularly shaped over time in culture. Recent evidence suggests one of the drivers of colony formation is disturbance / water column mixing.

The protoplast is a light blue-green color, appearing dark or brown due to optical effects of gas-filled vesicles; this can be useful as a distinguishing characteristic when using light microscopy. These vesicles provide the buoyancy necessary for M. aeruginosa to stay at a level within the water column at which they can obtain optimum light and carbon dioxide levels for rapid growth.

== Ecology ==
M. aeruginosa is favored by warm temperatures, but toxicity and maximal growth rates are not totally coupled, as the cyanobacterium has highest laboratory growth rates at 32 °C, while toxicity is highest at 20 °C, lowering in toxicity as a function of increasing temperatures in excess of 28 °C. Growth has been found to be limited below 15 °C.

The aquatic plant Myriophyllum spicatum produces ellagic, gallic, and pyrogallic acids and (+)-catechin, allelopathic polyphenols inhibiting the growth of M. aeruginosa.

== Toxins ==
M. aeruginosa can produce both neurotoxins (lipopolysaccharides-LPSs) and hepatotoxins (microcystins).

== Economic importance ==
Because of M. aeruginosa´s microcystin toxin production under the right environmental conditions, it can be a source of drinking water pollution. Water quality mitigation measures in the form of water filtration facilities can lead to increased economic costs, as well as damage to local tourism caused by lake or other waterway closures. In recent years major incidents have occurred in both China and the United States / Canada

M. aeruginosa is the subject of research into the natural production of butylated hydroxytoluene (BHT), an antioxidant, food additive, and industrial chemical.

Bio-active peptides called aerucyclamides can be isolated from M. aeruginosa.

== Ecological importance ==
In 2009, unprecedented mammal mortality in the southern part of the Kruger National Park led to an investigation which implicated M. aeruginosa. The dead animals included grazers and browsers, which preferred drinking from the leeward side of two dams, a natural point of accumulation for drifting Microcystis blooms. Mammals such as elephants and buffalo that usually wade into water before drinking, were unaffected, as were the resident crocodiles. The source of nutrients that supported the Microcystis growth was narrowed down to the dung and urine voided in the water by a large resident hippo population, unaffected by the bloom. The immediate problem was solved by breaching of the dam walls and draining of the water. M. aeruginosa is the most abundant cyanobacterial genus in South Africa, with both toxic and harmless strains. Some South African water bodies are now highly contaminated, mostly from return flows out of dysfunctional wastewater treatment works that discharge over 4 billion litres (1.1 billion US gallons) of untreated, or at best partially treated sewage into receiving rivers every day, with Hartebeestpoort Dam being among the worst.

Microcystin has been linked to the death of sea otters in 2010, a threatened species in the US. The poisoning probably resulted from eating contaminated bivalves often consumed by sea otters and humans. Such bivalves in the area exhibited significant biomagnification (to 107 times ambient water levels) of microcystin.

=== Glyphosate metabolism ===
Algal blooms of cyanobacteria thrive in the large phosphorus content of agricultural runoff. Besides consuming phosphorus, M. aeruginosa thrives on glyphosate, although high concentrations may inhibit it. M. aeruginosa has shown glyphosate resistance as result of preselective mutations, and glyphosate presence serves as an advantage to this and other microbes that are able to tolerate its effects, while killing those less tolerant. In contrast research in Lake Erie has suggested that glyphosate may lead to blooms of another cyanobacterium - Planktothrix - in place of Microcystis.
