= Super optimal broth =

Culture medium used in microbiology

Super optimal broth (SOB medium) is a nutrient-rich bacterial growth medium used for microbiological culture, generally of Escherichia coli. This nutrient-rich microbial broth contains peptides, amino acids, water soluble vitamins and glucose in a low-salt formulation. It was developed by Douglas Hanahan in 1983 and is an adjusted version of the commonly used LB medium (lysogeny broth). Growth of E. coli in SOB or SOC medium results in higher transformation efficiencies of plasmids. SOC medium can also be used to regenerate Klebsiella oxytoca strains for the improved transformation efficiency.

Super optimal broth with catabolite repression (SOC) is SOB with glucose added to the culture medium as preferred carbon and energy source (i.e., rapidly metabolizable).

== Composition ==
Figures in parentheses are the masses of reagents required to prepare 1 liter of medium.

=== SOB ===
- 2 % w/v tryptone (tryptic peptides from the casein hydrolysis by trypsin) (20 g)
- 0.5 % w/v yeast extract (5 g)
- 8.56 mM NaCl (0.5 g) or 10 mM NaCl (0.584 g)
- 2.5 mM KCl (0.186 g)
- Doubly distilled H_{2}O to 1000 mL
- 10 mM MgCl_{2} (anhydrous: 0.952 g; hexahydrate: 2.033 g) and 10 mM MgSO_{4} (anhydrous:1.204 g; heptahydrate: 2.465 g)

=== SOC ===
In addition to the SOB contents, SOC also contains 20 mM glucose (3.603 g).

SOC can be prepared by adding glucose to pre-prepared SOB.

== pH adjustment ==
For maximum effectiveness, SOB/SOC media should have its pH adjusted to 7.0 by adding concentrated sodium hydroxide. The original literature states that the pH of the final medium should be between 6.8 and 7.0.

== Sterilization ==
Finally, the SOB medium should be autoclaved at 121 °C to ensure sterility. The components of SOC medium should not be autoclaved together because at elevated temperature glucose can react with the tryptic peptides (see Maillard reaction), compromising the quality of the preparation. SOB and magnesium and glucose additive solutions can be autoclaved separately and mixed afterwards to the final concentrations. Complete SOC can be filter sterilized through a 0.22 μm filter.
