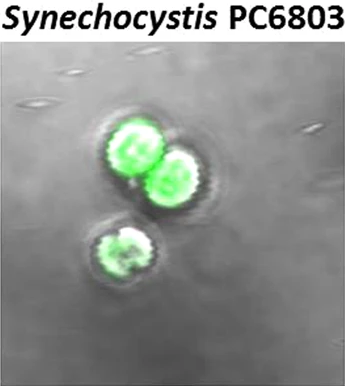

Scientific classification
- Domain: Bacteria
- Kingdom: Bacillati
- Phylum: Cyanobacteriota
- Class: Cyanophyceae
- Order: Synechococcales
- Family: Merismopediaceae
- Genus: Synechocystis; Sauvageau, 1892

= Synechocystis =

Genus of bacteria

Synechocystis is a genus of unicellular, freshwater cyanobacteria in the family Merismopediaceae. It includes a strain, Synechocystis sp. PCC 6803, which is a well studied model organism.

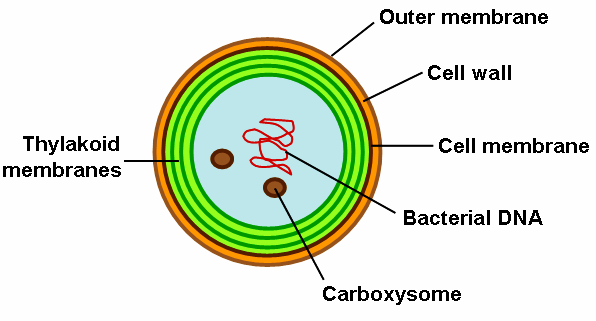
Synechocystis

Like all cyanobacteria, Synechocystis branches on the evolutionary tree from its ancestral root, Gloeobacter violaceus. Synechocystis is not diazotrophic, and is closely related to another model organism, Cyanothece ATCC 51442. It has been suggested that originally Synechocystis possessed the ability to fix atmospheric nitrogen, but lost the genes required for the process. Synechocystis can detect light and move in the direction of light.

== See also ==
- Synechocystis run-and-tumble
