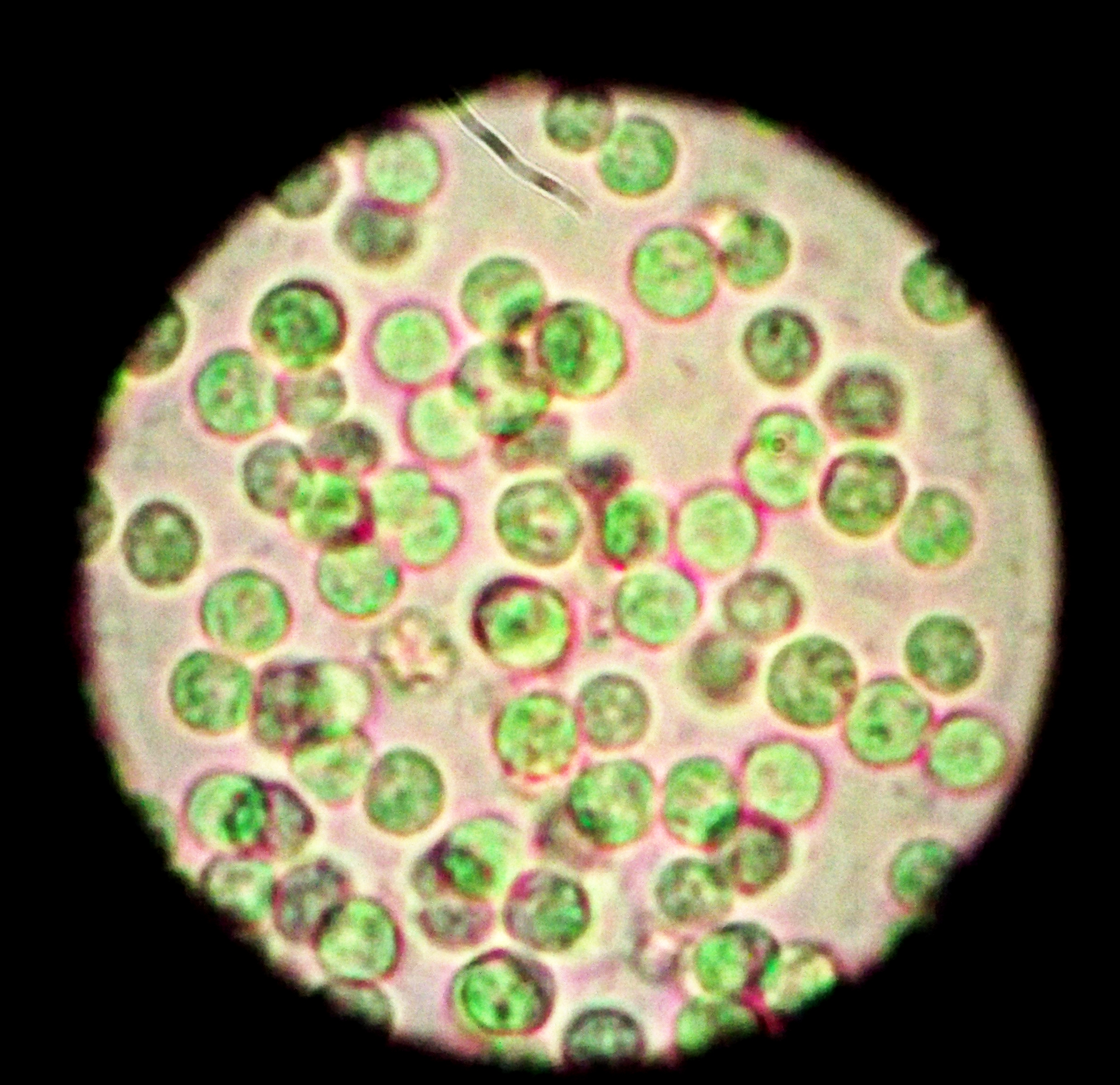
- Aphanocapsa sp.

Scientific classification
- Domain: Bacteria
- Kingdom: Bacillati
- Phylum: Cyanobacteriota
- Class: Cyanophyceae
- Order: Synechococcales
- Family: Merismopediaceae
- Genus: Aphanocapsa; Nägeli

= Aphanocapsa =

Genus of bacteria

Aphanocapsa is a genus of cyanobacteria belonging to the family Merismopediaceae.

The species of this genus are found in Europe, Asia (Bangladesh) and America.

Species:

- Aphanocapsa elachista West & G.S.West, 1894
- Aphanocapsa feldmannii Frémy, 1933
