= Eucapsis =

Scientific classification
- Domain: Bacteria
- Kingdom: Bacillati
- Phylum: Cyanobacteriota
- Class: Cyanophyceae
- Order: Synechococcales
- Family: Merismopediaceae
- Genus: Eucapsis; Clements and Shantz 1909

Genus of cyanobacteria

Eucapsis is a genus of cyanobacteria belonging to the family Merismopediaceae.

The genus was first described by Clements and Shantz in 1909.

The genus has cosmopolitan distribution.

Species:

- Eucapsis alpina Clements & Schantz, 1909
- Eucapsis carpatica J. Komárek & F. Hindák, 1988
- Eucapsis densa M.T.P. Azevedo et al.
- Eucapsis himalayensis M. Watanabe & Komárek, 1994
- Eucapsis minor (Skuja) Elenkin, 1933
- Eucapsis minuta F.E. Fritsch, 1912
- Eucapsis parallelepipedon (Schmidle) J. Komárek & F. Hindák, 1989
- Eucapsis salina González-Guerrero, 1948
- Eucapsis salina P. González, 1947
- Eucapsis starmachii J. Komárek & F. Hindák, 1989
- Eucapsis terrestris Akiyama, 1965
