= Siphonosphaera =

Scientific classification
- Domain: Eukaryota
- Clade: Sar
- Clade: Rhizaria
- Phylum: Retaria
- Class: Polycystinea
- Order: Nassellaria
- Family: Collozoidae
- Subfamily: Collosphaeridae
- Genus: Siphonosphaera; Muller 1858

Species
- 5; see text

Genus of single-celled organisms

Siphonosphaera is a genus of radiolarians. The genus contains bioluminescent species. It is a genus of colonial radiolarians (as opposed to solitary).

== Species ==
The following species are recognized:

- Siphonosphaera hippotis
- Siphonosphaera magnisphaera Takahashi, 1991
- Siphonosphaera martensi Brandt, 1905
- Siphonosphaera polysiphonia Haeckel, 1887
- Siphonosphaera socialis Haeckel, 1887
