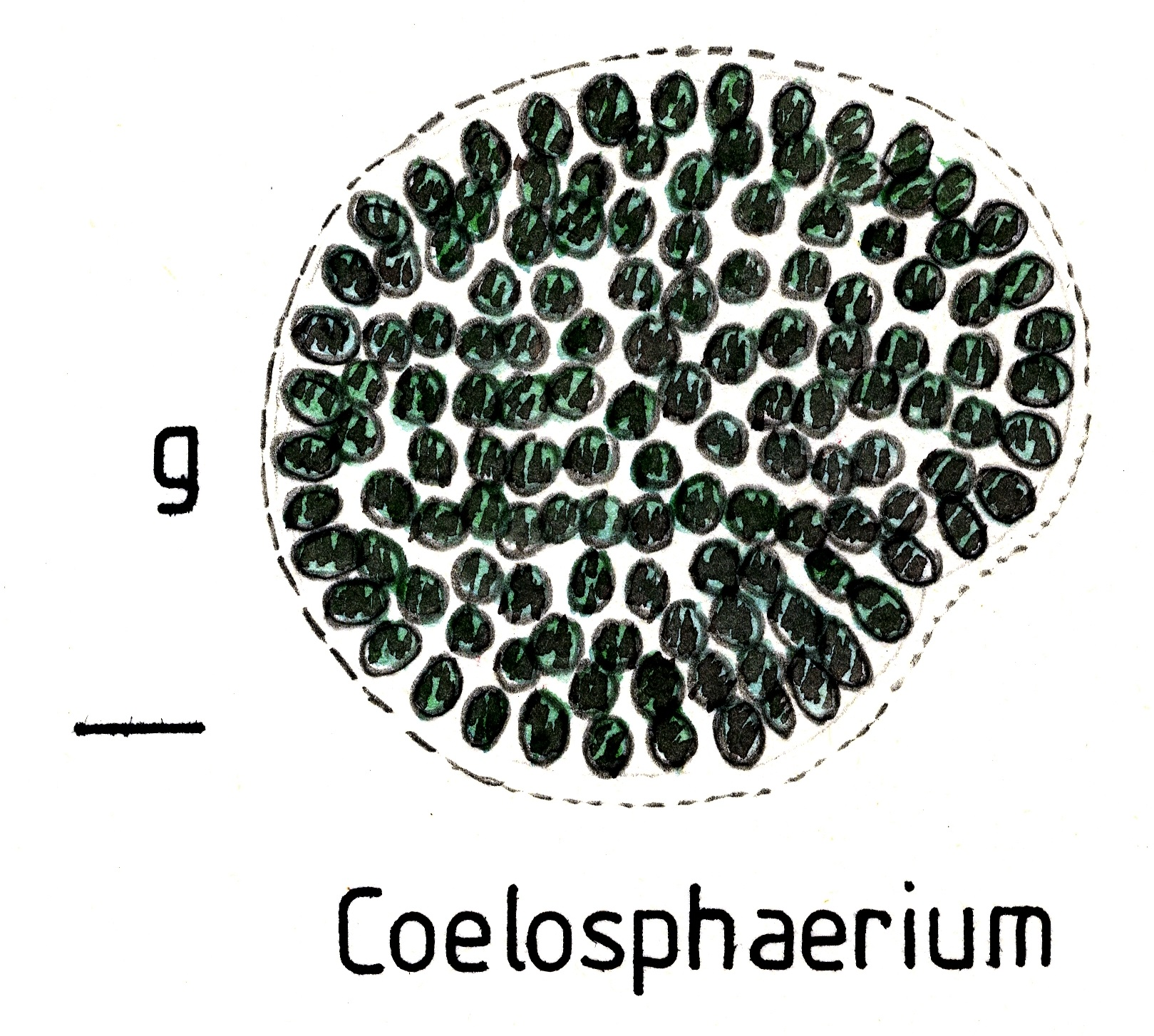
- Colony of Coelosphaerium, g — gas vacuolate Scale bar ~10 µm

Scientific classification
- Domain: Bacteria
- Phylum: Cyanobacteria
- Class: Cyanophyceae
- Order: Synechococcales
- Family: Merismopediaceae
- Genus: Coelosphaerium; Nägeli, 1849

= Coelosphaerium =

Genus of bacteria

Coelosphaerium is a genus of cyanobacteria belonging to the family Merismopediaceae.

The species of this genus are found in Europe, America and Australia.

Species:

- Coelosphaerium aerugineum Lemmerm.
- Coelosphaerium confertum West & G.S.West
- Coelosphaerium dubium Grunow
- Coelosphaerium evidenter-marginatum M.T.P.Azevedo & Sant'Anna
- Coelosphaerium goetzei Schmdle
- Coelosphaerium kuetzingianum Nägeli
- Coelosphaerium limnicolum Lund
- Coelosphaerium minutissimum Lemmerm.
- Coelosphaerium subarcticum Komárek & Komárk.-Legn.
