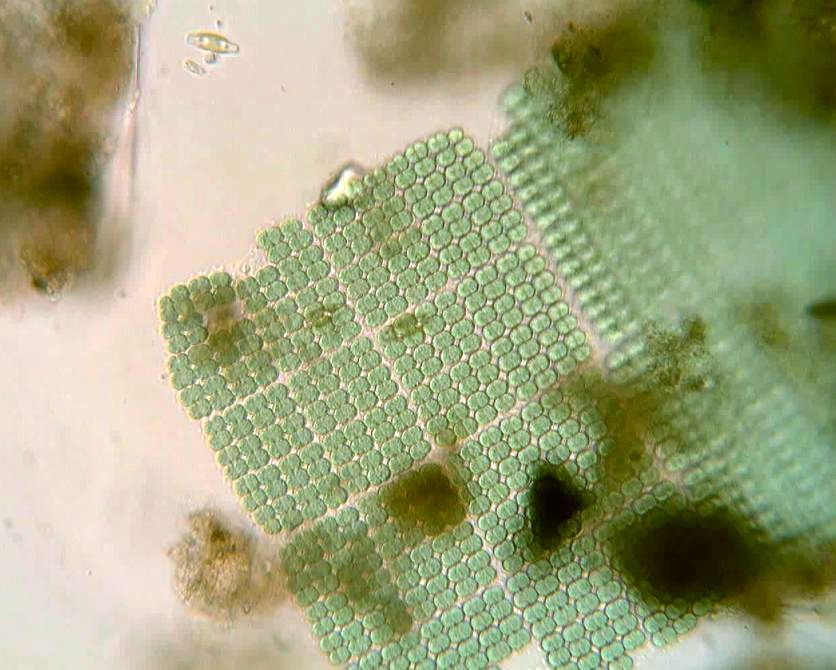
- Merismopedia sp.

Scientific classification
- Domain: Bacteria
- Phylum: Cyanobacteria
- Class: Cyanophyceae
- Order: Synechococcales
- Family: Merismopediaceae
- Genus: Merismopedia; Meyen, 1839

Species
- M. affixa; M. angularis; M. artica; M. cantonensis; M. chondroidea; M. convoluta; M. danubiana; M. duplex; M. elegans; M. ferrophila; M. glauca; M. insignis; M. litoralis; M. marssonii; M. minima; M. paludosa; M. punctata; M. quadruplicata; M. remota; M. revoluta; M. revolutivum; M. sinica; M. smithii; M. tenuissima; M. thermalis; M. trolleri; M. venezuelica; M. warmingiana

= Merismopedia =

Genus of bacteria

Merismopedia (from the Greek merismos [division] and the Greek pedion [plain]) is a genus of cyanobacteria found in fresh and salt water. It is ovoid or spherical in shape and arranged in rows and flats, forming rectangular colonies held together by a mucilaginous matrix. Species in this genus divide in only two directions, creating a characteristic grid-like pattern.
