= PBAD promoter =

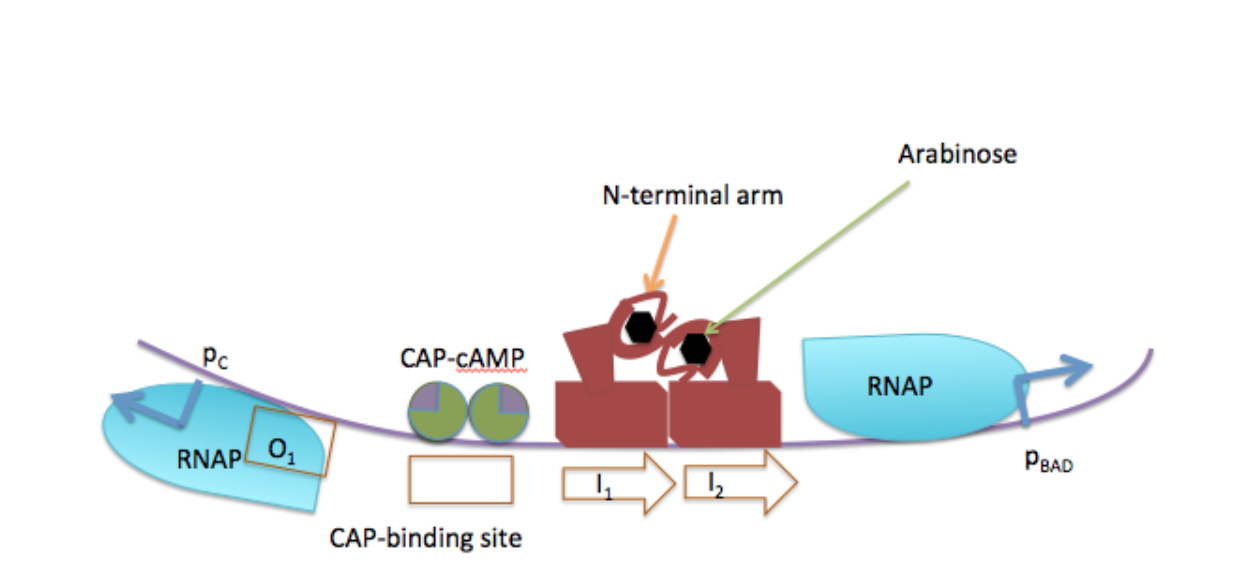
Figure 1. Expression of araB, araA and araC in the presence of arabinose. In the presence of L-arabinose, arabinose binds to the arabinose binding pocket sites of AraC, causing AraC to dimerize at the I_{1} and I_{2} operators. This allows access for CAP to bind to the CAP-binding sites, which in turn helps recruit RNA Polymerase to both P_{BAD} and P_{C} promoters and activates transcription.

P_{BAD} (systematically araBp) is a promoter found in bacteria and especially as part of plasmids used in laboratory studies. The promoter is a part of the arabinose operon whose name derives from the genes it regulates transcription of: araB, araA, and araD. In E. coli, the P_{BAD} promoter is adjacent to the P_{C} promoter (systematically araCp), which transcribes the araC gene in the opposite direction. araC encodes the AraC protein, which regulates activity of both the P_{BAD} and P_{C} promoters. The cyclic AMP receptor protein CAP binds between the P_{BAD} and P_{C} promoters, stimulating transcription of both when bound by cAMP.

== Regulation of P_{BAD} ==
Transcription initiation at the P_{BAD} promoter occurs in the presence of high L-arabinose and low glucose concentrations. Upon arabinose binding to AraC, the N-terminal arm of AraC is released from its DNA binding domain via a “light switch” mechanism. This allows AraC to dimerize and bind the I_{1} and I_{2} operators. The AraC-arabinose dimer at this site contributes to activation of the P_{BAD}promoter. Additionally, CAP binds to two CAP binding sites upstream of the I_{1} and I_{2} operators and helps activate the P_{BAD} promoter. In the presence of both high arabinose and high glucose concentrations however, low cAMP levels prevent CAP from activating the P_{BAD} promoter. It is hypothesized that P_{BAD} promoter activation by CAP and AraC is mediated through contacts between the C-terminal domain of the α-subunit of RNA polymerase and the CAP and AraC proteins.

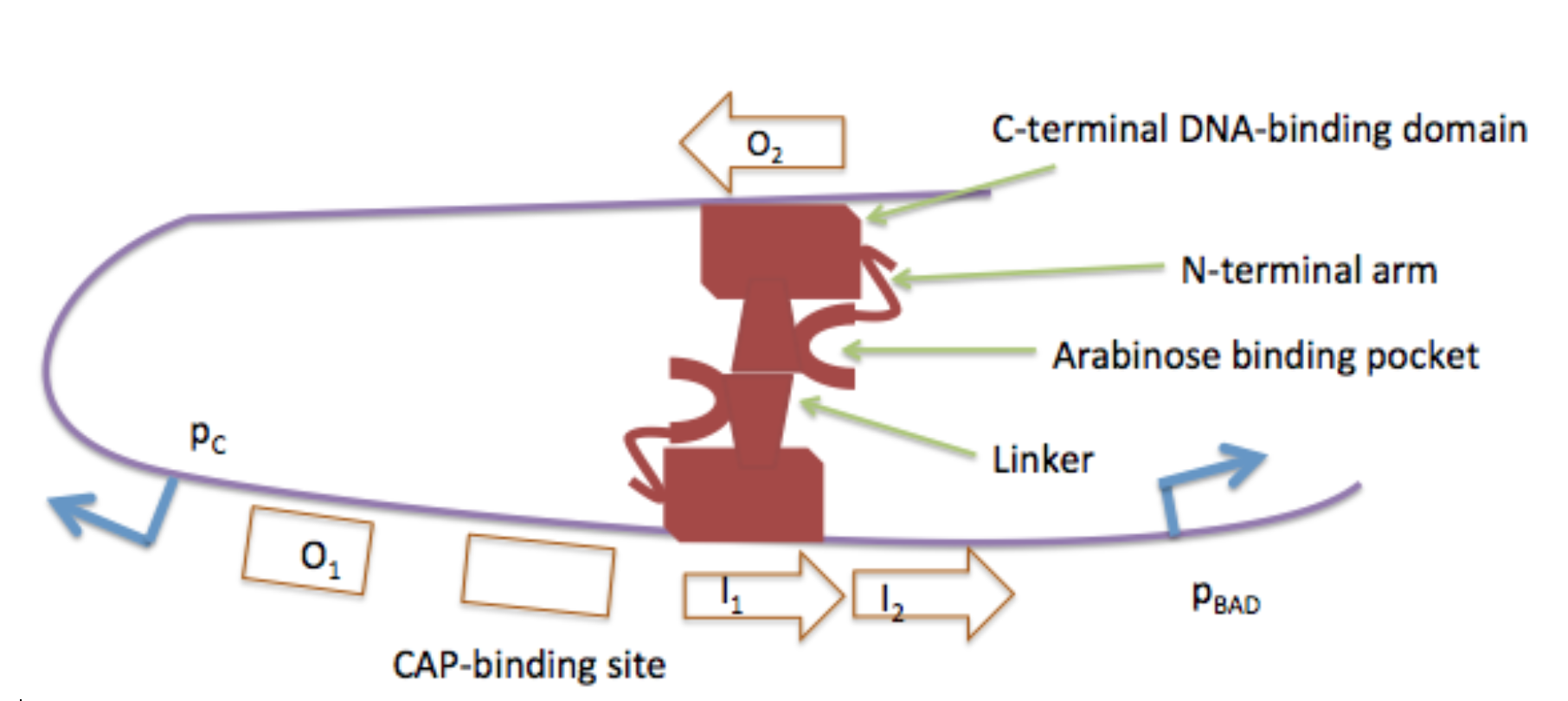
Figure 2. Expression of araB, araA and araC does not occur when arabinose is not present. In the absence of arabinose, AraC dimerizes while bound to the O_{2} and I_{1} operator sites, looping the DNA. The looping prevents binding of CAP and RNA Polymerase, which normally activate the transcription of both P_{BAD} and P_{C}.

Without arabinose, and regardless of glucose concentration, the P_{BAD} and P_{C}promoters are repressed by AraC. The N-terminal arm of AraC interacts with its DNA binding domain, allowing two AraC proteins to bind to the O_{2} and I_{1} operator sites. The O_{2}operator is situated within the araC gene. An AraC dimer also binds to the O_{1} operator and represses the P_{C} promoter via a negative autoregulatory feedback loop. The two bound AraC proteins dimerize and cause looping of the DNA. The looping prevents binding of CAP and RNA Polymerase, which normally activate the transcription of both P_{BAD} and P_{C}.

Transcription by P_{BAD}	High Arabinose	Low Arabinose
High Glucose	Repressed	Repressed
Low Glucose	Active	Repressed

The spacing between the O_{2} and I_{1} operator sites is critical. Adding or removing 5 base pairs between the O_{2} and I_{1} operator sites abrogates AraC mediated repression of the P_{BAD} promoter. The spacing requirement arises from the double helix nature of DNA, in which a complete turn of the helix is about 10.5 nucleotides. Therefore, adding or removing 5 base pairs between the O_{2} and I_{1} operator sites rotates the helix roughly 180 degrees. This reverses the direction that the O_{2}operator faces when the DNA is looped and prevents dimerization of the O_{2} bound AraC with the bound I_{1} araC.

== The P_{BAD} promoter on expression plasmids ==
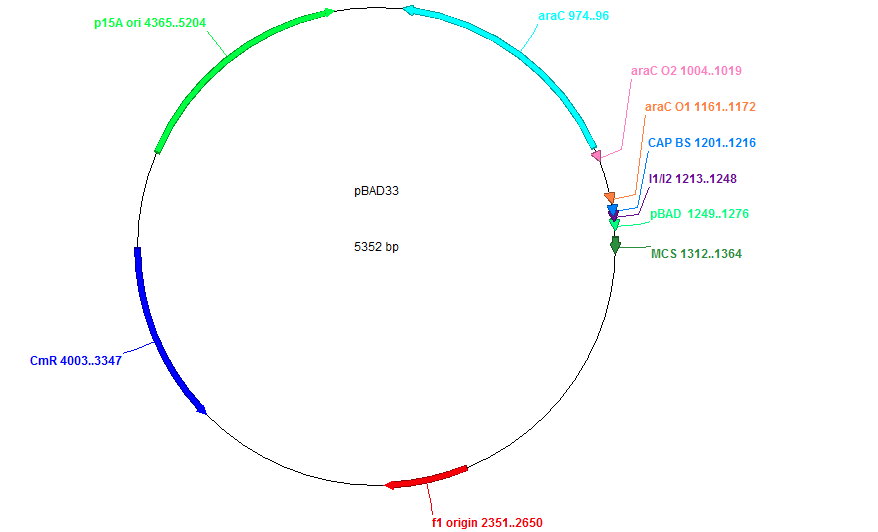
Figure 3. A representation of the PBAD 33 promoter on a plasmid with common cis-acting regions. Abbreviations are defined as the phagemid origin (f1 origin), chloramphenicol resistance (CmR), plasmid origin (p15A ori), araC gene (araC), araC operator sites (araC O2 and O1), CAP-binding site (CAP BS), araC inducer sites (I1/I2), PBAD promoter (pBAD) and the multiple cloning site (MCS).

The P_{BAD} promoter allows for tight regulation and control of a target gene in vivo. As explained above, P_{BAD} is regulated by the addition and absence of arabinose. As tested, the promoter can be further repressed with reduced levels of cAMP through the addition of glucose. Plasmid vectors have been constructed and tested with a selectable marker (Cm^{R} in this case), origin of replication, araC and operons, multiple cloning site and P_{BAD} promoter. Studies show that vectors are highly expressed and can be used, in combination with chromosomal null alleles, to study loss of function of essential genes.
