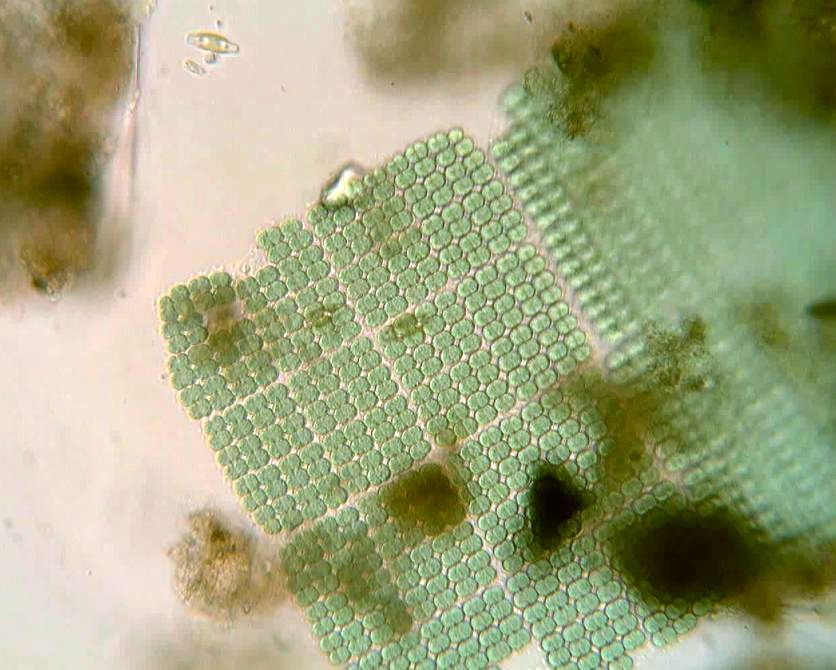
- Merismopediaceae

Scientific classification
- Domain: Bacteria
- Phylum: Cyanobacteria
- Class: Cyanophyceae
- Order: Synechococcales
- Family: Merismopediaceae; Elenkin

Genera
- Aphanocapsa Nägeli 1849; Coccopedia Troickaja 1922; Cyanotetras Hindák 1988; Eucapsis Clements & Shantz 1909; Limnococcus Komárková et al. 2010; Mantellum Dangeard 1941; Merismopedia Meyen 1839; Microcrocis Richter 1882; Pannus Hickel 1991; Synechocystis Sauvageau 1892

= Merismopediaceae =

Family of bacteria

The Merismopediaceae are a family of cyanobacteria.
