= Hydrogenase (disambiguation) =

Hydrogenase is an enzyme that catalyses the reversible oxidation of molecular hydrogen (H_{2}).

Hydrogenase may also refer to:

- Hydrogenase (NAD+, ferredoxin)
- Hydrogenase (acceptor)
- Hydrogenase maturation protease family
- Hydrogenase mimic
