= Bidirectional hydrogenase =

Bidirectional hydrogenase may refer to:

- Ferredoxin hydrogenase, an enzyme
- Hydrogen dehydrogenase, an enzyme
