= Hydrogenlyase =

Hydrogenlyase may refer to:

- Ferredoxin hydrogenase, an enzyme
- Hydrogenase (acceptor), an enzyme
