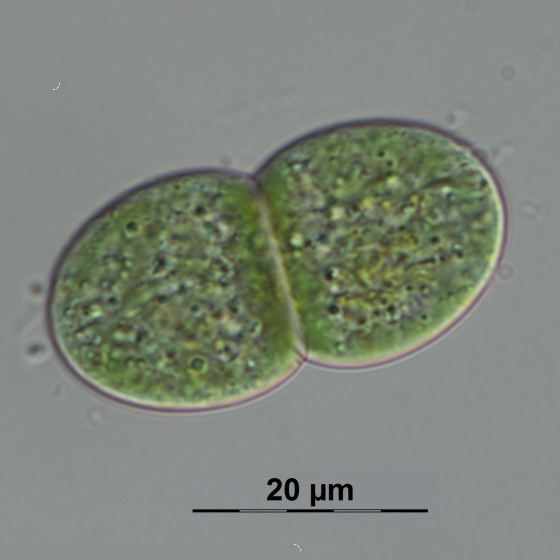
- Cyanothece aeruginosa

Scientific classification
- Domain: Bacteria
- Kingdom: Bacillati
- Phylum: Cyanobacteriota
- Class: Cyanophyceae
- Order: Oscillatoriales
- Family: Cyanothecaceae; Komárek et al. 2014
- Genus: Cyanothece; Komárek 1976

= Cyanothece =

Genus of bacteria

Cyanothece is a genus of unicellular, diazotrophic, oxygenic photosynthesizing cyanobacteria.

== Modern organisms and cellular organization ==
In 1976, Jiří Komárek defined the prokaryotic cyanobacteria genus Cyanothece as distinct from Synechococcus NAG 1949. Organisms in both genera share characteristics in addition to being oxygenic phototrophs. They are both unicellular, forming aggregates, but not found in mucilaginous colonies. They may have a thin mucilage layer around each cell. Both genera also divide by binary fission along an axis perpendicular to the cell's longitudinal axis.

A handful of characteristics distinguish the two genera. While Synechococcus species are usually cylindrical, Cyanothece species are normally oval and longer than 3 μm., Cyanothece’s outer cell wall layer is relatively thick and contains spherical, glassy vesicles whose function has yet to be defined. Cyanothece’s nucleoids are spread loosely throughout the cell, with a net-like appearance. Instead of concentric thylakoid membranes that share a center or axis, Cyanothece’s exhibit short, wavy and radially arranged., All Cyanothece had nitrogenase activity at one time; although some strains have lost the necessary genes. During nitrogen-fixing conditions, Cyanothece creates inclusion storage bodies under the control of a circadian rhythm.

== Evolutionary history ==
Between 2.5 and 3.0 billion years ago, cyanobacteria started using the energy from light to split water, releasing oxygen into the anaerobic, reducing environment. Parts of this ancient cyanobacterial metabolism are still maintained today. Bandyopadhyay et al. 2011 created a phylogenic tree for cyanobacteria using 226 homolog protein groups. They grouped five of the six major Cyanothece strains (PCC 7424, PCC 7822, ATCC 51142, PCC 8801, PCC 8802) as belonging to a single clade, but had Cyanothece sp PCC 7425 branched off earlier. PCC 7425's nitrogenase cluster is arranged differently from the other five strains and can only fix nitrogen anaerobically. Most other cyanobacteria may have lost their ability to fix nitrogen. As Earth's climate became more oxidated, the process of fixing nitrogen became unfavorable, and natural selection eliminated some of the necessary genes for the nitrogenase protein complex to increase evolutionary fitness.

== Photosynthesis/pigments ==
Cyanobacteria turn energy from the sun into chemical energy through oxygenic photosynthesis. Their light-harvesting complex that captures the photons usually includes the pigments chlorophyll a and phycocyanin. A cyanobacterium's typical blue-green color is a result of the combination of these two pigments. Three Cyanothece strains, sp. PCC 7424, 7822 and 8801, have the additional pigment phycoerythrin, which expands the wavelengths of light these species use for energy. Phycoerythrin also gives these three species a brownish-green color.

The rate of oxygen created by photosystem II is much higher when Cyanothece does not fix nitrogen (when the medium is nitrogen-replete). The genera's circadian rhythm controls photosynthetic oxygen generation by regulating when the proteins for their photosynthetic machinery are produced. This diurnal oscillation occurs even when the organisms are kept in the light continuously or in the dark continuously. Photosynthesis is downregulated when the nitrogen-fixing enzyme, nitrogenase, is upregulated. Decreasing the oxygen in the cell allows the oxygen-sensitive nitrogenase to fix nitrogen from the air for the organism's needs.

== Metabolism, biosynthesis, symbiosis ==
Cyanothece balances the production of oxygen through photosynthesis and oxygen-sensitive nitrogen fixation and fermentation all in one cell. They accomplish this by separating the two processes in time under the control of their circadian rhythm. During the day, they use the energy harnessed from photosynthesis to produce the carbohydrate glycogen, which is stored in granules. At night, the organisms break down the glycogen, providing the energy for nitrogen fixation. In a very energy-intensive process, nitrogenase is first synthesized and then takes N_{2} from the air, combining it with protons and electrons to produce ammonia and hydrogen gas. The organisms also store cyanophycin, a nitrogen-reserve molecule which is a polymer of arginine and asparagine, for use by the organism during the day. Different Cyanothece species metabolize nitrogen-containing compounds through a variety of pathways; all have an arginine decarboxylase, but vary after that point.

To provide the anoxic environment needed by nitrogenase, Cyanothece boosts its respiration as night begins by using its glycogen stores while turning off photosynthesis. In addition, the organisms produce peroxidases and catalases which help scavenge any oxygen left in the cell. The circadian rhythm ensures that this occurs even when the organism is growing in continuous light or continuous darkness. In the dark, the cyanobacteria act as heterotrophs, getting their energy and carbon from the medium. Cyanothece has the genes for the use of a variety of sugar molecules; although glycerol is the only one that has been used successfully to grow Cyanothece in the dark. Many of the genes that are unique to the genera have homologs in anaerobic bacteria, including those responsible for formate production through mixed-acid fermentation and also fermentative lactate production. Some Cyanothece species also are capable of tryptophan degradation, methionine salvage, conversion of stored lipids into carbohydrates, alkane and higher alcohol synthesis, and phosphonate metabolism. They can switch between a photoautotrophic and photoheterotrophic metabolism depending on the environmental conditions that maximize their growth, employing the pathways that use the least amount of energy.

== Genome size, organization, and ploidy options ==
The genomes of many of Cyanothece species have been sequenced, ranging from 4.79 to 7.84 Mbp. Between 4367 and 6642 coding sequences are an amalgamation of genes encoding capabilities for fermentation and aerobic nitrogen fixation (like filamentous cyanobacteria). Unusually, the genes for nitrogen fixation are in a large, contiguous cluster (under the control of multiple promoters), including genes for the uptake hydrogenase, regulators, and transporters. The organism's robust circadian rhythm is apparent in the co-ordination of transcription of correlated processes. Using microarrays, about 30% of 5000 genes tested exhibited diurnal oscillations in 12-hour light/dark conditions, while 10% continued the behavior in continuous light. About 1,705 of the gene groups are >99.5% homologous with other cyanobacteria genera, largely Microcystis and filamentous, nitrogen-fixing strains. Typical GC content is about 40%. Cyanothece species also have three to six plasmids ranging between 10 and 330 kb. Unique to some species of this genus is one to three linear pieces of DNA. The linear DNA encodes enzymes for glucose and pyruvate metabolism (recall that glycerol is the only organic carbon source on which Cyanothece has grown successfully), lactate fermentation, transposons, and CRISPR proteins. Cyanothece species do not typically use homologous recombination, which greatly hinders genetic manipulation; an exception is Cyanothece sp. PCC 7822 in which gene knock-outs can be generated.

== Cell size, growth patterns, sex ==
Cyanothece species are normally oval and longer than 3 μm. They double in 10 to 14 hours in the presence of nitrate, when they do not need to use energy to fix nitrogen, and 16 to 20 hours when fixing nitrogen. They divide by binary fission in one plane that is perpendicular to their longitudinal axis. Daughter cells remain joined for just a short time after division. Cell division does not proceed until the daughter cells reach their mature size and original shape.

== Habitat range ==
Cyanothece has been found in a variety of environments all over the world. One point in common is that the pH is usually lower than 7. Typically they are associated with water in benthic marine environments, rice fields, acidic marshes, peaty bogs, intertidal zones, moors and clear lakes, but sometimes are found in mountain soils.

== Walls and resting cysts ==
Cyanothece species have a thin mucilaginous layer around a thick outer wall that contains spherical, glassy vesicles of unknown function. They have been shown to secrete abundant Extracellular polymeric substances (EPS). The EPS has been used to sequester metals from industrial waste, with more than 90% of Ni^{2+}, Cu^{2+}, and Co^{2+} removed.

== Storage products ==
Cyanothece stores the products of carbon fixation as glycogen granules which they use as an energy source during the "night". These granules form between the thylakoid membranes. The granules are rapidly consumed to boost respiration, so remove the oxygen from the cell at the onset of nitrogen fixation. The carboxysomes contain the carbon-fixing enzyme rubisco and a carbon-concentrating system to boost the enzyme's efficiency. The nitrogen product, cyanophycin, is stored as a granule during nitrogen fixation and is metabolized during the "day".

== Motility ==
Cyanothece species are not flagellated. A twitching motility protein for sp. PCC 8802 is annotated on the protein database UniProtKB.

== Single-celled vs. multicelled ==
Cyanothece species are unicellular. They can be found as free aggregates, but have never been found as a chain.

== Hydrogen production ==
Biohydrogen is being investigated as a clean and renewable energy source. Two main enzymes produce hydrogen in microbes, hydrogenase and nitrogenase; Cyanothece has both enzymes. The nitrogenase fixes nitrogen, releasing hydrogen as a byproduct. The two different hydrogenase enzymes are an uptake hydrogenase associated with the nitrogenase and a bidirectional hydrogenase. When cultures are entrained in light-dark cycles, the nitrogenase and uptake hydrogenase are both active during the "night", with many copies per cell. Western blots show only a few copies of the bidirectional hydrogenase occur at any time. About 300 μmol H_{2}/(mg Chl h) was produced by sp. ATCC 51142 from cultures that were grown in continuous light at 30 μmol photons/(m^{2}s), anaerobic conditions, 50 mM glycerol, and without any nitrate (so the nitrogenase was active). Glycerol in the growth medium reduces the need for carbon fixation, leaving more energy for nitrogen fixation and hydrogen production. It was shown by acetylene reduction that hydrogen generation and nitrogen fixation were directly proportional. A parallel study has demonstrated concomitant and uninterrupted production of both H_{2} and O_{2} in continuously illuminated photobioreactor cultures, upon nitrogen-deprivation of ammonium-limited chemostat growth. Further work on improving the supply of protons and electrons to nitrogenase, as well as protecting it from oxygen could stimulate even better rates.

== See also ==
- Archean Eon of Earth's prehistory
- Bacterial phyla, the other major lineages of domain Bacteria
- Biofertilizer
- Cyanobiont
- Geological history of oxygen
- Great Oxygenation Event
- Green algae
- Phytoplankton
- Synechocystis
