= Mycobacteriophage =

Virus infecting mycobacteria

Mycobacteriophage Bxb1 structure

A mycobacteriophage is a member of a group of bacteriophages known to have mycobacteria as host bacterial species. While originally isolated from the bacterial species Mycobacterium smegmatis and Mycobacterium tuberculosis, the causative agent of tuberculosis, more than 4,200 mycobacteriophage species have since been isolated from various environmental and clinical sources. 2,042 have been completely sequenced. Mycobacteriophages have served as examples of viral lysogeny and of the divergent morphology and genetic arrangement characteristic of many phage types.

All mycobacteriophages found thus far have had double-stranded DNA genomes and have been classified by their structure and appearance into siphoviridae or myoviridae.

== Discovery ==
A bacteriophage found to infect Mycobacterium smegmatis in 1947 was the first documented example of a mycobacteriophage. It was found in cultures of the bacteria originally growing in moist compost. The first bacteriophage that infects M. tuberculosis was discovered in 1954.

== Diversity ==
Thousands of mycobacteriophage have been isolated using a single host strain, Mycobacterium smegmatis mc2155, over 1400 of which have been completely sequenced. These are mostly from environmental samples, but mycobacteriophages have also been isolated from stool samples of tuberculosis patients, although these have yet to be sequenced. About 30 distinct types (called clusters, or singletons if they have no relatives) that share little nucleotide sequence similarity have been identified. Many of the clusters span sufficient diversity that the genomes warrant division into subclusters (Figure 1).

There is also considerable range in overall guanine plus cytosine content (GC%), from 50.3% to 70%, with an average of 64% (M. smegmatis is 67.3%). Thus, phage GC% does not necessarily match that of its host, and the consequent mismatch of codon usage profiles does not appear to be detrimental. Because new mycobacteriophages lacking extensive DNA similarity with the extant collection are still being discovered, and as there are at least seven singletons for which no relatives have been isolated, we clearly have yet to saturate the diversity of this particular population.

The collection of >50,000 genes can be sorted into >3,900 groups (so-called phamilies, i.e. phage protein families) according to their shared amino acid sequences. Most of these phamilies (~75%) do not have homologues outside of the mycobacteriophages and are of unknown function. Genetic studies with mycobacteriophage Giles show that 45% of the genes are nonessential for lytic growth.

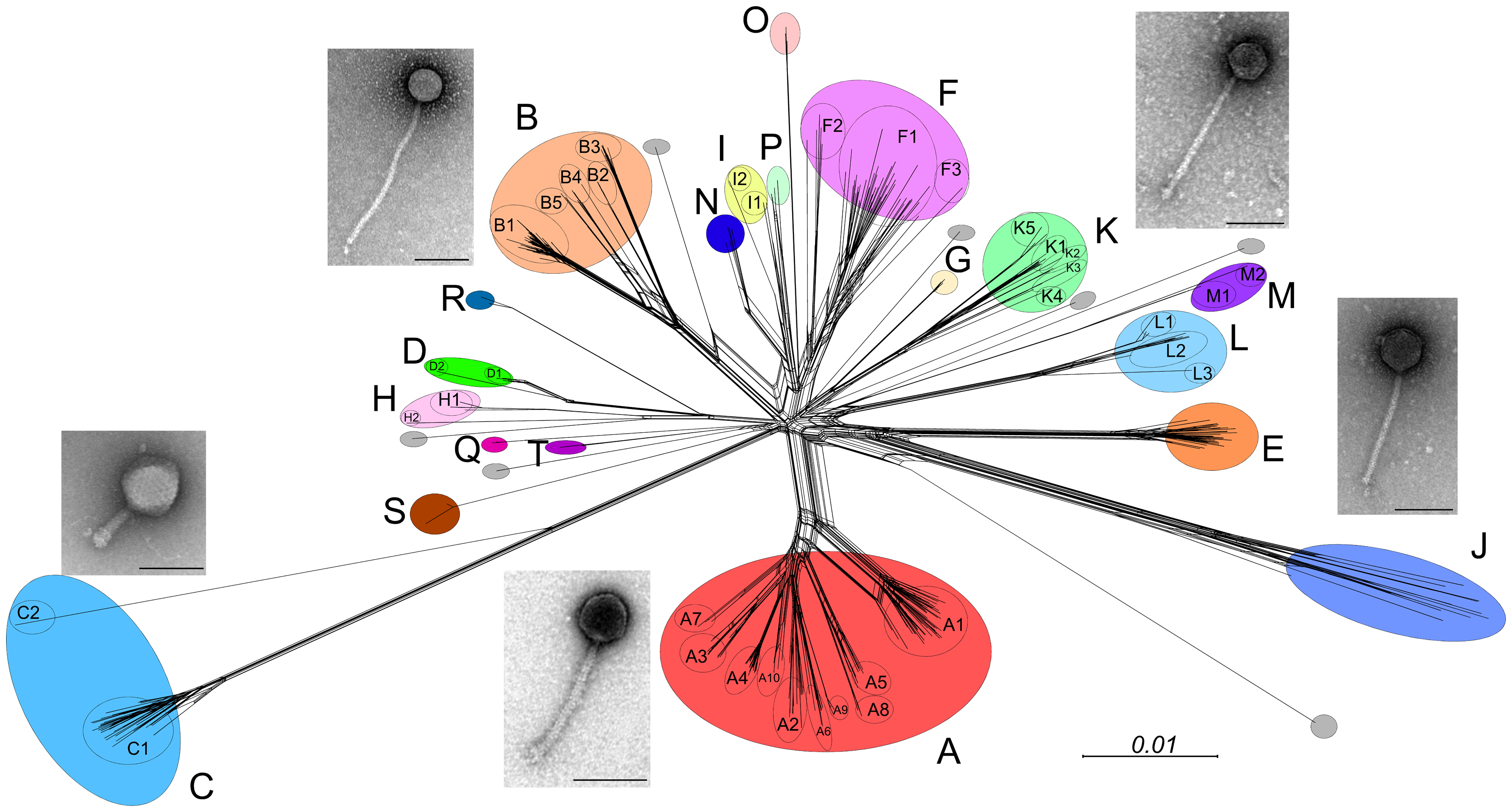
Figure 1. Diversity of mycobacteriophages. Sequenced genomes for 471 mycobacteriophages were compared according to their shared gene contents and overall nucleotide sequence similarity. Colored circles encompass Clusters A–T as indicated, and grey circles represent singleton genomes that have no close relatives. A1, A2, A3... indicate subclusters. Micrographs show the morphotypes of the myoviral Cluster C phages and the siphoviruses (all others) that primarily differ in tail length (scale bars: 100 nm). With the exception of DS6A (a singleton), all phages infect M. smegmatis mc2155. Cluster K phages and a subset of Cluster A phages also infect M. tuberculosis. From Hatfull 2014

As of May 2023, the PhagesDB website lists 12579 reported mycobacteriophages, 2257 of which having been sequenced. Around one-third of the sequenced phages fall into cluster "A", which contains L5.

=== Taxonomy ===
In line with the clustering results by phageDB, mycobacteriophages are split into many places on the ICTV's virus taxonomy tree. Some examples are:

- Phage L5 and its relatives are classified as Fromanvirus. See Mycobacterium virus L5.
- ZoeJ and TM4 are classified as Timquatrovirus (named after TM4).
- Phage "Corndog" is classified as Corndogvirus.

== Host range ==
Host range analysis shows that not all mycobacteriophages from M. smegmatis infect other strains and only phages in Cluster K and in certain subclusters of Cluster A efficiently infect M. tuberculosis (Figure 1). However, mutants can be readily isolated from some phages that expand their host range to infect these other strains. However, the molecular basis of host range depends on the behavior and presence of specific genes. This raises the probability of a correlation between gene phamilies and the preferred host.

The realms of mycobacteriophage infection are not understood in its entirety because it involves various mechanisms including receptor availability, restriction-modification, abortive infection, and more. These mechanisms can be mediated through several processes like clustered regulatory interspaced short palindromic repeats (CRISPRs) and the translational apparatus being modified. Phages overcome these constraints by evolving, spontaneous mutation, and diversifying.

== Genome architecture ==
The first sequenced mycobacteriophage genome was that of mycobacteriophage L5 in 1993. In the following years hundreds of additional genomes have been sequenced. Mycobacteriophages have highly mosaic genomes. Their genome sequences show evidence of extensive horizontal genetic transfer, both between phages and between phages and their mycobacterial hosts. Comparisons of these sequences have helped to explain how frequently genetic exchanges of this type may occur in nature, as well as how phages may contribute to bacterial pathogenicity.

A selection of 60 mycobacteriophages were isolated and had their genomes sequenced in 2009. These genome sequences were grouped into clusters by several methods in an effort to determine similarities between the phages and to explore their genetic diversity. More than half of the phage species were originally found in or near Pittsburgh, Pennsylvania, though others were found in other United States locations, India, and Japan. No distinct differences were found in the genomes of mycobacteriophage species from different global origins. Mycobacteriophage genomes have been found to contain a subset of genes undergoing more rapid genetic flux than other elements of the genomes. These "rapid flux" genes are exchanged between mycobacteriophage more often and are 50 percent shorter in sequence than the average mycobacteriophage gene.

== Applications ==
Historically, mycobacteriophage have been used to "type" (i.e. "diagnose") mycobacteria, as each phage infects only one or a few bacterial strains. In the 1980s phages were discovered as tools to genetically manipulate their hosts. For instance, phage TM4 was used to construct shuttle phasmids that replicate as large cosmids in Escherichia coli and as phages in mycobacteria.

Phages with mycobacterial hosts may be especially useful for understanding and fighting mycobacterial infections in humans. A system has been developed to use mycobacteriophage carrying a reporter gene to screen strains of M. tuberculosis for antibiotic resistance. In the future, mycobacteriophage could be used to treat infections by phage therapy.

In 2019 it was reported that three mycobacteriophages were administered intravenously twice daily to a 15 year-old girl with cystic fibrosis and disseminated M. abscessus subsp. massiliense infection that occurred following lung transplant. The patient had clear benefit from treatment, and the phage treatment combined with antibiotics was extended for several years. In 2022 it was reported that two mycobacteriophages were administered intravenously twice daily to a young man with treatment-refractory M. abscessus subsp. abscessus pulmonary infection and severe cystic fibrosis lung disease. Airway cultures for M. abscessus became negative after approximately 100 days of combined phage and antibiotic treatment, and a variety of biomarkers confirmed the therapeutic response. The individual received a bilateral lung transplant after 379 days of treatment, and cultures from the explanted lung tissue confirmed eradication of the bacteria.
