= H2 producing hydrogenase =

H2 producing hydrogenase may refer to:

- Ferredoxin hydrogenase, an enzyme
- Hydrogenase (acceptor), an enzyme
