= Rhamnopyranosyl-N-acetylglucosaminyl-diphospho-decaprenol beta-1,3/1,4-galactofuranosyltransferase =

Class of enzymes

Identifiers
- EC no.: 2.4.1.287

Databases
- IntEnz: IntEnz view
- BRENDA: BRENDA entry
- ExPASy: NiceZyme view
- KEGG: KEGG entry
- MetaCyc: metabolic pathway
- PRIAM: profile
- PDB structures: RCSB PDB PDBe PDBsum
Search
- PMC: articles
- PubMed: articles
- NCBI: proteins

Rhamnopyranosyl-N-acetylglucosaminyl-diphospho-decaprenol beta-1,3/1,4-galactofuranosyltransferase (EC 2.4.1.287, arabinogalactan galactofuranosyl transferase 1, GlfT1) is an enzyme with systematic name UDP-alpha-D-galactofuranose:alpha-L-rhamnopyranosyl-(1->3)-N-acetyl-alpha-D-glucosaminyl-diphospho-trans,octacis-decaprenol 3-beta/4-beta-galactofuranosyltransferase. This enzyme catalyses the following chemical reaction

2 UDP-alpha-D-galactofuranose + alpha-L-rhamnopyranosyl-(1->3)-N-acetyl-alpha-D-glucosaminyl-diphospho-trans,octacis-decaprenol $\rightleftharpoons$ 2 UDP + beta-D-galactofuranosyl-(1->5)-beta-D-galactofuranosyl-(1->4)-alpha-L-rhamnopyranosyl-(1->3)-N-acetyl-alpha-D-glucosaminyl-diphospho-trans,octacis-decaprenol (overall reaction)

(1a) UDP-alpha-D-galactofuranose + alpha-L-rhamnopyranosyl-(1->3)-N-acetyl-alpha-D-glucosaminyl-diphospho-trans-octacis-decaprenol $\rightleftharpoons$ UDP + beta-D-galactofuranosyl-(1->4)-alpha-L-rhamnopyranosyl-(1->3)-N-acetyl-alpha-D-glucosaminyl-diphospho-trans-octacis-decaprenol
(1b) UDP-alpha-D-galactofuranose + beta-D-galactofuranosyl-(1->4)-alpha-L-rhamnopyranosyl-(1->3)-N-acetyl-alpha-D-glucosaminyl-diphospho-trans-octacis-decaprenol $\rightleftharpoons$ UDP + beta-D-galactofuranosyl-(1->5)-beta-D-galactofuranosyl-(1->4)-alpha-L-rhamnopyranosyl-(1->3)-N-acetyl-alpha-D-glucosaminyl-diphospho-trans-octacis-decaprenol

This enzyme is isolated from Mycobacterium tuberculosis and M. smegmatis.
