= Ms1 small RNA =

Ms1 sRNA
- Predicted secondary structure and sequence conservation of Ms1 small RNA

Identifiers
- Rfam: RF02566

Other data
- Domain: Bacteria
- GO: GO:0070063
- SO: SO:0000370
- PDB structures: PDBe

Mycobacterium smegmatis small RNA 1 (Ms1 small RNA) is an RNA strand produced by Mycobacterium smegmatis. Highly expressed during stationary phase of growth, Ms1 RNA directly interacts with RNA polymerase (RNAP). but in a different way than 6S, which is present in other bacteria. Ms1 does not require the presence of the main sigma factor for RNAP interaction. There is evidence that Ms1 RNA may function similar to 6S RNA in M. smegmatis which does not have 6S RNA.
