= Sandeep Verma =

Indian scientist and professor (born 1966)

- Education: University of Illinois Medical Center; Johns Hopkins University; Max Planck Institute for Experimental Medicine
- Known for: Studies on Ordered Peptide Assemblies, Metal-Mediated Systems, New Antimicrobials, and Small Molecule Stem Cell Interaction.
- Awards: 2003 B. M. Birla Science Prize; 2005 Swarnajayanti Fellowship in Chemical Sciences; 2005 CRSI Bronze Medal; 2010 Shanti Swarup Bhatnagar Prize; 2017 CRSI Silver Medal; 2019 Goyal Prize in Chemical Sciences
- Scientific career
- Fields: Bioorganic chemistry
- Workplaces: Banaras Hindu University; IIT Kanpur; IISER, Bhopal

Sandeep Verma is an Indian bioorganic chemist and chemical biologist, and a Professor in the Department of Chemistry at the Indian Institute of Technology, Kanpur (IITK). At IITK, he heads Sandeep Verma's Research Group in the areas of ordered peptide assemblies, microfluidic diagnostic systems, programmable soft matter for neuronal regeneration, novel antimicrobials, and small molecule-stem cell modulation. He is an elected fellow of the Indian National Science Academy (INSA), the Indian Academy of Sciences, the National Academy of Sciences, India, and the Indian National Academy of Engineering. The Council of Scientific and Industrial Research, the apex agency of the Government of India for scientific research, awarded him the Shanti Swarup Bhatnagar Prize for Science and Technology, one of the highest Indian science awards, in 2010, for his contributions to Chemical Sciences. In the years 2011 and 2013, he was awarded a Senior Fellowship of the Zukunftskollegs at the University of Konstanz. At present, he is heading the Gangwal School of Medical Sciences and Technology, IIT Kanpur [https://iitk.ac.in/webtheme/gsmst/].

== Biography ==
Born in Kanpur in the Indian state of Uttar Pradesh, Sandeep Verma did his early schooling in Varanasi and completed his Master's degree at Banaras Hindu University in 1989. Subsequently, he secured a PhD from the University of Illinois Medical Center, Chicago in 1994 and he did his post-doctoral work, first at Johns Hopkins University and later at the Max Planck Institute for Experimental Medicine. He joined the Indian Institute of Technology, Kanpur as an Assistant Professor and is currently working as a Professor.

== Research Profile ==
Verma's researches may broadly be classified into four segments: Ordered Peptide Assemblies, Metal-Mediated Systems, New Antimicrobials and Small Molecule Stem Cell Interaction. He is credited with the synthesis of enzyme mimics using metal-mediated systems and his group is involved in developing bio-inspired soft matter and protocols for using biological building blocks as diagnostic tools for diseases. His research has been documented in a number of peer-reviewed articles, reviews and book chapters. He serves as an Associate Editor of Chemical Communications (RSC, UK) and served on the Editorial Advisory Boards of Cell Chemical Biology, ChemBioChem and Journal of Peptide Science.

== Awards and honours ==
Verma won the Jawaharlal Nehru Memorial Fund Award, P. M. Bhargava Medal and BHU Vice Chancellor's Gold Medal for academic excellence in master's degree examination in 1989, and the J. Watumull Endowed Award of the University of Illinois at Chicago in 1993. He won the B. M. Birla Science Prize (2003), Swarnajayanti Fellowship (2005) in Chemical Sciences, and Bronze Medal (2005) of the Chemical Research Society of India. The Council of Scientific and Industrial Research awarded him the Shanti Swarup Bhatnagar Prize, one of the highest Indian science awards, in 2010. He was bestowed with Doctor of Philosophy (Honoris Causa) by Goethe University Frankfurt (Germany) and Doctor of Science (Honoris Causa) by Amity University Rajasthan, Jaipur, in 2025 [https://aktuelles.uni-frankfurt.de/en/forschung/chemiker-sandeep-verma-erhaelt-ehrendoktorwuerde-der-goethe-universitaet/] [https://www.linkedin.com/posts/amityuniversityjaipur_aurconvocation2024-amityuniversityjaipur-activity-7301923571184885760-YG0w/].

He is an elected fellow of the Indian National Science Academy (INSA), Indian Academy of Sciences, the National Academy of Sciences, India, the Indian National Academy of Engineering (INAE) and a Senior Fellow of the Zukunftskolleg, University of Konstanz, Germany. He was awarded the Silver Medal (2017) of the Chemical Research Society of India, National Prize for Research on Interfaces between Chemistry and Biology (2017), MRSI-ICSC Superconductivity & Materials Science Annual Prize (2018), Materials Research Society of India, Goyal Prize (2019) in Chemical Sciences, the Distinguished Alumnus Award (2020), Banaras Hindu University, and more recently, the Society of Materials Chemistry Gold Medal - 2022, Bhabha Atomic Research Center, Mumbai.

== Science Governance ==
Sandeep Verma served as the Secretary of the Science and Engineering Research Board (SERB) from April 2019 till October 2022.

== See also ==
- Enzyme mimic
