= Beta-mannosylphosphodecaprenol—mannooligosaccharide 6-mannosyltransferase =

Enzyme

Beta-mannosylphosphodecaprenol---mannooligosaccharide 6-mannosyltransferase

Identifiers
- EC no.: 2.4.1.199
- CAS no.: 125008-27-7

Databases
- IntEnz: IntEnz view
- BRENDA: BRENDA entry
- ExPASy: NiceZyme view
- KEGG: KEGG entry
- MetaCyc: metabolic pathway
- PRIAM: profile
- PDB structures: RCSB PDB PDBe PDBsum
Search
- PMC: articles
- PubMed: articles
- NCBI: proteins

Beta-mannosylphosphodecaprenol---mannooligosaccharide 6-mannosyltransferase (EC 2.4.1.199, mannosylphospholipid-methylmannoside alpha-1,6-mannosyltransferase, beta-D-mannosylphosphodecaprenol:1,6-alpha-D-mannosyloligosaccharide 1,6-alpha-D-mannosyltransferase) is an enzyme with systematic name beta-D-mannosylphosphodecaprenol:(1->6)-alpha-D-mannosyloligosaccharide 6-alpha-D-mannosyltransferase. This enzyme catalyses the following chemical reaction

beta-D-mannosylphosphodecaprenol + (1->6)-alpha-D-mannosyloligosaccharide $\rightleftharpoons$ decaprenol phosphate + (1->6)-alpha-D-mannosyl-(1->6)-alpha-D-mannosyl-oligosaccharide

This enzyme is involved in the formation of mannooligosaccharides in the membrane of Mycobacterium smegmatis.
