= Bis(p-nitrophenyl) phosphate =

Names
- IUPAC name Bis(4-nitrophenyl) hydrogen phosphate
- Other names: Phosphoric acid, bis(4-nitrophenyl) ester; Phosphoric acid, bis(p-nitrophenyl) ester; Di-p-nitrophenyl phosphate; BNPP; Bis-PNPP

Identifiers
CAS Number	645-15-8
3D model (JSmol)	Interactive image
ChEBI	CHEBI:3122
ChEMBL	ChEMBL1231178
ChemSpider	250
DrugBank	DB07418
ECHA InfoCard	100.010.396
EC Number	211-434-7
KEGG	C03779
PubChem CID	255
UNII	1MF77LEI63
CompTox Dashboard (EPA)	DTXSID20870742
- InChI: InChI=1S/C12H9N2O8P/c15-13(16)9-1-5-11(6-2-9)21-23(19,20)22-12-7-3-10(4-8-12)14(17)18/h1-8H,(H,19,20) Key: MHSVUSZEHNVFKW-UHFFFAOYSA-N
- SMILES: C1=CC(=CC=C1[N+](=O)[O-])OP(=O)(O)OC2=CC=C(C=C2)[N+](=O)[O-]

Properties
Chemical formula	C_{12}H_{9}N_{2}O_{8}P
Molar mass	340.184 g·mol^{−1}
Melting point	175 °C (347 °F; 448 K)
Acidity (pK_{a})	1.04 (predicted)
Conjugate base	(C_{6}H_{4}NO_{2})_{2}PO^{−}_{4}

Hazards
- GHS labelling
Pictograms	(GHS06: Toxic)
Signal word	Danger
Hazard statements	H300
Precautionary statements	P264, P270, P301+P310+P330, P405, P501
- Safety data sheet (SDS)
- Except where otherwise noted, data are given for materials in their standard state (at 25 °C [77 °F], 100 kPa). Infobox references

Bis(p-nitrophenyl) phosphate or BNPP is an organophosphate. It is an enzyme inhibitor for carboxylesterase and glycosyltransferases, and a model compound for the hydrolysis of DNA by phosphodiesterases. The neutral compound has the chemical formula (C_{6}H_{4}NO_{2})_{2}PO_{3}OH; at physiological pH, it exists as the conjugate base (C_{6}H_{4}NO_{2})_{2}PO^{−}_{4}.

== Applications ==
BNPP is used as a substitute for DNA to study the enzymatic hydrolysis of phosphodiesters, and to evaluate synthetic enzyme mimics. While the compound was first synthesised in the 1950s or 1960s, it only became widely used beginning in the 1990s. It has several advantages as a model compound for this reaction: it reacts more quickly than many natural phosphodiesters, and the leaving group, nitrophenol, is readily identified using spectrophotometry.
