= Starch synthase (maltosyl-transferring) =

Class of enzymes

Identifiers
- EC no.: 2.4.99.16

Databases
- IntEnz: IntEnz view
- BRENDA: BRENDA entry
- ExPASy: NiceZyme view
- KEGG: KEGG entry
- MetaCyc: metabolic pathway
- PRIAM: profile
- PDB structures: RCSB PDB PDBe PDBsum
Search
- PMC: articles
- PubMed: articles
- NCBI: proteins

Starch synthase (maltosyl-transferring) (EC 2.4.99.16, alpha1,4-glucan:maltose-1-P maltosyltransferase, GMPMT) is an enzyme with systematic name alpha-maltose 1-phosphate:(1->4)-alpha-D-glucan 4-alpha-D-maltosyltransferase. This enzyme catalyses the following chemical reaction

alpha-maltose 1-phosphate + [(1->4)-alpha-D-glucosyl]n $\rightleftharpoons$ phosphate + [(1->4)-alpha-D-glucosyl]n+2

The enzyme from the bacterium Mycobacterium smegmatis is specific for maltose.
