= Hydrogenase =

Class of enzymes that catalyse the reversible oxidation of molecular hydrogen

A hydrogenase is an enzyme that catalyses the reversible oxidation of molecular hydrogen (H_{2}), as shown below:

H_{2} + A_{ox} → 2 H^{+} + A_{red}	1

2 H^{+} + D_{red} → H_{2} + D_{ox}	2

Hydrogen oxidation (1) is coupled to the reduction of electron acceptors such as oxygen, nitrate, ferric ion, sulfate, carbon dioxide (CO_{2}), and fumarate. On the other hand, proton reduction (2) is coupled to the oxidation of electron donors such as ferredoxin (FNR), and serves to dispose excess electrons in cells (essential in pyruvate fermentation). Both low-molecular weight compounds and proteins such as FNRs, cytochrome c_{3}, and cytochrome c_{6} can act as physiological electron donors or acceptors for hydrogenases.

== Structural classification ==
It has been estimated that 99% of all organisms utilize hydrogen, H_{2}. Most of these species are microbes and their ability to use H_{2} as a metabolite arises from the expression of metalloenzymes known as hydrogenases. Hydrogenases are sub-classified into three different types based on the active site metal content: nickel-iron hydrogenase, iron-iron hydrogenase, and iron hydrogenase.

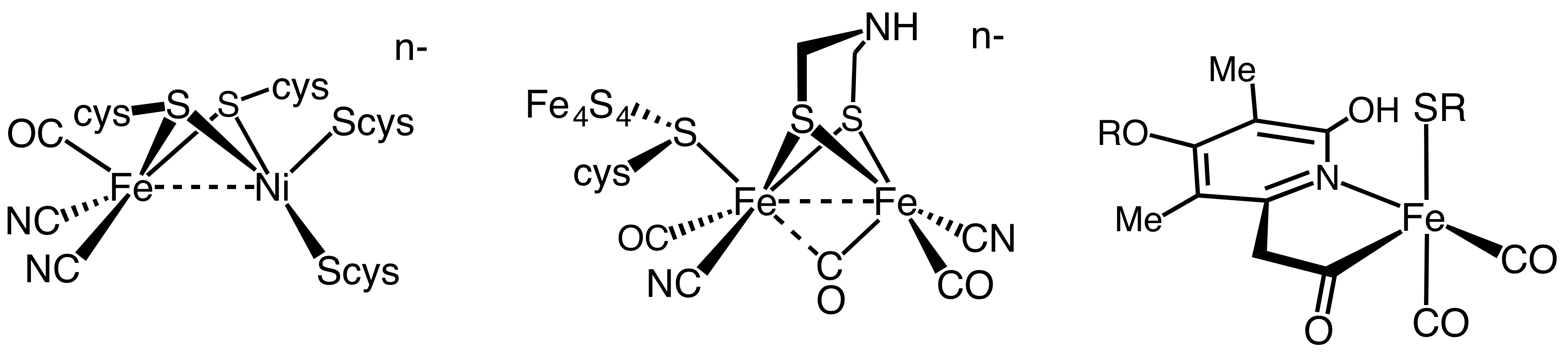
The structures of the active sites of the three types of hydrogenase enzymes.

Hydrogenases catalyze, sometimes reversibly, H_{2} uptake. The [FeFe] and [NiFe] hydrogenases are true redox catalysts, driving H_{2} oxidation and proton (H^{+}) reduction (equation 3), the [Fe] hydrogenases catalyze the reversible heterolytic cleavage of H_{2} shown by reaction (4).

H_{2} ⇌ 2 H^{+} + 2 e^{−}	3

H_{2} ⇌ H^{+} + H^{−}	4

Although originally believed to be "metal-free", the [Fe]-only hydrogenases contain Fe at the active site and no iron-sulfur clusters. [NiFe] and [FeFe] hydrogenases have some common features in their structures: Each enzyme has an active site and a few Fe-S clusters that are buried in protein. The active site, which is believed to be the place where catalysis takes place, is also a metallocluster, and each iron is coordinated by carbon monoxide (CO) and cyanide (CN^{−}) ligands.

=== [NiFe] hydrogenase ===
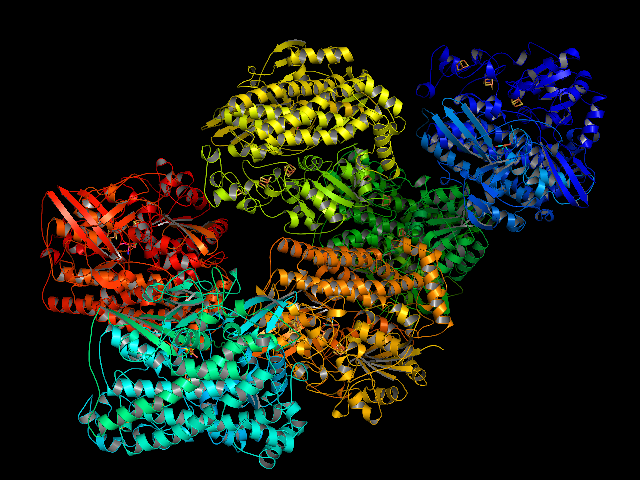
Crystal structure of [NiFe] hydrogenase

The [NiFe] hydrogenases are heterodimeric proteins consisting of small (S) and large (L) subunits. The small subunit contains three iron-sulfur clusters while the large subunit contains the active site, a nickel-iron centre which is connected to the solvent by a molecular tunnel. In some [NiFe] hydrogenases, one of the Ni-bound cysteine residues is replaced by selenocysteine. On the basis of sequence similarity, however, the [NiFe] and [NiFeSe] hydrogenases should be considered a single superfamily. To date, periplasmic, cytoplasmic, and cytoplasmic membrane-bound hydrogenases have been found. The [NiFe] hydrogenases, when isolated, are found to catalyse both H_{2} evolution and uptake, with low-potential multihaem cytochromes such as cytochrome c_{3} acting as either electron donors or acceptors, depending on their oxidation state. Generally speaking, however, [NiFe] hydrogenases are more active in oxidizing H_{2}. A wide spectrum of H_{2} affinities have also been observed in H_{2}-oxidizing hydrogenases.

Like [FeFe] hydrogenases, [NiFe] hydrogenases are known to be usually deactivated by molecular oxygen (O_{2}). Hydrogenase from Ralstonia eutropha, and several other so-called Knallgas-bacteria, were found to be oxygen-tolerant. The soluble [NiFe] hydrogenase from Ralstonia eutropha H16 can be conveniently produced on heterotrophic growth media. This finding increased hope that hydrogenases can be used in photosynthetic production of molecular hydrogen via splitting water. Another [NiFe], called Huc or Hyd1 or cyanobacterial-type uptake hydrogenase, has been found to be oxygen insensitive while having a very high affinity for hydrogen. Hydrogen is able to penetrate narrow channels in the enzyme that oxygen molecules cannot enter. This allows bacteria such as Mycobacterium smegmatis to utilize the small amount of hydrogen in the atmosphere as a source of energy when other sources are lacking.

=== [FeFe] hydrogenase ===
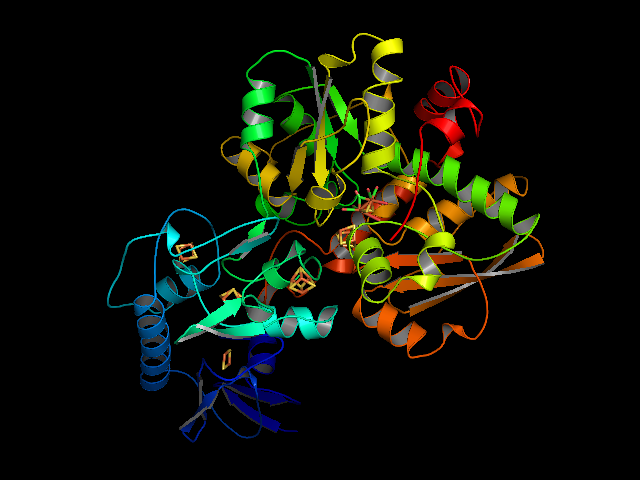
Crystal structure of [FeFe] hydrogenase

The hydrogenases containing a di-iron center with a bridging dithiolate cofactor are called [FeFe] hydrogenases. Three families of [FeFe] hydrogenases are recognized:

- cytoplasmic, soluble, monomeric hydrogenases, found in strict anaerobes such as Clostridium pasteurianum and Megasphaera elsdenii. They catalyse both H_{2} evolution and uptake.
- periplasmic, heterodimeric hydrogenases from Desulfovibrio spp., which can be purified aerobically.
- soluble, monomeric hydrogenases, found in chloroplasts of green alga Scenedesmus obliquus, catalyses H_{2} evolution. The [Fe_{2}S_{2}] ferredoxin functions as natural electron donor linking the enzyme to the photosynthetic electron transport chain.

In contrast to [NiFe] hydrogenases, [FeFe] hydrogenases are generally more active in production of molecular hydrogen. Turnover frequency (TOF) in the order of 10,000 s^{−1} have been reported in literature for [FeFe] hydrogenases from Clostridium pasteurianum. This has led to intense research focusing on use of [FeFe] hydrogenase for sustainable production of H_{2}.

The active site of the diiron hydrogenase is known as the H-cluster. The H-cluster consists of a [4Fe4S] cubane-shaped structure, coupled to the low valent diiron co-factor by a cysteine derived thiol. The diiron co-factor includes two iron atoms, connected by a bridging aza-dithiolate ligand (-SCH_{2}-NH-CH_{2}S-, adt), the iron atoms are coordinated by carbonyl and cyanide ligands.

[FeFe]-hydrogenases can be separated into four distinct phylogenetic groups A−D. Group A consists of prototypical and bifurcating [FeFe]-hydrogenases. In nature, prototypical [FeFe]-hydrogenases perform hydrogen turnover using ferredoxin as a redox partner while bifurcating types perform the same reaction using both ferredoxin and NAD(H) as electron donor or acceptor. In order to conserve energy, anaerobic bacteria use electron bifurcation where exergonic and endergonic redox reactions are coupled to circumvent thermodynamic barriers. Group A comprises the best characterized and catalytically most active enzymes such as the [FeFe]-hydrogenase from Chlamydomonas reinhardtii (CrHydA1), Desulfovibrio desulfuricans (DdHydAB or DdH), and Clostridium pasteurianum and Clostridium acetobutylicum (CpHydA1 and CaHydA1, referred to as CpI and CaI). No representative examples of Group B has been characterized yet but it is phylogenetically distinct even when it shares similar amino acid motifs around the H-cluster as Group A [FeFe]-hydrogenases. Group C has been classified as "sensory" based on the presence of a Per-Arnt-Sim domain. One example of a Group C [FeFe]-hydrogenase is from Thermotoga maritima (TmHydS) which shows only modest catalytic rates compared to Group A enzymes and an apparent high sensitivity toward hydrogen (H_{2}). A closely related subclass from Group D has a similar location on the bacterial gene and share similar domain structure to a subclass from Group E but it lacks the PAS domain. Within Group D, the [FeFe]-hydrogenase from Thermoanaerobacter mathranii (referred to as Tam HydS) has been characterized.

=== [Fe]-only hydrogenase ===
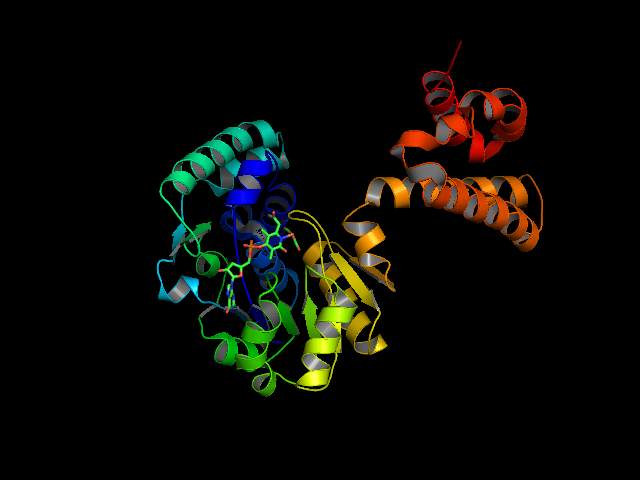
Crystal structure of [Fe] hydrogenase

5,10-methenyltetrahydromethanopterin hydrogenase (EC 1.12.98.2) found in methanogenic Archaea contains neither nickel nor iron-sulfur clusters but an iron-containing cofactor that was recently characterized by X-ray diffraction.

Unlike the other two types, [Fe]-only hydrogenases are found only in some hydrogenotrophic methanogenic archaea. They also feature a fundamentally different enzymatic mechanism in terms of redox partners and how electrons are delivered to the active site. In [NiFe] and [FeFe] hydrogenases, electrons travel through a series of metallorganic clusters that comprise a long distance; the active site structures remain unchanged during the whole process. In [Fe]-only hydrogenases, however, electrons are directly delivered to the active site via a short distance. Methenyl-H4MPT^{+}, a cofactor, directly accepts the hydride from H_{2} in the process. [Fe]-only hydrogenase is also known as H_{2}-forming methylenetetrahydromethanopterin (methylene-H4MPT) dehydrogenase, because its function is the reversible reduction of methenyl-H4MPT^{+} to methylene-H4MPT. The hydrogenation of a methenyl-H4MPT+ occurs instead of H_{2} oxidation/production, which is the case for the other two types of hydrogenases. While the exact mechanism of the catalysis is still under study, recent finding suggests that molecular hydrogen is first heterolytically cleaved by Fe(II), followed by transfer of hydride to the carbocation of the acceptor.

== Mechanism ==
The molecular mechanism by which protons are converted into hydrogen molecules within hydrogenases is still under extensive study. One popular approach employs mutagenesis to elucidate roles of amino acids and/or ligands in different steps of catalysis such as intramolecular transport of substrates. For instance, Cornish et al. conducted mutagenesis studies and found out that four amino acids located along the putative channel connecting the active site and protein surface are critical to enzymatic function of [FeFe] hydrogenase from Clostridium pasteurianum (CpI). On the other hand, one can also rely on computational analysis and simulations. Nilsson Lill and Siegbahn have recently taken this approach in investigating the mechanism by which [NiFe] hydrogenases catalyze H_{2} cleavage. The two approaches are complementary and can benefit one another. In fact, Cao and Hall combined both approaches in developing the model that describes how hydrogen molecules are oxidized or produced within the active site of [FeFe] hydrogenases. While more research and experimental data are required to complete our understanding of the mechanism, these findings have allowed scientists to apply the knowledge in, e.g., building artificial catalysts mimicking active sites of hydrogenases.

== Biological function ==
Assuming that the Earth's atmosphere was initially rich in hydrogen, scientists hypothesize that hydrogenases were evolved to generate energy from/as molecular H_{2}. Accordingly, hydrogenases can either help microorganisms to proliferate under such conditions, or to set up ecosystems empowered by H_{2}. Microbial communities driven by molecular hydrogen have, in fact, been found in deep-sea settings where other sources of energy from photosynthesis are not available. Based on these grounds, the primary role of hydrogenases are believed to be energy generation, and this can be sufficient to sustain an ecosystem.

Recent studies have revealed other biological functions of hydrogenases. To begin with, bidirectional hydrogenases can also act as "valves" to control excess reducing equivalents, especially in photosynthetic microorganisms. Such a role makes hydrogenases play a vital role in anaerobic metabolism. Moreover, hydrogenases may also be involved in membrane-linked energy conservation through the generation of a transmembrane protonmotive force.^{[15]}There is a possibility that hydrogenases have been responsible for bioremediation of chlorinated compounds. Hydrogenases proficient in H_{2} uptake can help heavy metal contaminants to be recovered in intoxicated forms. These uptake hydrogenases have been recently discovered in pathogenic bacteria and parasites and are believed to be involved in their virulence.^{[15]}

== Applications ==
Hydrogenases were first discovered in the 1930s, and they have since attracted interest from many researchers including inorganic chemists who have synthesized a variety of hydrogenase mimics. The soluble [NiFe] hydrogenase from Ralstonia eutropha H16 is a promising candidate enzyme for H_{2}-based biofuel application as it favours H_{2} oxidation and is relatively oxygen-tolerant. It can be produced on heterotrophic growth media and purified via anion exchange and size exclusion chromatography matrices. Understanding the catalytic mechanism of hydrogenase might help scientists design clean biological energy sources, such as algae, that produce hydrogen.

=== Biological hydrogen production ===
Various systems are capable of splitting water into O_{2} and H^{+} from incident sunlight. Likewise, numerous catalysts, either chemical or biological, can reduce the produced H^{+} into H_{2}. Different catalysts require unequal overpotential for this reduction reaction to take place. Hydrogenases are attractive since they require a relatively low overpotential. In fact, its catalytic activity is more effective than platinum, which is the best-known catalyst for the H_{2} evolution reaction. Among three different types of hydrogenases, [FeFe] hydrogenases is considered as a strong candidate for an integral part of the solar H_{2} production system since they offer an additional advantage of high TOF (over 9000 s^{−1})^{[6]}.

Low overpotential and high catalytic activity of [FeFe] hydrogenases are accompanied by high O_{2} sensitivity. It is necessary to engineer them O_{2}-tolerant for use in solar H_{2} production since O_{2} is a by-product of water splitting reaction. Past research efforts by various groups worldwide have focused on understanding the mechanisms involved in O_{2}-inactivation of hydrogenases. For instance, Stripp et al. relied on protein film electrochemistry and discovered that O_{2} first converts into a reactive species at the active site of [FeFe] hydrogenases, and then damages its [4Fe-4S] domain. Cohen et al. investigated how oxygen can reach the active site that is buried inside the protein body by molecular dynamics simulation approach; their results indicate that O_{2} diffuses through mainly two pathways that are formed by enlargement of and interconnection between cavities during dynamic motion. These works, in combination with other reports, suggest that inactivation is governed by two phenomena: diffusion of O_{2} to the active site, and destructive modification of the active site.

Despite these findings, research is still underway to engineer oxygen tolerance in hydrogenases. While researchers have found oxygen-tolerant [NiFe] hydrogenases, they are only efficient in hydrogen uptake and not production^{[21]}. Bingham et al.'s recent success in engineering [FeFe] hydrogenase from Clostridium pasteurianum was also limited to retained activity (during exposure to oxygen) for H_{2} consumption only.

=== Hydrogenase-based biofuel cells ===
Typical enzymatic biofuel cells involve the usage of enzymes as electrocatalysts at either both cathode and anode or at one electrode. In hydrogenase-based biofuel cells, hydrogenase enzymes are present at the anode for H_{2} oxidation.

==== Principle ====
The bidirectional or reversible reaction catalyzed by hydrogenase allows for the capture and storage of renewable energy as fuel with use on demand. This can be demonstrated through the chemical storage of electricity obtained from a renewable source (e.g. solar, wind, hydrothermal) as H_{2} during periods of low energy demands. When energy is desired, H_{2} can be oxidized to produce electricity.

==== Advantages ====
This is one solution to the challenge in the development of technologies for the capture and storage of renewable energy as fuel with use on demand. The generation of electricity from H_{2} is comparable with the similar functionality of Platinum catalysts minus the catalyst poisoning, and thus is very efficient. In the case of H_{2}/O_{2} fuel cells, where the product is water, there is no production of greenhouse gases.

== Biochemical classification ==
EC 1.12.1.2

hydrogen dehydrogenase (hydrogen:NAD^{+} oxidoreductase)

H_{2} + NAD^{+} ⇌ H^{+} + NADH

EC 1.12.1.3

hydrogen dehydrogenase (NADP) (hydrogen:NADPH^{+} oxidoreductase)

H_{2} + NADP^{+} ⇌ H^{+} + NADPH

EC 1.12.2.1

cytochrome-c_{3} hydrogenase (hydrogen:ferricytochrome-c_{3} oxidoreductase)

2H_{2} + ferricytochrome c_{3} ⇌ 4H^{+} + ferrocytochrome c_{3}

EC 1.12.5.1

hydrogen:quinone oxidoreductase

H_{2} + menaquinone ⇌ menaquinol

EC 1.12.7.2

ferredoxin hydrogenase (hydrogen:ferredoxin oxidoreductase)

H_{2} + oxidized ferredoxin ⇌ 2H^{+} + reduced ferredoxin

EC 1.12.98.1

coenzyme F_{420} hydrogenase (hydrogen:coenzyme F_{420} oxidoreductase)

H_{2} + coenzyme F_{420} ⇌ reduced coenzyme F_{420}

EC 1.12.99.6

hydrogenase (acceptor) (hydrogen:acceptor oxidoreductase)

H_{2} + A ⇌ AH_{2}

EC 1.12.98.2

5,10-methenyltetrahydromethanopterin hydrogenase (hydrogen:5,10-methenyltetrahydromethanopterin oxidoreductase)

H_{2} + 5,10-methenyltetrahydromethanopterin ⇌ H^{+} + 5,10-methylenetetrahydromethanopterin

EC 1.12.98.3

Methanosarcina-phenazine hydrogenase [hydrogen:2-(2,3-dihydropentaprenyloxy)phenazine oxidoreductase]

H_{2} + 2-(2,3-dihydropentaprenyloxy)phenazine ⇌ 2-dihydropentaprenyloxyphenazine
