= Mycobacterium virus Packman =

Bacteriophage Packman

Virus classification
- (unranked): Virus
- Realm: Duplodnaviria
- Kingdom: Heunggongvirae
- Phylum: Uroviricota
- Class: Caudoviricetes
- Genus: Fromanvirus
- Species: Fromanvirus Packman

Species of virus

Mycobacterium virus Packman is a bacteriophage known to infect bacterial species of the genus Mycobacterium.
