= Azadithiolate cofactor =

An azadithiolate cofactor is an anion with the formula NH(CH_{2}S)_{2}^{2−}. It is used as a cofactor in the [FeFe] hydrogenases, bacterial enzymes responsible for the reversible reduction of 2 H^{+} to H_{2}. As a cofactor, the two thiolate functional groups are bound to each of the two irons in the active site of the enzyme in a bridging fashion. The amine functional group serves as an acid/base to transfer H^{+} from the solution to the active site. The proton transfer function of this cofactor is of great importance to the activity of the hydrogenase enzyme, as H_{2} evolution will not occur if the amine is not present.
