= Mycobacterium virus D29 =

Bacteriophage D29

Virus classification
- (unranked): Virus
- Realm: Duplodnaviria
- Kingdom: Heunggongvirae
- Phylum: Uroviricota
- Class: Caudoviricetes
- Genus: Fromanvirus
- Species: Fromanvirus D29

Synonyms
- Mycobacterium virus D29

Species of virus

Mycobacterium virus D29 (D29) is a cluster A mycobacteriophage. It was discovered in 1954 by S. Froman.

== Viral classification ==
Mycobacterium virus D29 is a Caudoviricetes virus belonging to the Fromanvirus genus.

== Tropism ==
D29 can infect a large variety of mycobacteria.

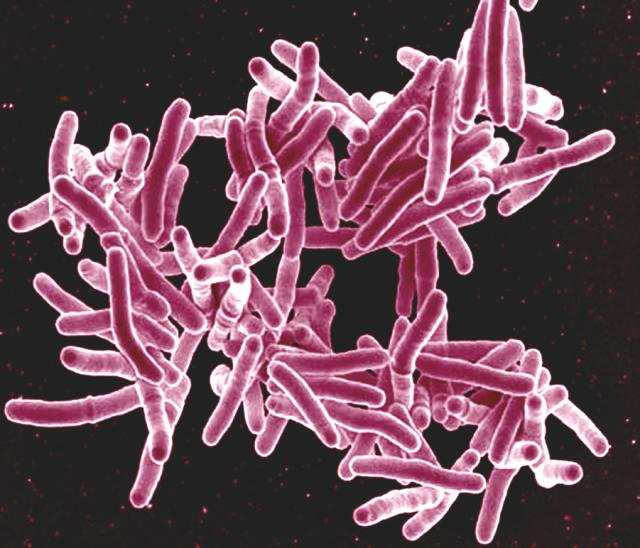
M. tuberculosis: a deadly pathogen that D29 is able to infect
