= Enzyme mimic =

Enzyme mimic (or Artificial enzyme) is a branch of biomimetic chemistry, which aims at imitating the function of natural enzymes. An enzyme mimic is a small molecule complex that models the molecular structure, spectroscopic properties, or reactivity of an enzyme, sometimes called bioinspired complexes.

== Overview ==
Enzymes are biological catalysts: biopolymers that catalyze a reaction. Although a small number of natural enzymes are built from RNA–termed Ribozymes–most enzymes are proteins. Like any other protein, an enzyme is an amino acid polymer with added cofactors and other post-translational modifications. Often, most of the amino acid polymer is indirectly involved with the enzymes function, perhaps providing ancillary structure or connectivity, indirect activity regulation, or molecular identification of the enzyme. As a result, most enzymes are large molecules weighing many kilodaltons. This bulk can obscure various investigative techniques such as NMR, EPR, electrochemistry, crystallography, among others. It is standard practice to compare spectroscopic data from enzymes to similar spectroscopic data derived from better characterized small molecules. In this way, the understanding of metalloenzymes and other metalloproteins have developed. In many cases, the small molecule analogs were created for other reasons; however, it has been increasingly common for groups to intentionally make small molecule analogs also known as enzyme mimics. These enzyme mimics are prime examples of bioinorganic chemistry.

== Motivation ==
Most enzyme mimic studies are motivated by a combination of factors, including factors that are unrelated to the enzyme. Several of the factors that are related to the enzyme are listed below.

Defining the active site structure. A number of important active sites are still poorly defined. This includes the oxygen evolving complex and nitrogenase. In an effort to understand these enzymes, small molecule analogs are created and compared to the data which exists for the proteins.

Understanding the active site function. The structure of some enzymes are very well characterized, however, the function of some component of the active site is poorly understood. This is often investigated through site-directed mutagenesis. In addition, the synthesis of a model complex can suggest the function of various components.

Reproducing the enzymes function. A number of enzymes are an interest since they catalyze a reaction chemist find challenging. These reactions include the partial oxidation of a hydrocarbon by methane monooxygenase (MMO) or the oxidation and production of hydrogen by hydrogenase. "Functional" enzyme mimics or bioinspired catalysts are designed with characteristics of the enzyme in hopes of reproducing the enzymes functionality.

== Significant examples ==
This list is extremely abbreviated in terms of the enzymes mimicked and the primary investigators working on each enzyme mimic.

Richard Holm's work on mimics of nitrogenase and creation of iron sulfur clusters.

Stephen Lippard's work on MMO.

Thomas Rauchfuss's, Marcetta Darensbourg's and Christopher Pickett's work on Hydrogenase mimics.

Harry Gray's work with porphyrins complexes.

Ronald Breslow and Larry E. Overman coined the term of "artificial enzyme".
