= Mycobacterium virus L5 =

Virus classification
- (unranked): Virus
- Realm: Duplodnaviria
- Kingdom: Heunggongvirae
- Phylum: Uroviricota
- Class: Caudoviricetes
- Genus: Fromanvirus
- Species: Fromanvirus L5

Species of virus

Mycobacterium virus L5 is a bacteriophage known to infect bacterial species of the genus Mycobacterium, including Mycobacterium smegmatis and Mycobacterium tuberculosis. The viral effect on these species plays an important role in vaccine development and research on Mycobacteria pathogenic properties.
