= Hydrogenase mimic =

A hydrogenase mimic or bio-mimetic is an enzyme mimic of hydrogenases.

== Bio-mimetic compounds inspired in hydrogenases ==
One of the more interesting applications of hydrogenases is to produce hydrogen, due its capacity to catalyze its redox reaction:

2 H^{+} + 2 e^{−} → H_{2}

In the field of hydrogen production, the incorporation of chemical compounds in electrochemical devices to produce molecular hydrogen has been a topic of huge interest in the recent years due to the possibility of using hydrogen as a replacement of the fossil fuels as an energetic carrier. This approach of using materials inspired by natural models to do the same function as their natural counterparts is called bio-mimetic approach. Nowadays this approach has received a big impulse due to the availability of high-resolution crystal structures of several hydrogenases obtained with different techniques. The technical details of these hydrogenases are stored in electronic databases at disposition to who may be interested.

This information has allowed scientists to determine the important parts of the enzyme necessary to catalyze the reaction and determine the pathway of the reaction in a very detailed way. Which allow to have a very good comprehension of what is necessary to catalyze the same reaction using artificial components.

=== Examples of bio-mimetic compounds inspired in hydrogenase ===
Several studies have demonstrated the possibility to develop chemical cells inspired by biological models to produce molecular hydrogen, for example: Selvaggi et al. explored the possibility to use energy captured by the PSII, developing for that goal, an organic-inorganic hybrid system replacing the PSII protein complex by microspheres of TiO_{2} a photo-inducible compound. In order to get the hydrogen production, the TiO_{2} microspheres were covered with hydrogenases extracted from the marine thermophile Pyrococcus furiosus, in that way the energy of the light was captured by the TiO_{2} microspheres and used to generate protons and electrons from water with the subsequent production of 29 μmol de H_{2} hour^{−1}.

The obtained results from immobilization of hydrogenases on the surface of electrodes have demonstrated the viability of incorporating these enzymes in electrochemical cells, due to their ability to produce gaseous hydrogen through a redox reaction. (Hallenbeck and Benemann). This opens the possibility of using biomimetic compounds in electrodes to generate hydrogen.

Until the present day several bio-mimetic compounds have been developed: Collman et al. produced ruthenium porphyrins, furthermore of the bio-mimetic compounds published by the research teams of Rauchfuss, Darensbourg and Pickett (in Artero and Fontecave) who developed bio-mimetic compounds of the [Fe] hydrogenase. More recently Manor and Rauchfuss presented a very interesting mimic compound based in the [NiFe] hydrogenase with bidirectional properties, this compound has the characteristic that it carries two borane protected cyanide ligands at the iron atom. Some works about bio-mimetic compounds of hydrogenases are summarized in table 1.

| Biomimetic compound | Hydrogen production | Electron donor | Reference |
| Bis(thiolate)-bridged diiron ([2Fe_{2}S]) | 0.22 (30%) | | Kluwer et al. |
| 2-aza-1,3-dithiol Bridged Fe-dimer complexes | | | Sun et al. |
| [MnRe(CO)_{6}(m-S2CPR_{3})] | | | Zhao et al. |
| Polymer (Poly-{Fe_{2}}) functionalized with {Fe_{2}(CO)_{6}} | | | Liu et al. |
| Diiron dithiolate complexes with 3,7-diacetyl-1,3,7-triaza-5 phosphabicyclo[3.3.1]nonane ligand(s) | | | Na et al. |
| Enzyme electrodes, [NiFe] hydrogenases | 9-30 (nmol min^{−1}) | methyl viologen or water | Morozov et al. |
| Hydrogenase in a two-compartment proton-exchange-membrane (PEM) | | Sodium dithionite (SD) | Oh et al. |
| Pt-clusters deposited on the interior of a heat shock protein cage architecture | 268 H_{2}/Pt/min, | methyl viologen | Varpness. et al. |
| Hydrogenase immobilization, on porous pyrolytic carbon paper (PCP) and packed graphite columns (PGC) | | | Johnston et al. |
| Fe_{2}(CO)_{6}(l-ADT) (ADT = azadithiolate) | | | Constable et al. |
| [Fe_{2}(CO)_{6}(H_{3}COCH(CH_{2}S)_{2})] and [Fe_{2}(CO)_{6}(HOC(CH_{3})(CH_{2}S)_{2})]. | | | Apfel et al. |
| Dithiolate-bridged hexacarbonyldiiron complex | | | Goff et al. |
| m-(SCH(CH_{3})CH_{2}S)eFe2(CO)6, m-(SCH(CH_{3})CH(CH_{3})S)eFe_{2}(CO)_{6}, m-(SCH_{2}CH(CH_{2}OH)S)eFe_{2}(CO)_{6}, | | | Donovan et al. |
| A series of mononuclear NiII and binuclear NiIINiII macrocyclic complexes: [NiLi(H_{2}O)] 2H_{2}O | | | Martin et al. |
| [Fe_{2}(CO)_{3}(l-pdt){l,g^{2}-Ph_{2}PCH_{2}CH_{2}P(Ph)CH_{2}CH_{2}PPh_{2}}] | | | Hogarth and Richards |
| Di-iron model complexes (l-pdt)Fe_{2}(CO)_{5}L with L = pyridine ligands, e.g. py (A), etpy (B), btpy (C), | | | Zhang et al. |

Table 1. Bio-mimetic compounds of hydrogenases

However, obtaining bio-mimetic compounds able to hydrogen production on an industrial scale still is elusive. For that reason, the research of this topic is a hot spot in science which has taken the efforts of researchers around the world. Recently a review of the works done in bio-mimetic compounds was published by Schilter et al.. Showing that some studies have got promising results in bio-mimetic compounds synthesized in laboratory.

=== Molecular modeling of bio-mimetic compounds of hydrogenases assisted with software ===
Recently the possibility of study such compounds using molecular modeling assisted by informatic software has opened new possibilities in the study of the redox reaction of biomimetic compounds. For example, using "Density Functional Theory" (DFT) computer modeling made it possible to propose a pathway for H_{2} binding and splitting on the catalytic center of a hydrogenase active site model (Greco). Other example of the application of computational modeling in the study of hydrogenases is the work done by Breglia et al., whose results shows the chemical pathway of how oxygen inhibited the redox reaction of [NiFe] hydrogenases.

=== Bio-mimetic compounds inspired in [Fe] hydrogenases ===
The Fe-only hydrogenases are particularly common enzymes for synthetic organometallic chemists to mimic. This interest is motivated by the inclusion of high field ligands like cyano and CO (metal carbonyl) in the first coordination sphere of the pertinent di-iron cluster. Free cyano and carbonyl ligands are toxic to many biological systems. So, their inclusion in this system suggests they play pivotal roles. These high field ligands may ensure the iron centers at the active site remain in a low spin state throughout the catalytic cycle. In addition, there is bridging dithiolate between the two iron centers. This dithiolate has a three atom backbone in which the identity of the central atom is still undetermined; it models crystallographically as a CH_{2}, NH or O group. There is reason to believe that this central atom is an amine which functions as a Lewis base. This amine combined with Lewis acidic iron centers makes the enzyme a bifunctional catalyst which can split hydrogen between a proton acceptor and a hydride acceptor or produce hydrogen from a proton and hydride.

Since none of the ligands on the iron centers are part of the enzyme's amino acid backbone, they can not be investigated through site-directed mutagenesis, but enzyme mimicry is a feasible approach.

=== Breadth ===
Many elegant structural mimics have been synthesized reproducing the atomic content and connectivity of the active site. The work by Pickett is a prime example of this field. The catalytic activity of these mimics do not however compare to the native enzyme. In contrast, functional mimics, also known as bio-inspired catalysts, aim to reproduce only the functional features of an enzyme often through the use of different atomic content and connectivity from that found in the native enzymes. Functional mimics have made advances in the reactive chemistry and have implications on the mechanistic activity of the enzyme as well as acting as catalysts in their own right.
