= Fromanvirus =

Virus classification
- (unranked): Virus
- Realm: Duplodnaviria
- Kingdom: Heunggongvirae
- Phylum: Uroviricota
- Class: Caudoviricetes
- Genus: Fromanvirus

Genus of viruses

Fromanvirus (synonyms L5-like viruses, L5-like phages, L5likevirus) is a genus of viruses in the class Caudoviricetes, unassigned to a family. Bacteria serve as natural hosts, with transmission achieved through passive diffusion. There are 39 species in this genus.

== Taxonomy ==
The following species are recognized:

- Fromanvirus alma
- Fromanvirus astro
- Fromanvirus bethlehem
- Fromanvirus billknuckles
- Fromanvirus bpbiebs31
- Fromanvirus bruns
- Fromanvirus Bxb1
- Fromanvirus Che12
- Fromanvirus D29
- Fromanvirus doom
- Fromanvirus euphoria
- Fromanvirus george
- Fromanvirus goose
- Fromanvirus jasper
- Fromanvirus JC27
- Fromanvirus KBG
- Fromanvirus kssjeb
- Fromanvirus kugel
- Fromanvirus L5
- Fromanvirus lesedi
- Fromanvirus lockley
- Fromanvirus marcell
- Fromanvirus mrgordo
- Fromanvirus museum
- Fromanvirus nepal
- Fromanvirus packman
- Fromanvirus perseus
- Fromanvirus rebeuca
- Fromanvirus redrock
- Fromanvirus ridgecb
- Fromanvirus saintus
- Fromanvirus skipole
- Fromanvirus solon
- Fromanvirus switzer
- Fromanvirus SWU1
- Fromanvirus trixie
- Fromanvirus twister
- Fromanvirus U2
- Fromanvirus violet

== Structure ==
Fromanviruses are nonenveloped, with a head and tail. The icosahedral head is about 60 nm in diameter, with covalently linked capsid proteins. The tail is long and flexible, at about 135 nm long, 8 nm wide, and has a terminal knob with one short tail fiber.

| Genus | Structure | Symmetry | Capsid | Genomic arrangement | Genomic segmentation |
|---|---|---|---|---|---|
| Fromanvirus | Head-Tail | T=7 | Non-enveloped | Linear | Monopartite |

== Genome ==
Bxb1, D29, and L5 and have been fully sequenced. They range between 49k and 53k nucleotides, with 79 to 90 proteins. Their complete genomes, and the genomes of many other species and unclassified viruses, are available via NCBI.

== Life cycle ==
The virus attaches to the host cell's adhesion receptors using its terminal fiber, and ejects the viral DNA into the host cytoplasm via long flexible tail ejection system. Viral replication is cytoplasmic. Replication follows the replicative transposition model. DNA-templated transcription is the method of transcription. Once the viral genes have been replicated, the procapsid is assembled and packed. The tail is then assembled and the mature virions are released via lysis. Bacteria serve as the natural host. Transmission routes are passive diffusion.

| Genus | Host details | Tissue tropism | Entry details | Release details | Replication site | Assembly site | Transmission |
|---|---|---|---|---|---|---|---|
| Fromanvirus | Bacteria | None | Injection | Lysis | Cytoplasm | Cytoplasm | Passive diffusion |

== History ==
According to ICTV's 1996 report, the genus L5likevirus was first accepted under the name L5-like phages, assigned only to family Siphoviridae. The whole family was moved to the newly created order Caudovirales in 1998, and the genus was renamed to L5-like viruses in ICTV's seventh report in 1999. In 2012, the genus was renamed again, this time to L5likevirus. The genus was later renamed to Fromanvirus.
