= Hydrogenase (NAD+, ferredoxin) =

Hydrogenase (NAD^{+}, ferredoxin)

Identifiers
- EC no.: 1.12.1.4

Databases
- IntEnz: IntEnz view
- BRENDA: BRENDA entry
- ExPASy: NiceZyme view
- KEGG: KEGG entry
- MetaCyc: metabolic pathway
- PRIAM: profile
- PDB structures: RCSB PDB PDBe PDBsum
Search
- PMC: articles
- PubMed: articles
- NCBI: proteins

Hydrogenase (NAD+, ferredoxin) (EC 1.12.1.4, bifurcating [FeFe] hydrogenase) is an enzyme with systematic name hydrogen:NAD^{+}, ferredoxin oxidoreductase. This enzyme catalyses the following chemical reaction

2 H_{2} + NAD^{+} + 2 oxidized ferredoxin $\rightleftharpoons$ 5 H^{+} + NADH + 2 reduced ferredoxin

The enzyme from Thermotoga maritima contains a [Fe-Fe] cluster (H-cluster) and iron-sulfur clusters. I
