= Hydrogen:quinone oxidoreductase =

hydrogen:quinone oxidoreductase

Identifiers
- EC no.: 1.12.5.1
- CAS no.: 147097-29-8

Databases
- IntEnz: IntEnz view
- BRENDA: BRENDA entry
- ExPASy: NiceZyme view
- KEGG: KEGG entry
- MetaCyc: metabolic pathway
- PRIAM: profile
- PDB structures: RCSB PDB PDBe PDBsum
- Gene Ontology: AmiGO / QuickGO
Search
- PMC: articles
- PubMed: articles
- NCBI: proteins

In enzymology, a hydrogen:quinone oxidoreductase (EC 1.12.5.1) is an enzyme that catalyzes the chemical reaction

H_{2} + quinone $\rightleftharpoons$ quinol

Thus, the two substrates of this enzyme are H_{2} and quinone, whereas its product is quinol. The quinone can be menaquinone, ubiquinone, demethylmenaquinone or methionaquinone.

This enzyme belongs to the family of oxidoreductases, specifically those acting on hydrogen as donor with a quinone or similar compound as acceptor. The systematic name of this enzyme class is hydrogen:quinone oxidoreductase. Other names in common use include hydrogen-ubiquinone oxidoreductase, hydrogen:menaquinone oxidoreductase, membrane-bound hydrogenase, and quinone-reactive Ni/Fe-hydrogenase.
