= Hydrogen dehydrogenase =

hydrogen dehydrogenase

Identifiers
- EC no.: 1.12.1.2
- CAS no.: 9027-05-8

Databases
- BRENDA: enzyme data
- ExPASy: NiceZyme view
- KEGG: enzyme entry
- MetaCyc: metabolic pathway
- Rhea: reactions
- PDB structures: RCSB PDB PDBe PDBsum
- Gene Ontology: AmiGO / QuickGO
Search
- PMC: articles
- PubMed: articles
- NCBI: proteins

In enzymology, a hydrogen dehydrogenase (EC 1.12.1.2) is an enzyme that catalyzes the chemical reaction

H_{2} + NAD^{+} $\rightleftharpoons$ H^{+} + NADH

Thus, the two substrates of this enzyme are H_{2} and NAD^{+}, whereas its two products are H^{+} and NADH.

This enzyme belongs to the family of oxidoreductases, specifically those acting on hydrogen as donor with NAD+ or NADP+ as acceptor. The systematic name of this enzyme class is hydrogen:NAD+ oxidoreductase. Other names in common use include H2:NAD+ oxidoreductase, NAD+-linked hydrogenase, bidirectional hydrogenase, and hydrogenase. This enzyme participates in glyoxylate and dicarboxylate metabolism and methane metabolism. It has 6 cofactors: FAD, Iron, FMN, Flavin, Nickel, and Iron-sulfur.
