= Ferredoxin hydrogenase =

Class of enzymes

ferredoxin hydrogenase
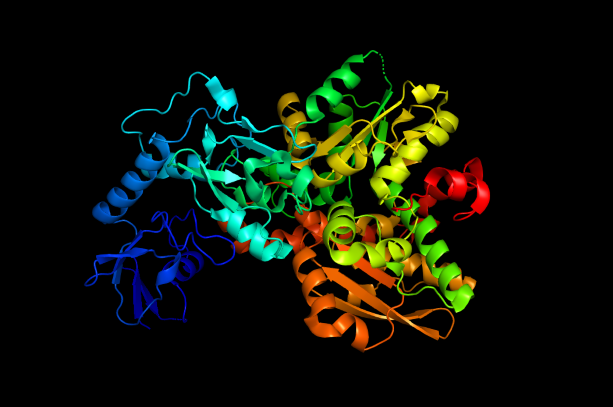
- A ribbon diagram of a ferredoxin hydrogenase

Identifiers
- EC no.: 1.12.7.2
- CAS no.: 9080-02-8

Databases
- BRENDA: enzyme data
- ExPASy: NiceZyme view
- KEGG: enzyme entry
- MetaCyc: metabolic pathway
- Rhea: reactions
- PDB structures: RCSB PDB PDBe PDBsum
- Gene Ontology: AmiGO / QuickGO
Search
- PMC: articles
- PubMed: articles
- NCBI: proteins

In enzymology, ferredoxin hydrogenase (EC 1.12.7.2), also referred to as [Fe-Fe] hydrogenase, H2 oxidizing hydrogenase, H2 producing hydrogenase, bidirectional hydrogenase, hydrogenase (ferredoxin), hydrogenlyase, and uptake hydrogenase, is a type of hydrogenase found in Clostridium pasteurianum, Clostridium acetobutylicum, Chlamydomonas reinhardtii, and other organisms. The systematic name of this enzyme is hydrogen:ferredoxin oxidoreductase

Ferredoxin hydrogenase belongs to the family of oxidoreductases, specifically those acting on hydrogen as donor, with an iron–sulfur protein such as ferredoxin as acceptor. Ferredoxin hydrogenase has an active metallocluster site referred to as an "H-cluster" or "H domain" that is involved in the inter-conversion of protons (H^{+}) and electrons with hydrogen gas (H_{2}).

== Enzyme reaction and mechanism ==
Ferredoxin hydrogenase catalyzes the following reversible reaction:

H_{2} + 2 oxidized ferredoxin $\rightleftharpoons$ 2 reduced ferredoxin + 2 H^{+}

The exact mechanism by which this reaction occurs is still not entirely known; however, several intermediates have been identified in steady-state conditions. A proposed mechanism for the catalyzed reaction by ferredoxin hydrogenase is:

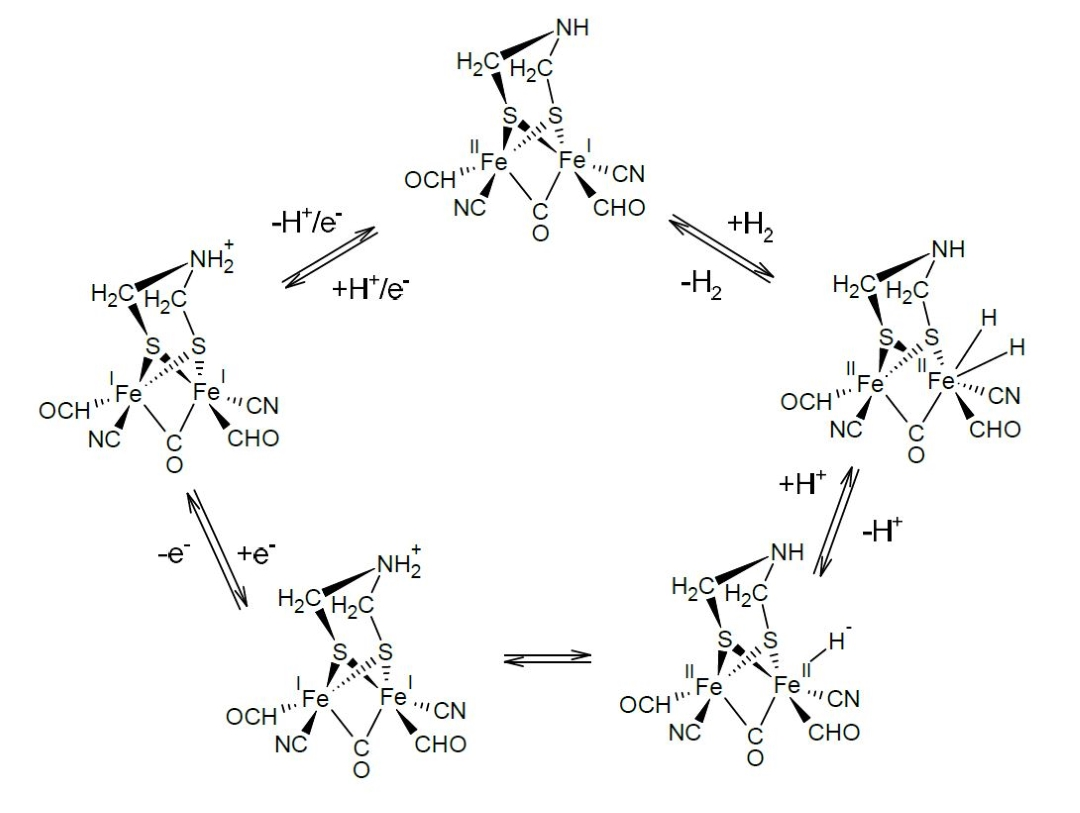

The two substrates of this enzyme are H_{2} and oxidized ferredoxin, whereas its two products are reduced ferredoxin and H^{+}. During the hydrogen gas turnover, the H-cluster undergoes a series of redox transitions as protons are translocated. The reaction rate is dependent on environmental pH and sees an activity increase in environments between 7–9 pH. Accessory clusters allow for the enzyme to retain full enzyme activity at potentials around and higher than the equilibrium potential. However, the accessory clusters are not as effective at extremely low potentials.

== Enzyme structure ==
The reaction occurs in the [2Fe] moiety of the active H cluster site, which also includes a [4Fe4S] cluster covalently bonded via a cysteinyl thiolate. An additional accessory site known as the F-domain, which contains four Fe-S clusters, is known as the main gate for electron transfer to and from the catalytic site. The [2Fe] sub-site is coordinated by several CO and CN ligands and an azadithiolate bridge that allows for proton shuttling. The oxidized state of the sub-site, abbreviated as Hox, includes a paramagnetic, mixed-valence [Fe(I)Fe(II)] moiety and a diamagnetic, oxidized [4Fe4S]^{2+} cluster. The single electron reduction of Hox yields two protomers that differ in the localization of the added electron and proton. The addition of the second electron results in the [Fe(I)Fe(II)]-[4Fe4S]^{+} configuration and a protonated azadithiolate bridge.

== Biological function ==
Hydrogenases are found in prokaryotes and lower (unicellular) eukaryotes. This broad category of metalloenzymes can be divided into [NiFe], [FeFe], and [Fe] variants based on the transition metals found in their active sites. However, the hydrogen gas oxidation and proton reduction activities varies greatly among the variants and even within their own subcategories. Ferredoxin hydrogenase participates in glyoxylate and dicarboxylate metabolism and methane metabolism. It has 3 cofactors: iron, Sulfur, and Nickel.

Ferredoxin hydrogenase found in the green algae Chlamydomonas reinhardtii use supplied electrons from photosystem I to reduce protons into hydrogen gas. This electron supply transfer is possible through photosystem I interactions with photosynthetic electron transfer ferredoxin (PetF). The inter-conversion of protons and electrons with hydrogen gas allow organisms to modulate energy input and output, adjust organelle redox potential, and transduce chemical signals.

== Industrial significance ==
Hydrogen gas is a potential candidate for the partial replacement of fossil fuels as a clean energy carrier in fuel cells. However, because of the gas's weight, it often escapes the Earth's atmosphere into space, making it a scarce resource on Earth.

The hydrogen photo-production in green algae, catalyzed by ferredoxin hydrogenase, is a potential source of hydrogen gas. Unfortunately, the inefficiency of the reaction and enzyme as whole to produce hydrogen places a barrier on the viability of this reaction on an industrial scale. In addition, ferredoxin hydrogenase is sensitive to oxygen; the typical half life for the enzyme under aerobic conditions is on the scale of seconds, rendering it difficult to cultivate and manage commercially.
