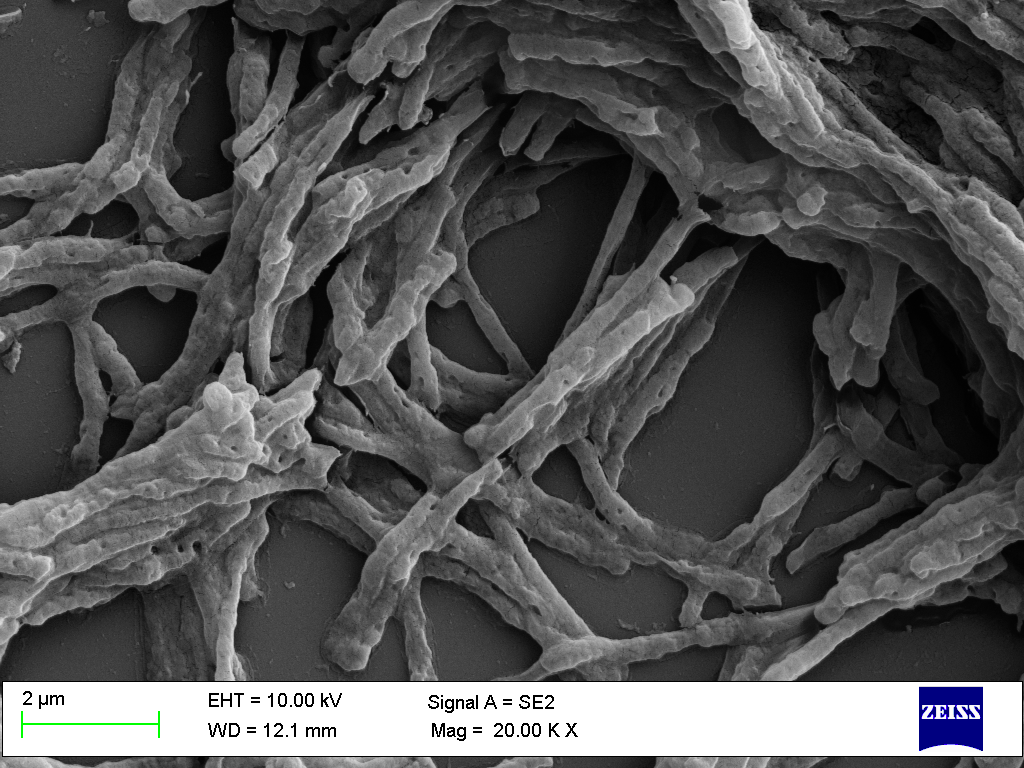

Scientific classification
- Domain: Bacteria
- Kingdom: Bacillati
- Phylum: Actinomycetota
- Class: Actinomycetes
- Order: Mycobacteriales
- Family: Mycobacteriaceae
- Genus: Mycobacterium
- Species: M. smegmatis

Binomial name
- Mycobacterium smegmatis (Trevisan 1889); Lehmann & Neumann 1899

= Mycobacterium smegmatis =

Species of bacterium

Mycobacterium smegmatis is an acid-fast bacterial species in the phylum Actinomycetota and the genus Mycobacterium. It is 3.0 to 5.0 μm long with a bacillus shape and can be stained by Ziehl–Neelsen method and the auramine-rhodamine fluorescent method. It was first reported in November 1884, who found a bacillus with the staining appearance of tubercle bacilli in syphilitic chancres. Subsequent to this, Alvarez and Tavel found organisms similar to that described by Lustgarten also in normal genital secretions (smegma). This organism was later named M. smegmatis.

Some species of the genus Mycobacterium have recently been renamed to Mycolicibacterium, so that M. smegmatis is now Mycolicibacterium smegmatis.

M. smegmatis, which was previously considered a nonmotile organism, uses a sliding mechanism that allows it to move around its environment. Henrichsen defines it as, "a kind of surface translocation produced by the expansive forces in a growing culture in combination with special surface properties of the cells resulting in reduced friction between cell and substrate". Essentially, the bacteria form a single-layered sheet and are able to move slowly together without the use of any extracellular structures, like flagella or pili. Although it hasn't been determined exactly how this mechanism works, the surface properties of the unique cell wall of M. smegmatis have been found to play a role. For example, this sliding ability is correlated with the presence of glycopeptidolipids (GPLs) on the outermost part of the cell wall. GPLs are amphiphilic molecules that could potentially decrease surface interactions or create a conditioning film that allows movement. Although the exact role of GPLs in sliding is not known, without them M. smegmatis does not have the ability to translocate.

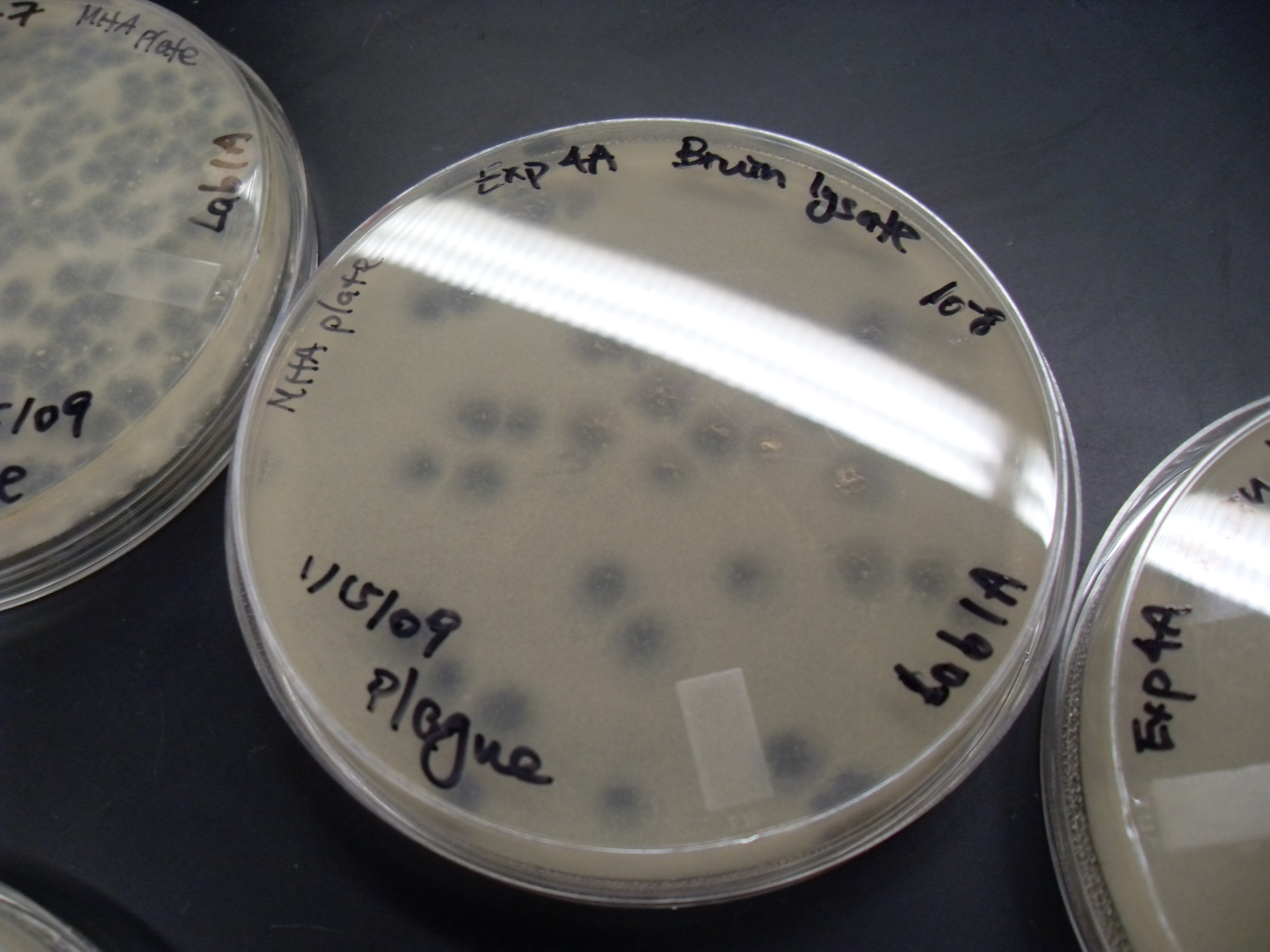
Plaques from a virus isolated from a compost heap near UCLA. The bacterium is M. smegmatis

== Virulence ==
M. smegmatis is generally considered a non-pathogenic microorganism; however, in some very rare cases, it may cause disease.

== Genetics and genomics ==
The genomes of multiple strains of M. smegmatis have been sequenced by TIGR and other laboratories, including the "wild-type" (mc^{2} 155) and some antibiotic-resistant strains (4XR1/R2). The genome of strain mc^{2}155 is ~6,9 Mbp long and encodes ~6400 proteins which is relatively large for bacteria (for comparison, the genome of E. coli encodes about 4000 proteins).

This species shares more than 2000 homologous genes with M. tuberculosis and thus is a good model organism to study mycobacteria in general and the highly pathogenic M. tuberculosis in particular; however, only 12 of the 19 virulence genes in M. tuberculosis have homologues in M. smegmatis.

The discovery of plasmids, phages, and mobile genetic elements has enabled the construction of dedicated gene-inactivation and gene reporter systems. The M. smegmatis mc^{2}155 strain is hypertransformable, and is now the work-horse of mycobacterial genetics.

=== Transformation ===
Transformation is a process by which a bacterial cell takes up DNA that had been released by another cell into the surrounding medium, and then incorporates that DNA into its own genome by homologous recombination (see Transformation (genetics)). Strains of M. smegmatis that have particularly efficient DNA repair machinery, as indicated by their greater resistance to the DNA damaging effects of agents such as UV and mitomycin C, proved to be the most capable of undergoing transformation. This suggests that transformation in M. smegmatis is a DNA repair process, presumably a recombinational repair process, as it is in other bacterial species.

=== Conjugation ===
Conjugal DNA transfer in M. smegmatis requires stable and extended contact between a donor and a recipient strain, is DNase resistant, and the transferred DNA is incorporated into the recipient's chromosome by homologous recombination. However, in contrast to the well-known E. coli Hfr conjugation system, in M. smegmatis all regions of the chromosome are transferred with comparable efficiencies and mycobacterial conjugation is chromosome, rather than plasmid based. Gray et al. reported substantial blending of the parental genomes resulting from conjugation and referred to this blending as reminiscent of that seen in the meiotic products of sexual reproduction (see Origin of sexual reproduction).

== DNA repair ==
Mycobacterium smegmatis relies on DNA repair pathways to resist DNA damage. Double-strand breaks are especially threatening to bacterial viability. M. smegmatis has three options for repairing double-strand breaks; homologous recombination (HR), non-homologous end joining (NHEJ), and single-strand annealing (SSA). The HR pathway of M. smegmatis is the major determinant of resistance to ionizing radiation and oxidative DNA damage. This pathway involves exchange of information between a damaged chromosome and another homologous chromosome in the same cell. It depends on the RecA protein that catalyzes strand exchange and the ADN protein that acts as a presynaptic nuclease. HR is an accurate repair process and is the preferred pathway during logarithmic growth.

The NHEJ pathway for repairing double-strand breaks involves the rejoining of the broken ends. It does not depend on a second homologous chromosome. This pathway requires the Ku protein and a specialized poly-functional ATP-dependent DNA ligase (ligase D). NHEJ is efficient but inaccurate. Sealing of blunt DNA ends within a functional gene sequence occurs with a mutation frequency of about 50%. NHEJ is the preferred pathway during stationary phase, and it protects M. smegmatis against the harmful effects of desiccation.

SSA is employed as a repair pathway when a double-strand break arises between direct repeat sequences in DNA. SSA involves single-strand resection, annealing of the repeats, flap removal, gap filling and ligation. In M. smegmatis the SSA pathway depends on the RecBCD helicase-nuclease.

== Antibiotic resistance ==
While mycobacterial resistance is often attributed to random mutations during rapid division, recent studies using M. smegmatis as a model demonstrate that exposure to first- and second-line antitubercular drugs—including isoniazid, rifampicin, and bedaquiline—does not significantly increase the mutation rate. Instead, mycobacteria maintain high genomic stability through robust, drug-triggered DNA-repair mechanisms, suggesting that initial survival under antibiotic pressure is driven by non-genetic phenotypic tolerance and metabolic adaptation rather than immediate microevolution.

== Applications ==
=== Use in research ===
Mycobacterium smegmatis is useful for the research analysis of other Mycobacteria species in laboratory experiments. M. smegmatis is commonly used in work on the Mycobacterium genus due to it being a "fast grower" and non-pathogenic. M. smegmatis is a simple model that is easy to work with, i.e., with a fast doubling time and only requires a biosafety level 1 laboratory. The time and heavy infrastructure needed to work with pathogenic species prompted researchers to use M. smegmatis as a model for mycobacterial species.

Mycobacterium smegmatis shares the same peculiar cell wall structure of M. tuberculosis and other mycobacterial species. It is also capable of oxidizing carbon monoxide aerobically, as is M. tuberculosis.

Bacterial secretion systems are specialized protein complexes and pathways that allow bacterial pathogens to secrete proteins across their cell membranes and, ultimately, to host cells. These effector proteins are important virulence factors, which allow the pathogen to survive inside of the host. There are many different kinds of specific secretion systems, and M. tuberculosis has an Snm (secretion in mycobacteria) protein secretion system, now called the ESX secretion system. Although the ESX secretion system is a key in determining M. tuberculosis virulence, all mycobacteria have genes encoding the components of this system. This area of the genome is referred to as the RD1 locus. M. smegmatis is commonly used to study ESX secretion because of its genetic similarities and analogous function to M. tuberculosis, as well as ease of growing in the lab. One example of how this can be applied in research is the identification of gene products required for ESX secretion. By knocking out genes in the RD1 locus of M. smegmatis and testing efficiency of ESX secretion before and after gene knockout, specific genes can be identified as necessary for ESX secretion. These findings can be applied to the ESX secretion system of M. tuberculosis.

Mycobacterium smegmatis is readily cultivatable in most synthetic or complex laboratory media, where it can form visible colonies in 3–5 days. These properties make it a very attractive model organism for M. tuberculosis and other mycobacterial pathogens. M. smegmatis mc^{2}155 is also used for the cultivation of mycobacteriophage.

=== Production of electricity ===
Like many other bacteria, M. smegmatis is known to use the trace levels of hydrogen in the atmosphere as an energy source. In 2023, researchers reported extracting from M. smegmatis a [NiFe]-hydrogenase called Huc, which is highly efficient at oxidizing hydrogen gas—and thus creating an electric current—while also being insensitive to the presence of oxygen, which typically obstructs catalysis. This discovery offers significant potential for green energy.
