= Hydrogenase (acceptor) =

Class of enzymes

Identifiers
- EC no.: 1.12.99.6
- CAS no.: 9027-05-8

Databases
- IntEnz: IntEnz view
- BRENDA: BRENDA entry
- ExPASy: NiceZyme view
- KEGG: KEGG entry
- MetaCyc: metabolic pathway
- PRIAM: profile
- PDB structures: RCSB PDB PDBe PDBsum
Search
- PMC: articles
- PubMed: articles
- NCBI: proteins

In enzymology, a hydrogenase (acceptor) (EC 1.12.99.6) is an enzyme that catalyzes the chemical reaction

H_{2} + A $\rightleftharpoons$ AH_{2}

Thus, the two substrates of this enzyme are H_{2} and A, whereas its product is AH_{2}.

This enzyme belongs to the family of oxidoreductases, specifically those acting on hydrogen as donor with other acceptors. The systematic name of this enzyme class is hydrogen:acceptor oxidoreductase. Other names in common use include H2 producing hydrogenase[ambiguous], hydrogen-lyase[ambiguous], hydrogenlyase[ambiguous], uptake hydrogenase[ambiguous], and hydrogen:(acceptor) oxidoreductase.
