= Cytokinin signaling and response regulator protein =

A cytokinin signaling and response regulator protein is a plant protein that is involved in a two step cytokinin signaling and response regulation pathway.

The current model of cytokinin signaling and response regulation shows that it works as a multi-step phosphorelay two-component signaling system. This type of system is similar to two-component signaling systems in bacteria. The cytokinin signaling pathway consists of sensor kinases, histidine phosphotransfer proteins, and response regulators. In this system, cytokinin sensor kinases are activated by the presence of cytokinins. The sensor kinase then autophosphorylates, transferring a phosphate from its kinase domain to its receiver domain. The phosphate is then transferred to a histidine phosphotransfer protein which then phosphorylates a response regulator. The response regulators can then serve as positive or negative regulators of the signaling mechanism and affect gene expression within the plant cells. This system is a called a two-step system because it involves two steps to transfer the phosphate to the final target, the response regulators. Cytokinin cause a rapid increase in the expression of response regulator genes Cytokinins are a class of phytohormones that promote cell division in plants. Cytokinins participate in short and long-distance signaling and are transported for this signaling through the xylem of plants. Cytokinins control the differentiation of meristem cells in plant development, particularly in shoots and roots where plants undergo growth. Cytokinins act in a restricted region of the root meristem, and their signaling and regulation of genes occurs through a multi-step phosphorelay mediate by cytokinin histidine sensor kinases, histidine phosphotransfer proteins, and cytokinin response regulator proteins.

== Cytokinin sensor kinases ==
Cytokinin sensor kinases are the initial sensors that detect and are bound by cytokinins. Research with maize and Arabidopsis thaliana suggest that some cytokinin sensor kinases bind multiple types of cytokinins while other cytokinin sensor kinases are specific for distinct cytokinins.

AHK4, a cytokinin histidine kinase in Arabidopsis thaliana, is a cytokinin sensor that allows binding of multiple types of cytokinins. AHK4 has been shown, through three-dimensional modeling, to completely surround bound cytokinin in the binding pocket.

AHK2 and AHK3 have been shown to be critically involved in drought tolerance. These receptors activate dehydration tolerance response within one hour of dehydration and continue activation through eight hours.

== Histidine phosphotransfer proteins ==
Histidine phosphotransfer proteins transfer the phosphate in the multistep phosphorelay signaling pathway from cytokinin sensor kinases to their final target, cytokinin response regulators.

In Arabidopsis thaliana, most histidine phosphotransfer proteins are redundant, positive regulators in cytokinin signaling. Most of the Arabidopsis thaliana histidine phosphotransfer proteins have functional overlap and affect many aspects of plant development. AHP4, however, might play a negative role in cytokinin responses.

== Cytokinin response regulators ==
Cytokinin response regulators proteins are the final target of the two-step phosphorelay. These response regulators fall into three known classes: type A response regulators, type B response regulators, and type C response regulators.

=== Type A ===
Type A cytokinin response regulators serve as negative regulators for cytokinin signaling. Cytokinin causes the rapid induction of type A response regulators. The type A cytokinin response regulator family in Arabidopsis thaliana consists of 10 genes. Expression of type A cytokinin response regulators decreases sensitivity to cytokinins, and a lack of type-A cytokinin response regulators leads to increased sensitivity to cytokinins.

Type A cytokinin response regulators can act as negative regulators of cytokinin signaling by either competing with type-B positive regulators or by regulating the pathway through direct and indirect interactions with other pathway mechanisms.

Type A cytokinin response regulators are also likely involved in other processes. One example is light signal transduction: ARR3 and ARR4 are involved in the synchronization of the circadian clock of Arabidopsis thaliana with external time and photoperiod. Moreover, ARR6 is implied in the control of Arabidopsis thaliana disease-resistance and cell wall composition.

=== Type B ===
Type B cytokinin response regulators are the positive regulators that oppose the negative regulation of type A cytokinin response regulators in the two-component cytokinin signaling pathway. These regulators play a critical role in early response to cytokinin. Differing expression of type-B cytokinin response regulators likely play a role in controlling cellular response to cytokinins. The type-B cytokinin response regulator family consists of two subfamilies and one major subfamily. The major family of type-B cytokinin response regulators are expressed in locations on the plant that are heavily influenced by cytokinins. These regions where type-B cytokinin response regulators are heavily expressed include apical meristem regions and budding leaves.

ARR1, ARR10, and ARR12 have been indicated to mediate root growth response. Each of ARR1, ARR10, and ARR12 vary in their effect on root growth response, likely related to differences in root expression patterns. ARR1, ARR10, and ARR12 have been determined to have a functional overlap with type B response regulators.

=== Type C ===
Type-C cytokinin response regulators are unique in that their expression is not induced by cytokinins like type-A cytokinin response regulators and type-B cytokinin response regulators. ARR22 and ARR22 and ARR24 are the two known type-C cytokinin response regulators in Arabidopsis thaliana. Research suggests that ARR22 plays a positive role in stress tolerance by improving cell membrane integrity. Increases in expression of ARR22 modulates abiotic stress-responsive genes, possibly aiding in drought and freezing tolerance. However, the role of ARR24 in Arabidopsis plant signaling remains undetermined.
