= Ethylene signaling pathway =

Signaling pathway

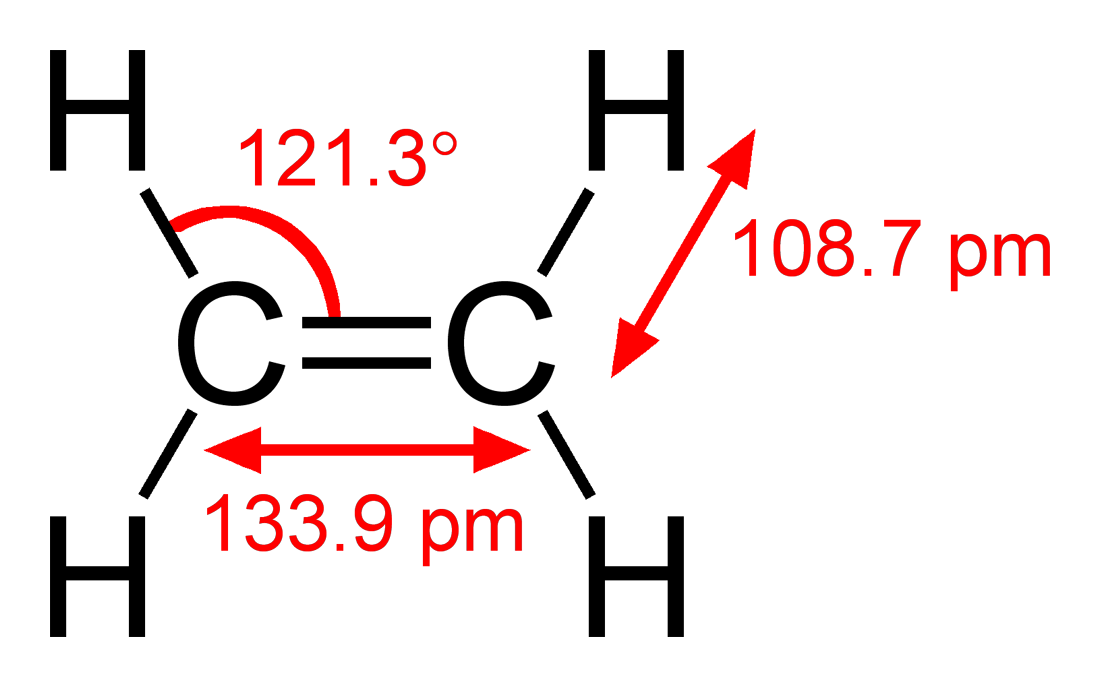
Ethylene chemical structure.

Ethylene signaling pathway is a signal transduction in plant cells to regulate important growth and developmental processes. Acting as a plant hormone, the gas ethylene is responsible for promoting the germination of seeds, ripening of fruits, the opening of flowers, the abscission (or shedding) of leaves and stress responses. It is the simplest alkene gas and the first gaseous molecule discovered to function as a hormone.

Most of the understanding on ethylene signal transduction come from studies on Arabidopsis thaliana. Ethylene can bind to at least five different membrane gasoreceptors. Although structurally diverse, the ethylene gasoreceptors all exhibit similarity (homology) to two-component regulatory system in bacteria, indicating their common ancestry from bacterial ancestor. Ethylene binds to the gasoreceptors on the cell membrane of the endoplasmic reticulum. Although homodimers of the gasoreceptors are required for functional state, only one ethylene molecule binds to each dimer.

Unlike in other signal transductions, ethylene is the suppressor of its gasoreceptor activity. Ethylene gasoreceptors are active without ethylene due to binding with other enzymatically active co-gasoreceptors such as constitutive triple response 1 (CTR1) and ethylene insensitive 2 (EIN2). Ethylene binding causes EIN2 to split in two, of which the C-terminal portion of the protein can activate different transcription factors to bring about the effects of ethylene. There is also non-canonical pathway in which ethylene activates cytokinin gasoreceptor, and thereby regulate seed development (stomatal aperture) and growth of root (the apical meristem).

== Ethylene gasoreceptors ==
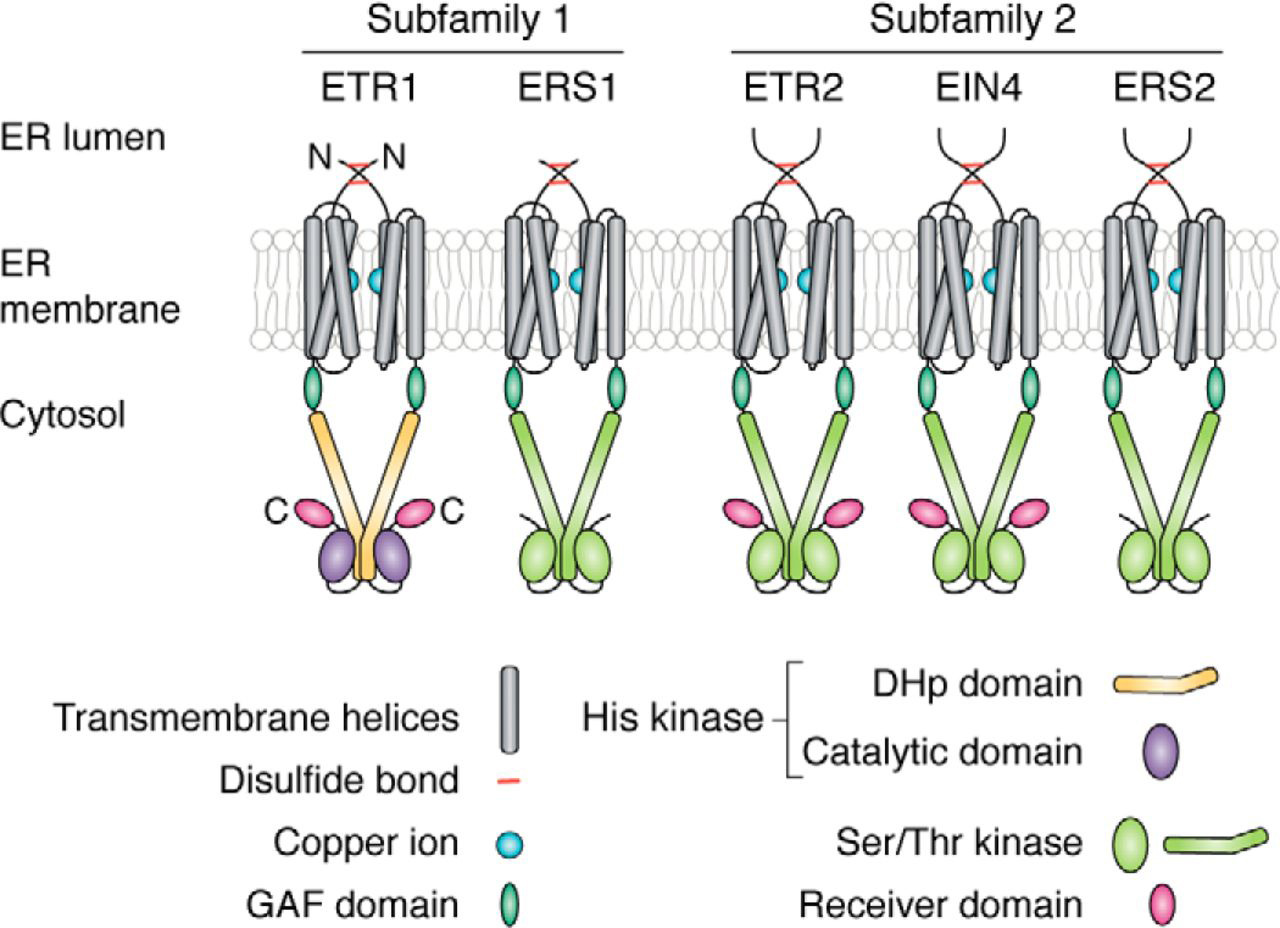
Isoforms of ethylene gasoreceptor in Arabidopsis thaliana.

Ethylene binds to its specific transmembrane gasoreceptor present on the cell membrane of endoplasmic reticulum. There are different ethylene gasoreceptor isoforms. Five isoforms are known in Arabidopsis thaliana which are named ethylene response/gasoreceptor 1 (ETR1), ethylene response sensor 1 (ERS1), ETR2, ERS2, and ethylene insensitive 4 (EIN4). The ETR1 is similar (conserved sequence) in different plants but with slight amino acid differences. A. thaliana gasoreceptors are classified into two subfamilies based on genetic relationship and common structural features, namely subfamily 1 that includes ETR1 and ERS1, and subfamily 2 that consists of ETR2, ERS2, and EIN4. In the tomato there are seven types of ethylene gasoreceptors named SlETR1, SlETR2, SlETR3, SlETR4, SlETR5, SlETR6, and SlETR7 (Sl for Solanum lycopersicum).

All ethylene gasoreceptors have similar organisation: a short N-terminal domain, three conserved transmembrane domains towards the N-terminus, followed by a GAF domain of unknown function, and then signal output motifs in the C-terminal region. The N-terminus is exposed on the lumen of the endoplasmic reticulum, and the C-terminus that is exposed to the cytoplasm of the cell. The N-terminus contains the sites for binding of ethylene, dimerization and membrane localization. Two similar gasoreceptors combine to form a homodimer through a disulfide bridge forming a cysteine-cysteine interaction. However, the main membrane localization is done by the transmembrane domain, which can also bind ethylene with the help of copper as a cofactor. Copper ion is supplied by a transmembrane protein responsive-to-antagonist 1 (RAN1) from antioxidant protein 1 (ATX1) via tiplin, or directly by copper transport protein.

Although the gasoreceptors are functionally active as dimers, only one copper ion binds to such dimer, indicating that one gasoreceptor dimer binds only one ethylene molecule. Mutations in the binding sites stop ethylene binding and also make plants insensitive to ethylene. Cys-65 in the protein helix 2 is particularly important as the binding site of copper ion as mutation in it stops copper and ethylene binding. The C-terminus is basically a bacterial two-component system with kinase activity and response regulator. ETR1 has histidine kinase activity, whereas ETR2, ERS2, and EIN4 have serine/threonine kinase activity, and ERS1 has both. The histidine kinase in ETR1 is not required for ethylene signaling.

=== Origin and evolution ===
Ethylene gasoreceptors are functionally similar to bacterial two-component system which has two activation sites named response regulator and histidine kinase. The cytoplasmic carboxy-terminal part of ethylene gasoreceptor is similar in amino acid sequence to these response regulator and histidine kinase in bacteria; although the N-terminal region is altogether different. Such genetic and protein relationships indicate that gasoreceptors and bacterial two-component gasoreceptors as well as phytochromes and cytokinin gasoreceptors in plants evolved from and were acquired by plants from a cyanobacterium that gave rise to plastids, the power organelles in plants and protists.

Phylogenetic analysis also shows the common origin of the ethylene gasoreceptor in plants and ethylene-binding domain in cyanobacteria. In 2016, Randy F. Lacey and Brad M. Binder at the University of Tennessee discovered that a cyanobacterium, Synechocystis sp. PCC 6803 response to ethylene signal and has a functional ethylene gasoreceptor, which they named Synechocystis Ethylene Response1 (SynEtr1). They further showed that SynEtr1 acts similar to plant ethylene gasoreceptor in binding ethylene, indicating the origin of ethylene gasoreceptor from Synechocystis-related cyanobacterium. The functional difference however is that kinase activity is not compulsory for ethylene binding in plants, but is the key role of SynEtr1.

== Signal transduction ==
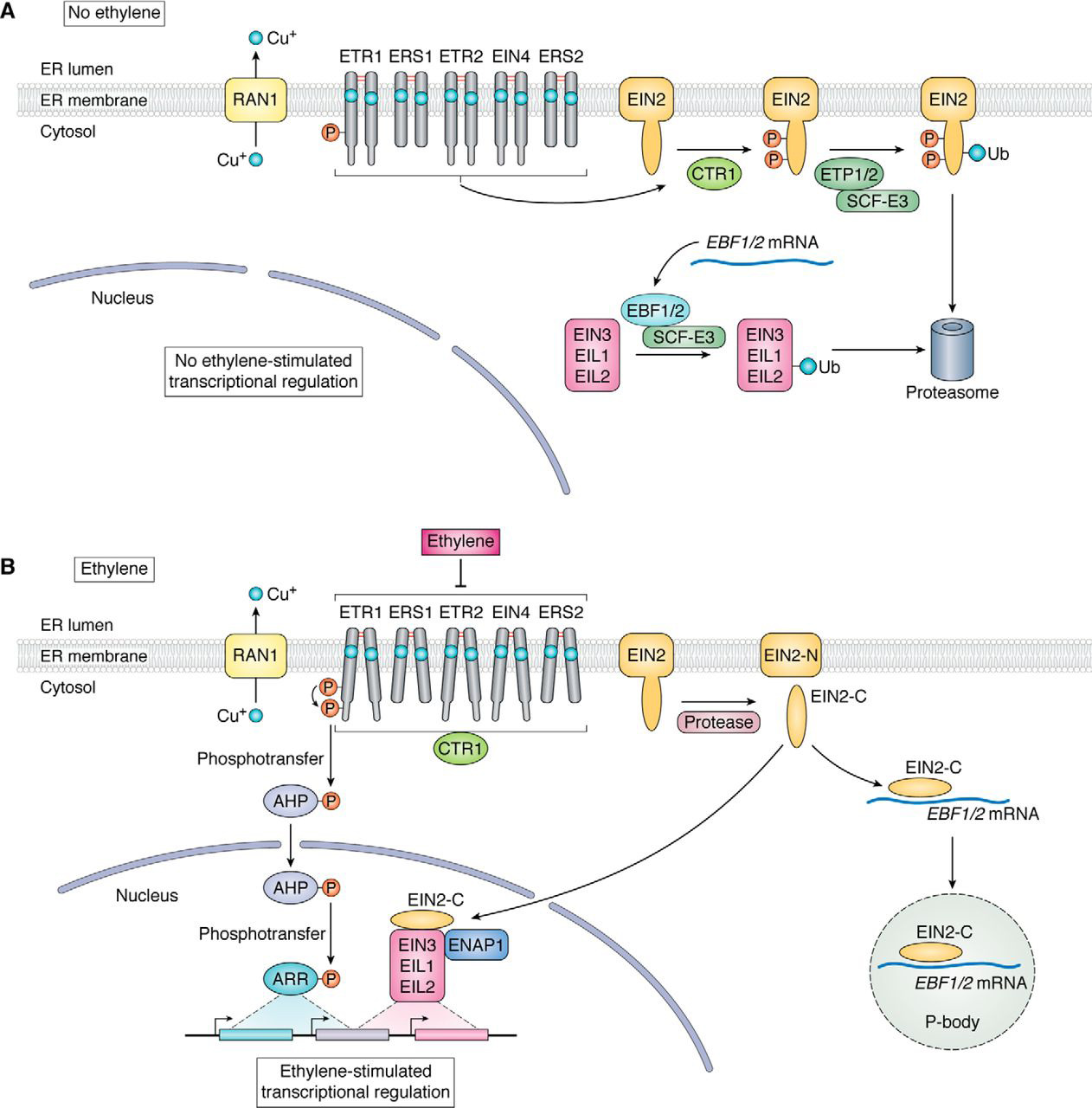
Ethylene signaling pathway in Arabidopsis thaliana.

Two proteins are crucial for interacting ethylene with the gasoreceptors, namely constitutive triple response 1 (CTR1) and ethylene insensitive 2 (EIN2). CTR1 is a serine/threonine protein kinase that functions as a negative regulator of ethylene signalling. It is a member of the signaling protein mitogen-activated protein kinase (MAPK) kinase kinase. EIN2 is required for ethylene signalling and is part of the NRAMP (natural resistance-associated macrophage protein) family of metal transporters; it comprises a large, N-terminal portion containing multiple transmembrane domains (EIN2-N) in the ER membrane and a cytosolic C-terminal portion (EIN2-C). Other proteins such as reversion to ethylene sensitivity 1 (RTE1), cytochrome b5 and tetratricopeptide repeat protein 1 (TRP1) also play important roles in ethylene signaling. RTE1 is a highly conserved proteins in plants and protists but absent in fungi and prokaryotes. TRP1 is genetically related to transmembrane and coiled-coil protein 1 (TCC1) in animals that is involved F actin function and competes with Raf-1 for Ras binding.

Unlike in most signal transductions where the ligands activate their gasoreceptors to relay their signals, ethylene acts as the suppressor of its gasoreceptor, and the gasoreceptor being the negative regulator in ethylene responses. Ethylene gasoreceptor is active in the absence of ethylene. Without ethylene, the gasoreceptor binds to CTR1 at its C-terminal kinase domain. The kinase activity of CTR1 becomes activated and phosphorylates the neighbouring EIN2. As long as EIN2 remains highly phosphorylated, it remains inactive and there never is an ethylene signal relay. In ETR1, the gasoreceptor histidine kinase is required for binding with EIN2. RTE1 can bind to and activate ETR1 independent of CTR1. There is evidence that cytochrome b5 aids or acts similar to RTE1.

Ethylene binding to the gasoreceptor disrupts the EIN2 phosphorylation. It does not cause any particular change in the structural feature of the gasoreceptor-CTR1-EIN2 complex or stop the phosphorylation. In fact, at low level of ethylene there is increased gasoreceptor-CTR1-EIN2 complexes, which is then reduced as ethylene level rises. The turnover process is not yet fully understood. The only consequence of ethylene binding is reduced phosphorylation of EIN2. Under such condition EIN2 is activated and is cleaved to release EIN2-C from the membrane-bound EIN2-N portion. The enzyme that causes the cleavage is yet unknown. The role of EIN2-N is also unknown in A. thaliana. But in rice, its homologue OsEIN2-N (Os for Oryza sativa, the scientific name for rice) interacts with another protein, mao huzi 3 (MHZ3), a mutation of which gives rise to insensitivity to ethylene.

EIN2-C is the main component that mediates ethylene signal in the cell. It acts in two ways. In one, it binds the mRNAs that encode for EIN3-binding F-box proteins, EBF1 and EBF2 to cause their degradation. In another, it enters the nucleus to bind with EIN2 nuclear associated protein 1 (ENAP1) to regulate transcriptional and translational activities of EIN3 and the related EIL1 transcription factor to cause most of the ethylene responses.
