= Protein histidine kinase =

Protein histidine kinase may refer to:

- Histidine kinase, an enzyme
- Protein-histidine tele-kinase, an enzyme
- Protein-histidine pros-kinase, an enzyme
