= Sda protein domain =

Sda
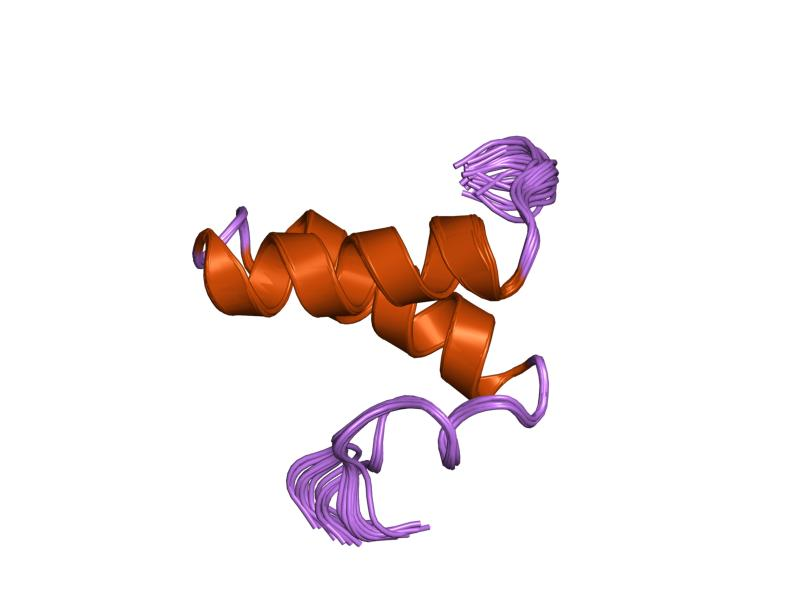
- structure of the sda antikinase

Identifiers
- Symbol: Sda
- Pfam: PF08970
- InterPro: IPR015064
Available protein structures:
- PDB: IPR015064 PF08970 (ECOD; PDBsum)
- AlphaFold: IPR015064; PF08970

In molecular biology, the protein domain Sda is short for suppressor of dnaA or otherwise known as sporulation inhibitor A. It is found only in bacteria. This protein domain is highly important to cell survival. When starved of nutrients, the cell is under extreme stress so undergoes a series of reactions to increase the chances of survival. One method is to form endospores which can withstand a large amount of environmental pressure. Sda protein domain is a checkpoint which prevents the formation of spores. The Sda domain affects cell signalling. It prevents the cell communicating the stress that it is under, which is crucial if the cell is to survive.

== Cell signalling ==
All cells communicate through cell signalling. The Sda protein domain inhibits the Histidine kinase signal transduction. This signal transduction mechanism is switched on when the cell is under stress, such as nutrient deprivation. It works through the kinase first autophosphorylating the Histidine residue and this triggers sporulation. Sda prevents this pathway from occurring by inhibiting the histidine kinase. More specifically, Sda can be considered an antikinase and binds to KinA. The Sda-KinA complex now physically blocks any phosphorylation of the Histidine Kinase residue.

== Function ==
These sporulation inhibitors are anti-kinases that bind to the histidine kinase KinA phosphotransfer protein domain and act as a molecular barricade that inhibit productive interaction between the ATP binding site and the phosphorylatable KinA His residue. This results in the inhibition of sporulation through the prevention of phosphorylation of spo0A, a transcription factor.

== Structure ==
Members of this protein group contain two antiparallel alpha helices that are linked by an inter-helix loop to form a helical hairpin. These monomers associate to form a simple trimeric arrangement.
