= Histidine phosphotransfer domain =

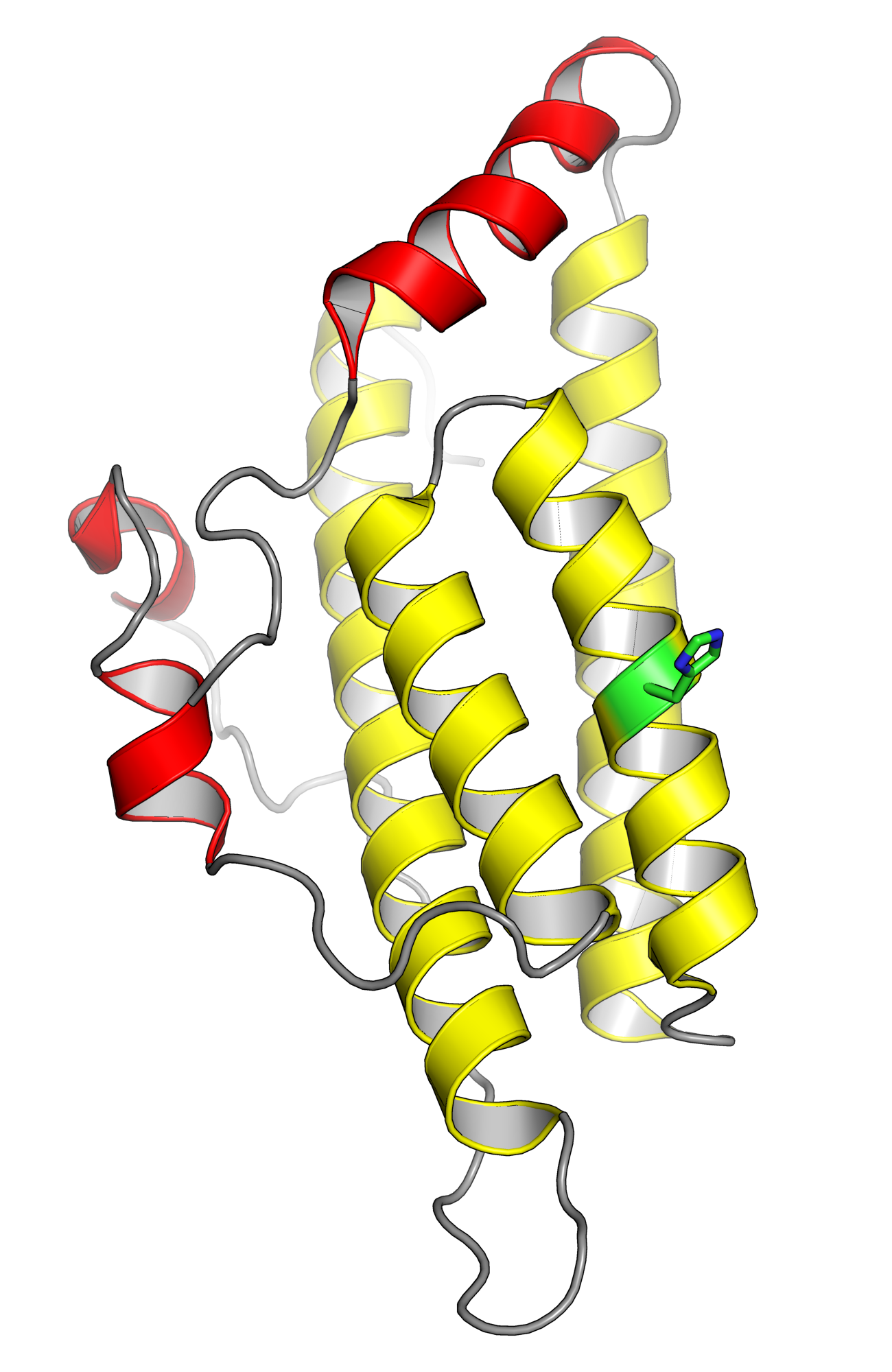
- The crystal structure of the yeast histidine phosphotransferase protein Ypd1. The four helices shown in yellow comprise the conserved four-helix bundle typical of monomeric HPt domains; the helices shown in red are insertions specific to Ypd1. The histidine phosphorylation site is shown in green. From PDB: 1C02.

Identifiers
- Symbol: Hpt
- Pfam: PF01627
- InterPro: IPR008207
- SMART: HPT
- PROSITE: PS50894
Available protein structures:
- PDB: IPR008207 PF01627 (ECOD; PDBsum)
- AlphaFold: IPR008207; PF01627

Histidine phosphotransferase
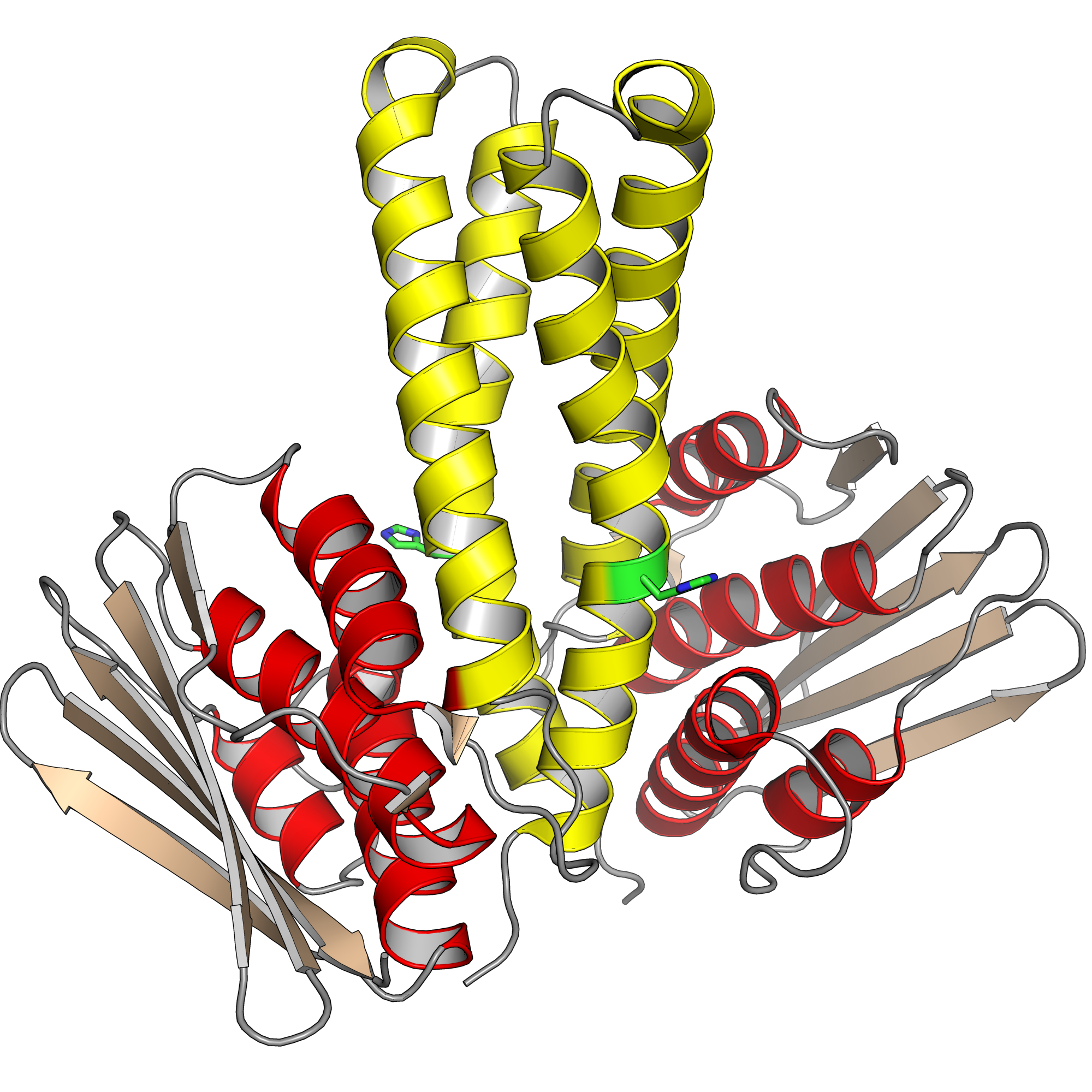
- The crystal structure of the Caulobacter crescentus histidine phosphotransferase protein ChpT in dimeric form. The four helices shown in yellow comprise the conserved four-helix bundle, with the histidine phosphorylation sites highlighted in green. The domains shown in red and tan are pseudo-CA domains that resemble the ATP-binding domains of histidine kinases, but do not bind or hydrolyze ATP. From PDB: 4FMT.

Identifiers
- Symbol: HPTransfase
- Pfam: PF10090
- InterPro: IPR018762
Available protein structures:
- PDB: IPR018762 PF10090 (ECOD; PDBsum)
- AlphaFold: IPR018762; PF10090

Histidine phosphotransfer domains and histidine phosphotransferases (both often abbreviated HPt) are protein domains involved in the "phosphorelay" form of two-component regulatory systems. These proteins possess a phosphorylatable histidine residue and are responsible for transferring a phosphoryl group from an aspartate residue on an intermediate "receiver" domain, typically part of a hybrid histidine kinase, to an aspartate on a final response regulator.

== Function ==
In orthodox two-component signaling, a histidine kinase protein autophosphorylates on a histidine residue in response to an extracellular signal, and the phosphoryl group is subsequently transferred to an aspartate residue on the receiver domain of a response regulator. In phosphorelays, the "hybrid" histidine kinase contains an internal aspartate-containing receiver domain to which the phosphoryl group is transferred, after which an HPt protein containing a phosphorylatable histidine receives the phosphoryl group and finally transfers it to the response regulator. The relay system thus progresses in the order His-Asp-His-Asp, with the second His contributed by Hpt. In some cases, a phosphorelay system is constructed from four separate proteins rather than a hybrid histidine kinase with an internal receiver domain, and in other examples both the receiver and the HPt domains are present in the histidine kinase polypeptide chain. A census of two-component system domain architecture found that HPt domains in bacteria are more common as domains of larger proteins than they are as individual proteins.

== Regulation ==
The increased complexity of the phosphorelay system compared to orthodox two-component signaling provides additional opportunities for regulation and improves the specificity of the response. Although there is very little cross-talk between orthodox two-component systems, phosphorelays allow more complex signaling pathways; examples include a bifurcated pathway with multiple downstream outputs, as in the case of the Caulobacter crescentus ChpT HPt involved in cell cycle regulation, or, alternatively, pathways in which more than one histidine kinase controls a single response regulator, such as the sporulation pathway in Bacillus subtilis, which can give rise to complex temporal variations. In some known cases, there is an additional form of regulation in phosphohistidine phosphatase enzymes that act on HPt, such as the Escherichia coli protein SixA which targets ArcB.

== Structure ==
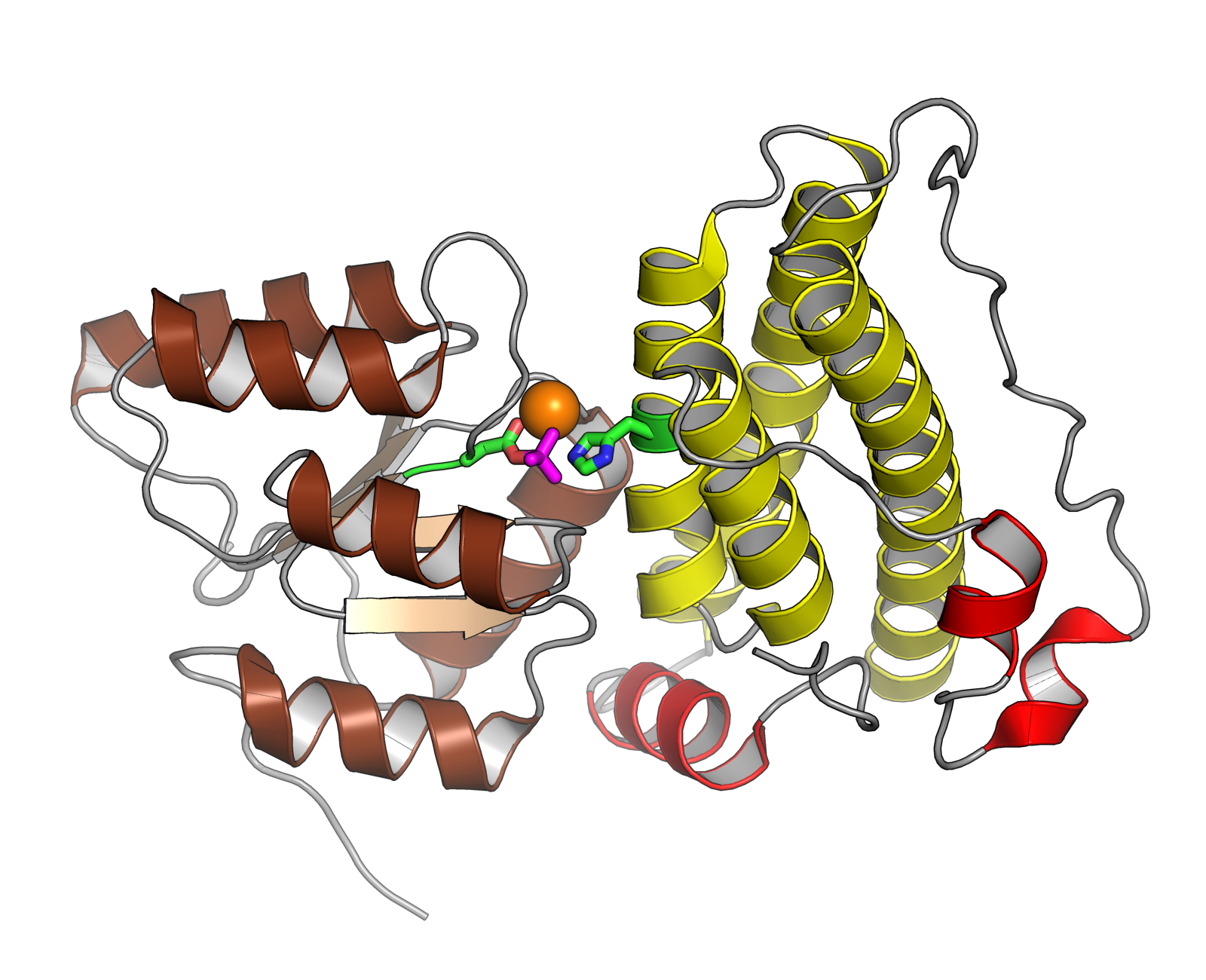
The crystal structure of the yeast Hpt Ypd1 in complex with the response regulator Sln1. Ypd1 appears on the right with the conserved four-helical bundle in yellow and variable helices in red. Sln1 appears on the left with beta sheets in tan and helices in brown. The key residues - Asp from Sln1 and His from Ypd1 - are highlighted with green sticks. A bound magnesium ion is shown as an orange sphere and beryllium trifluoride, a phosphoryl analog, is shown in pink. From PDB: 2R25.

The histidine phosphotransfer function can be carried out by proteins with at least two different architectures, both composed of a four-helix bundle but differing in the way the bundle is assembled. Most structurally characterized HPt proteins, such as the Hpt domain from the Escherichia coli protein ArcB and the Saccharomyces cerevisiae protein Ypd1, form the bundle as monomers. In the less common type, such as the Bacillus subtilis sporulation factor Spo0B or the Caulobacter crescentus protein ChpT, the bundle is assembled as a protein dimer, with similarity to the structure of histidine kinases. Monomeric HPt domains possess only one phosphorylatable histidine residue and interact with one response regulator, whereas dimers have two phosphorylation sites and can interact with two response regulators at the same time. Monomeric HPt domains have no enzymatic activity of their own and act purely as phosphate shuttles, while the dimeric Spo0B is catalytic; its phosphotransfer rate to the recipient response regulator is dramatically accelerated compared to histidine phosphate. Despite possessing a second domain with some similarity to ATPase domains, dimeric HPt proteins have not been shown to bind or hydrolyze ATP and lack key residues present in other ATPases.

The monomeric and dimeric forms do not have detectable sequence similarity and are most likely not evolutionarily related; they are instead examples of convergent evolution. Although dimeric HPts likely originate from degenerate histidine kinases, it is possible that monomeric HPts have a number of distinct origins, as there are few evolutionary constraints on the structure.

== Distribution ==
In bacteria, where two-component signaling is extremely common, about 25% of known histidine kinases are of the hybrid type. Two-component systems are much rarer in archaea and eukaryotes, and occur in lower eukaryotes and in plants but not in metazoans. Among known examples, most if not all eukaryotic two-component systems are hybrid kinase phosphorelays.

A bioinformatic census of bacterial genomes found large variations in the number of (monomeric) HPt domains identified in different bacterial phyla, with some genomes encoding no HPts at all. Relative to the number of histidine kinase and response regulators present in a genome, eukaryotes have more identifiable HPt domains than bacteria. In fungi, the genomic inventory of HPt proteins varies, with filamentous fungi generally possessing more HPt proteins than yeasts; only one is encoded in the well-characterized Saccharomyces cerevisiae genome. Plants generally have more than one HPt, but fewer HPts than response regulators.
