= KdpD/KdpE two-component system =

Biological regulatory system

The KdpD/KdpE two-component system is a regulatory system involved in controlling potassium transport and intracellular osmolarity of pathogenic bacteria. It plays an important role in potassium transport for the osmoregulation of bacteria. In some bacteria, it can act as a virulence factor and acquire new adaptations from different selective pressures in the environment. It is also demonstrated to maintain internal pH, stress responses, enzyme activation, and gene expression. K+ ions are used for necessary biological processes and can generate a negative electric potential on the cytoplasmic side of the plasma membrane. There are different uptake systems for K+ ions, but the specific mechanisms vary between species.

== Physiological significance ==
The KdpD/KdpE system is mainly responsible for the regulation of potassium concentrations within the cell to maintain homeostasis. This system is induced and repressed by quorum molecules, nutrient levels, pH, and ATP concentrations. It can be triggered when there is a lack of potassium ions in the cell, which may be sensed by a decrease in turgor pressure. Interestingly, the kdpFABC gene is reportedly only activated by salts and not sugar, despite both of them increasing osmolarity. This system has a higher affinity for potassium ions compared to average potassium pumps.

The KdpD/KdpE system can contribute to an organism's virulence factor and aid in longer survival. In a study, they examined a strain of avian pathogenic E.coli, AE17ΔKdpDE, and created deletion mutants that affected the KdpD/KdpE system. They found that the deletion mutants, when compared to the WT, had decreased motility, fewer flagellum, altered metabolic pathways, and assembly of movement mechanisms. Since the deletion mutant's motility was significantly underdeveloped, it significantly decreased the virulence of the avian E.coli. Another study inserted the KdpD/KdpE system gene from Photorhabdus asymbiotica into E. coli via a transposition, which resulted in E. coli being able to evade the host cells and not perish by phagocytosis.

== Components of the system ==
KdpD, a sensor kinase, is sensitive to changes in extracellular concentrations of potassium. KdpD is a homodimer consisting of four transmembrane domains, an N-terminal cytoplasmic domain, and a C-terminal cytoplasmic domain. KdpD possesses autokinase, phosphotransferase, and protein phosphatase activity. KdpD undergoes autophosphorylation due to fluctuations in the concentration of potassium. The phosphorylated KdpD-P activates KdpE.

KdpE, a transcriptional regulator, regulates the expression of genes containing high-affinity potassium transport systems. KdpE is a cytoplasmic, homodimer protein. KdpE is phosphorylated by KdpD-P. The activated KdpE-P, a transcription factor, binds to the kdpFABC operon encoding high-affinity potassium transporters.

== Activation mechanism ==
The early models of KdpD stimulus proposed that KdpD sensed changes in turgor pressure. It was later found that the intracellular concentration of potassium affects the autophosphorylation of KdpD. High concentrations of intracellular potassium inhibit the autophosphorylation of KdpD. KdpD also detects changes in intracellular ionic strength. Higher concentrations of extracellular salts stimulate KdpD phosphorylation. The N-terminal domain contains two parts (Walker A & B) that act as ATP-binding sites. The intracellular level of ATP affects the autophosphorylation of KdpD. Accessory proteins like UspC act as scaffolding proteins during salt stress. UspC belongs to a family of scaffolding proteins called universal stress proteins. UspC stabilizes the KdpD/KdpE complex during phosphotransferase activity.

== Gene expression regulation ==
The activated KdpE-P acts as a transcriptional activator by attaching to the operon of the kdpFABC gene. The resulting KdpFABC complex is a high-affinity potassium P-Type ATPase. This ATPase transports potassium intracellularly against the electrochemical gradient using ATP. The KdpF subunit stabilizes the transport complex. The KdpA subunit is responsible for the binding and translocation of potassium ions. The KdpB subunit is responsible for the hydrolysis of ATP to provide energy for translocation. The KdpC subunit is an inner membrane protein with no known function.

== Examples of bacterial species ==
The KdpD/KdpE two-component system (TCS) is something that can be found in many bacterial genera/species. A few examples of bacteria that use this system are Escherichia coli, Staphylococcus aureus, and Mycobacterium.

KdpD/KdpE is a TCS system that is found in Escherichia coli and produces the K+ transporter Kdp-ATPase. This TCS system was characterized first in the bacterial species of E. coli. The transporter is used as a scavenging system for K+ when it is extremely limited. The TCS system for E. coli has four distinct proteins from one single operon, kdpFABC. The element that regulates the TCS is KdpD/E and is located downstream from the gene KdpC. When there is a K+ limitation, typically from an added salt, KdpD histidine kinase autophosphorylation and the response regulator, KdpE, receive the phosphoryl group. After which, affinity increases by 23 base pairs in the sequence upstream from the promoter kdpFABC, which triggers transcription. This system is used in many gram-negative and gram-positive bacteria.

Currently, KdpD/E is a TCS found in Staphylococcus aureus. This shows repression on transcription for kdpFABC. This happens in all conditions of K+ and brings to attention that KdpFABC is not a major transporter for K+. When KdpD/E becomes inactivated, transcription becomes altered for virulence genes. This alteration can affect many different genes, including, but not limited to, Spa, Geh, HLA, etc. KdpE binds directly to promoter regions of these genes to regulate transcription for them. KdpD/E transcript levels can be directly related to K+ concentration externally. The S. aureus can modulate infection status by using K+ external stimuli from the environment. The transcript level of KdpD/E can also become activated by Agr/RNAIII when in the post-exponential phase, which was confirmed through Rot.

The Kdp system is found in many different Mycobacterium species, including M. tuberculosis, M. avium, M. bovis, M. smegmatis, M. marinum, and others. The Kdp, although, is not contained within the M. leprae and M. ulcerans spp. The KdpD/KdpE TCS is not a well-characterized system for the spp. smegmatis because there are many different types of TCS in many different types of Mycobacterium spp. The KdpD/KdpE is a TCS in Mycobacterial species that can regulate potassium homeostasis, the regulation mechanism, and function for target genes that are located downstream, which help with infections from Mycobacteria. The system could be a target for antibiotic resistance for the mycobacterial infection because of the major differences within the potassium uptake systems of eukaryotes and prokaryotes. In these spp., the KdpE binds to the promoter region for the kdpFABC operon (PkdpF) and the KdpF coding sequence for Mycobacteria is found.

== Research and applications ==
The KdpD/KdpE system is often altered for genetic experiments in virulence and pathogenicity. For example, an experiment took the genes for the KdpD/KdpE system and inserted them into avian pathogenic E.coli cells using a transposon and compared them to an unaltered group. The insertion mutants were less likely to be killed via phagocytosis and had an effect on the cells' metabolism, global transcription, and flagellar assembly. In another study, the genes of the KdpD/KdpE system from Photorhabdus asymbiotica were put into a lab strain of E.coli via a transposon. They observed that the previously susceptible E.coli strain was now able to resist phagocytic killing and persist longer against host cells.
