= Two-component regulatory system =

Method of stimulus sensing and response in cells

Histidine kinase

Identifiers
- Symbol: His_kinase
- Pfam: PF06580
- InterPro: IPR016380
- OPM superfamily: 281
- OPM protein: 5iji
Available protein structures:
- PDB: IPR016380 PF06580 (ECOD; PDBsum)
- AlphaFold: IPR016380; PF06580

His Kinase A (phospho-acceptor) domain
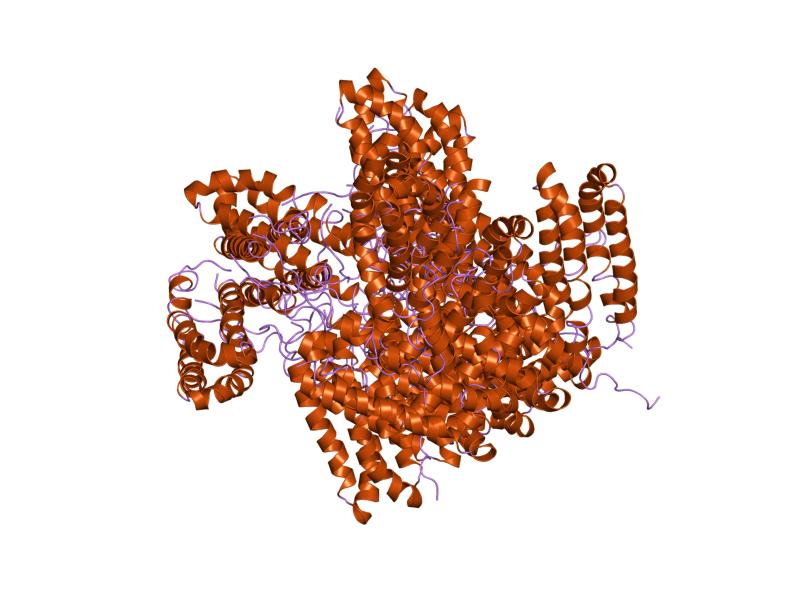
- solved structure of the homodimeric domain of EnvZ from Escherichia coli by multi-dimensional NMR.

Identifiers
- Symbol: HisKA
- Pfam: PF00512
- Pfam clan: CL0025
- InterPro: IPR003661
- SMART: HisKA
- SCOP2: 1b3q / SCOPe / SUPFAM
Available protein structures:
- PDB: IPR003661 PF00512 (ECOD; PDBsum)
- AlphaFold: IPR003661; PF00512

Histidine kinase

Identifiers
- Symbol: HisKA_2
- Pfam: PF07568
- Pfam clan: CL0025
- InterPro: IPR011495
Available protein structures:
- PDB: IPR011495 PF07568 (ECOD; PDBsum)
- AlphaFold: IPR011495; PF07568

Histidine kinase

Identifiers
- Symbol: HisKA_3
- Pfam: PF07730
- Pfam clan: CL0025
- InterPro: IPR011712
Available protein structures:
- PDB: IPR011712 PF07730 (ECOD; PDBsum)
- AlphaFold: IPR011712; PF07730

Signal transducing histidine kinase, homodimeric domain
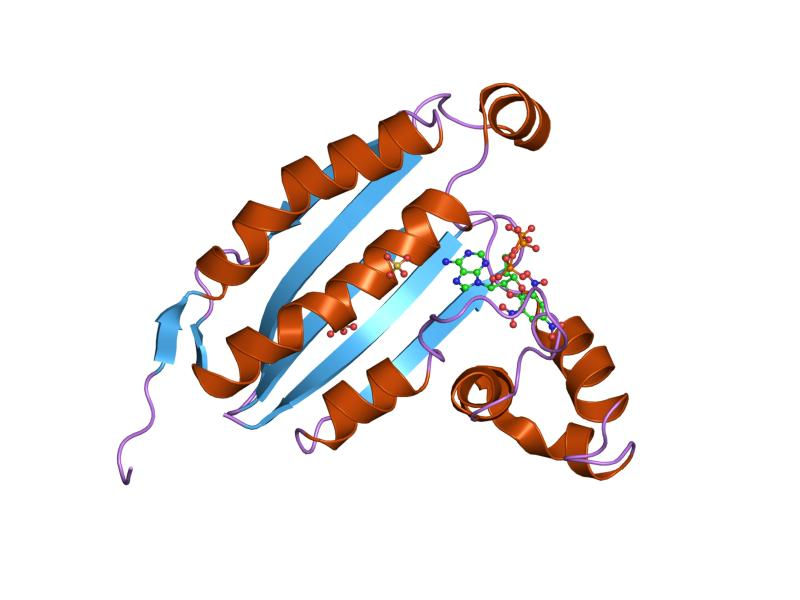
- structure of CheA domain p4 in complex with TNP-ATP

Identifiers
- Symbol: H-kinase_dim
- Pfam: PF02895
- InterPro: IPR004105
- SCOP2: 1b3q / SCOPe / SUPFAM
Available protein structures:
- PDB: IPR004105 PF02895 (ECOD; PDBsum)
- AlphaFold: IPR004105; PF02895

Histidine kinase N terminal

Identifiers
- Symbol: HisK_N
- Pfam: PF09385
- InterPro: IPR018984
Available protein structures:
- PDB: IPR018984 PF09385 (ECOD; PDBsum)
- AlphaFold: IPR018984; PF09385

Osmosensitive K^{+} channel His kinase sensor domain

Identifiers
- Symbol: KdpD
- Pfam: PF02702
- InterPro: IPR003852
Available protein structures:
- PDB: IPR003852 PF02702 (ECOD; PDBsum)
- AlphaFold: IPR003852; PF02702

In molecular biology, a two-component regulatory system serves as a basic stimulus-response coupling mechanism to allow organisms to sense and respond to changes in many different environmental conditions. Two-component systems typically consist of a membrane-bound histidine kinase that senses a specific environmental stimulus, and a corresponding response regulator that mediates the cellular response, mostly through differential expression of target genes. Although two-component signaling systems are found in all domains of life, they are most common by far in bacteria, particularly in Gram-negative and cyanobacteria; both histidine kinases and response regulators are among the largest gene families in bacteria. They are much less common in archaea and eukaryotes; although they do appear in yeasts, filamentous fungi, and slime molds, and are common in plants, two-component systems have been described as "conspicuously absent" from animals.

== Mechanism ==
Two-component systems accomplish signal transduction through the phosphorylation of a response regulator (RR) by a histidine kinase (HK). Histidine kinases are typically homodimeric transmembrane proteins containing a histidine phosphotransfer domain and an ATP binding domain, though there are reported examples of histidine kinases in the atypical HWE and HisKA2 families that are not homodimers. Response regulators may consist only of a receiver domain, but usually are multi-domain proteins with a receiver domain and at least one effector or output domain, often involved in DNA binding. Upon detecting a particular change in the extracellular environment, the HK performs an autophosphorylation reaction, transferring a phosphoryl group from adenosine triphosphate (ATP) to a specific histidine residue. The cognate response regulator (RR) then catalyzes the transfer of the phosphoryl group to an aspartate residue on the response regulator's receiver domain. This typically triggers a conformational change that activates the RR's effector domain, which in turn produces the cellular response to the signal, usually by stimulating (or repressing) expression of target genes.

Many HKs are bifunctional and possess phosphatase activity against their cognate response regulators, so that their signaling output reflects a balance between their kinase and phosphatase activities. Many response regulators also auto-dephosphorylate, and the relatively labile phosphoaspartate can also be hydrolyzed non-enzymatically. The overall level of phosphorylation of the response regulator ultimately controls its activity.

=== Phosphorelays ===
Some histidine kinases are hybrids that contain an internal receiver domain. In these cases, a hybrid HK autophosphorylates and then transfers the phosphoryl group to its own internal receiver domain, rather than to a separate RR protein. The phosphoryl group is then shuttled to histidine phosphotransferase (HPT) and subsequently to a terminal RR, which can evoke the desired response. This system is called a phosphorelay. Almost 25% of bacterial HKs are of the hybrid type, as are the large majority of eukaryotic HKs.

== Function ==
Two-component signal transduction systems enable bacteria to sense, respond, and adapt to a wide range of environments, stressors, and growth conditions. These pathways have been adapted to respond to a wide variety of stimuli, including nutrients, cellular redox state, changes in osmolarity, quorum signals, antibiotics, temperature, chemoattractants, pH and more. The average number of two-component systems in a bacterial genome has been estimated as around 30, or about 1–2% of a prokaryote's genome. A few bacteria have none at all – typically endosymbionts and pathogens – and others contain over 200. All such systems must be closely regulated to prevent cross-talk, which is rare in vivo.

In Escherichia coli, the osmoregulatory EnvZ/OmpR two-component system controls the differential expression of the outer membrane porin proteins OmpF and OmpC. The KdpD sensor kinase proteins regulate the kdpFABC operon responsible for potassium transport in bacteria including E. coli and Clostridium acetobutylicum. The N-terminal domain of this protein forms part of the cytoplasmic region of the protein, which may be the sensor domain responsible for sensing turgor pressure.

In Escherichia coli, the Rcs phosphorelay system responds to envelope stress and regulates capsular synthesis and motility; it is negatively regulated by the inner membrane protein IgaA.

== Histidine kinases ==
Signal transducing histidine kinases are the key elements in two-component signal transduction systems. Examples of histidine kinases are EnvZ, which plays a central role in osmoregulation, and CheA, which plays a central role in the chemotaxis system. Histidine kinases usually have an N-terminal ligand-binding domain and a C-terminal kinase domain, but other domains may also be present. The kinase domain is responsible for the autophosphorylation of the histidine with ATP, the phosphotransfer from the kinase to an aspartate of the response regulator, and (with bifunctional enzymes) the phosphotransfer from aspartyl phosphate to water. The kinase core has a unique fold, distinct from that of the Ser/Thr/Tyr kinase superfamily.

HKs can be roughly divided into two classes: orthodox and hybrid kinases. Most orthodox HKs, typified by the E. coli EnvZ protein, function as periplasmic membrane receptors and have a signal peptide and transmembrane segment(s) that separate the protein into a periplasmic N-terminal sensing domain and a highly conserved cytoplasmic C-terminal kinase core. Members of this family, however, have an integral membrane sensor domain. Not all orthodox kinases are membrane bound, e.g., the nitrogen regulatory kinase NtrB (GlnL) is a soluble cytoplasmic HK. Hybrid kinases contain multiple phosphodonor and phosphoacceptor sites and use multi-step phospho-relay schemes instead of promoting a single phosphoryl transfer. In addition to the sensor domain and kinase core, they contain a CheY-like receiver domain and a His-containing phosphotransfer (HPt) domain.

== Evolution ==
The number of two-component systems present in a bacterial genome is highly correlated with genome size as well as ecological niche; bacteria that occupy niches with frequent environmental fluctuations possess more histidine kinases and response regulators. New two-component systems may arise by gene duplication or by lateral gene transfer, and the relative rates of each process vary dramatically across bacterial species. In most cases, response regulator genes are located in the same operon as their cognate histidine kinase; lateral gene transfers are more likely to preserve operon structure than gene duplications.

== In eukaryotes ==
Two-component systems are rare in eukaryotes. They appear in yeasts, filamentous fungi, and slime molds, and are relatively common in plants, but have been described as "conspicuously absent" from animals. Two-component systems in eukaryotes likely originate from lateral gene transfer, often from endosymbiotic organelles, and are typically of the hybrid kinase phosphorelay type. For example, in the yeast Candida albicans, genes found in the nuclear genome likely originated from endosymbiosis and remain targeted to the mitochondria. Two-component systems are well-integrated into developmental signaling pathways in plants, but the genes probably originated from lateral gene transfer from chloroplasts. An example is the chloroplast sensor kinase (CSK) gene in Arabidopsis thaliana, derived from chloroplasts but now integrated into the nuclear genome. CSK function provides a redox-based regulatory system that couples photosynthesis to chloroplast gene expression; this observation has been described as a key prediction of the CoRR hypothesis, which aims to explain the retention of genes encoded by endosymbiotic organelles.

It is unclear why canonical two-component systems are rare in eukaryotes, with many similar functions having been taken over by signaling systems based on serine, threonine, or tyrosine kinases; it has been speculated that the chemical instability of phosphoaspartate is responsible, and that increased stability is needed to transduce signals in the more complex eukaryotic cell. Notably, cross-talk between signaling mechanisms is very common in eukaryotic signaling systems but rare in bacterial two-component systems.

== Bioinformatics ==
Because of their sequence similarity and operon structure, many two-component systems – particularly histidine kinases – are relatively easy to identify through bioinformatics analysis. (By contrast, eukaryotic kinases are typically easily identified, but they are not easily paired with their substrates.) A database of prokaryotic two-component systems called P2CS has been compiled to document and classify known examples, and in some cases to make predictions about the cognates of "orphan" histidine kinase or response regulator proteins that are genetically unlinked to a partner.
