= XOL-1 Switch protein N-terminal domain =

Xol-1_N
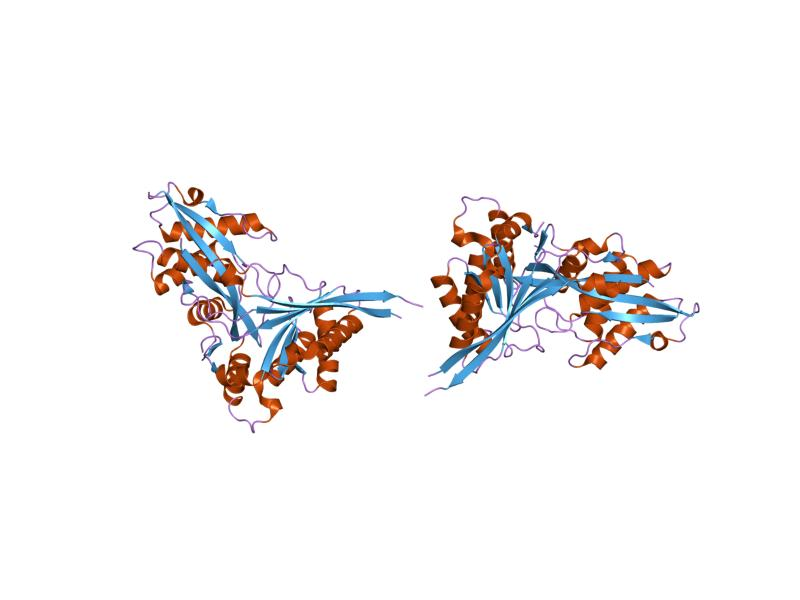
- crystal structure of xol-1

Identifiers
- Symbol: Xol-1_N
- Pfam: PF09108
- Pfam clan: CL0329
- InterPro: IPR015192
- SCOP2: 1mg7 / SCOPe / SUPFAM
Available protein structures:
- PDB: IPR015192 PF09108 (ECOD; PDBsum)
- AlphaFold: IPR015192; PF09108

In molecular biology, Xol-1 is a protein domain, also named the Switch protein, is essentially a sex-determining protein. This entry focuses on the N-terminal domain of Xol-1. Xol-1, the master switch gene controlling sex-determination system and dosage compensation. This protein is normally expressed in males, where it promotes male development and prevents dosage compensation.

== Function ==
The function of the Xol-1 protein is to act as a primary sex-determining factor that promotes sexual differentiation. It is required for proper sexual differentiation and male viability. High expression during gastrulation triggers male development, while low expression at that time triggers hermaphrodite development. Although related to GHMP kinase, its mode of action remains unclear.

== Structure ==
The protein adopts a secondary structure consisting of five alpha helices and six antiparallel beta sheets. The fold of this family is similar to that found in ribosomal protein S5 domain 2-like. The active site of the enzyme is found at the interface between this domain and the C-terminal GHMP-like domain.
