= Chloroplast sensor kinase =

Protein in chloroplasts and cyanobacteria

Identifiers
- Organism: Arabidopsis thaliana
- Symbol: CSK
- Entrez: 843110
- Orthologs: NCBI: entry; OMA: entry
- RefSeq (mRNA): NP_564908.1
- RefSeq (Prot): NP_564908.1
- UniProt: F4HVG8

Other data
- EC number: 2.7.10.2
- Chromosome: 1: 25.43 - 25.44 Mb
Search for
- Structures: Swiss-model
- Domains: InterPro

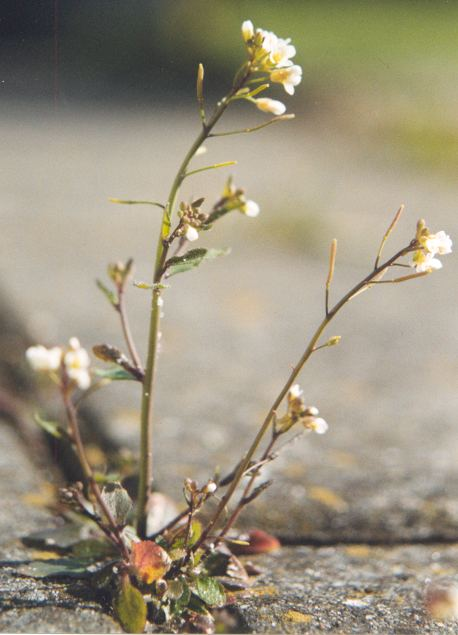
CSK gene in Arabidopsis thaliana is known as At1g67840

Chloroplast Sensor Kinase (CSK) is a protein in chloroplasts and cyanobacteria, bacteria from which chloroplasts evolved by endosymbiosis. It is a protein surviving from part of an ancient bacterial two-component regulatory system. Although its gene was relocated to the nuclear genome during evolution in the plant Arabidopsis thaliana (known in A. thaliana as the gene At1g67840), the CSK protein is produced in the cytosol and subsequently imported into the chloroplast.

== Structure ==
Structurally, CSK preserves the core HisKA and HATPase_c domains typical of bacterial sensor histidine kinases, supporting its homology with classical bacterial HKs. However, in higher plants the canonical histidine residue used for autophosphorylation is replaced by a glutamate, and the kinase domain is functionally modified, indicating a significant evolutionary divergence from the classical bacterial mechanism and raising questions about whether CSK retains traditional histidine autophosphorylation activity.

Attempts to express CSK genetically in E. coli have generally yielded insoluble protein, although in vitro reconstitution of its Fe-S cluster has been achieved.

== Redox sensing ==
CSK is an iron-sulfur protein with 3 iron and 4 sulphur atoms in its redox-active site. It has a midpoint redox potential of −15 mV at pH 8, which is consistent with its autophosphorylation communicating the redox state of the plastoquinone pool to regulation of chloroplast or cyanobacterial DNA transcription – specifically of genes for proteins at the photochemical reaction center of photosystem I. In identifying the redox state of the plastoquinone (PQ) pool, the electron carrier linking photosystem II and photosystem I, CSK functions as a redox sensor. Since it contains (3Fe and 4S) iron-sulfur cluster that undergoes reversible structural and electronic changes dependent on redox. When the PQ pool is oxidized, the Fe-S cluster remains oxidized and CSK's autokinase activity is active. Reduction of the FE-S cluster, presumably reflects a more reduced PQ pool, suppresses CSK autophosphorylation. PQ redox signals are thus translated into kinase on/off states by CSK, although the precise mechanism of electron transfer from PQ to the Fe-S cluster remains under investigation. This redox-sensitive mechanism is conserved from cyanobacteria Hik2 through many algae to land plants, illustrating an ancient regulatory strategy.

== Transcriptional regulation ==
The transcription of chloroplast genes involved in photosynthetic electron transport especially those encoding photosystem reaction center proteins is regulated by CSK through its kinase activity. In wild like plants, changes in light quality that modify PQ redox status lead to appropriate transcriptional adjustments. For example, regulation of the psaA gene encoding a PSI reaction center subunit. In CSK mutants, these redox dependent transcriptional responses fail, demonstrating that CSK is required for maintaining photosystem equilibrium. CSK helps preserve the balance between PSI and PSII by adjusting gene expression according to electron transport status, maximizing photosynthetic efficiency and protecting against photo damage under changing environmental conditions.

== CoRR Hypothesis ==
CSK is a prediction of the CoRR Hypothesis for genes in organelles CSK is intrinsic to chloroplasts, targeted to chloroplast genes, and may have been required for the retention, in evolution, of chloroplast DNA. CSK also exemplifies the CoRR (Co-location for redox regulation) principle, which proposes that chloroplast and mitochondrial genomes persist because redox sensitive gene products must be regulated where they function. CSK provides a direct molecular link between the redox state of the photosynthetic electron transport chain and transcriptional regulation of chloroplast genes. Its presence and function support a mechanistic explanation for why certain genes remain encoded in the chloroplast genome. Their expression must respond rapidly, locally, and directly to redox changes occurring in the organelle membrane system. Through this interface between electron flow and gene expression, CSK demonstrates evolutionary continuity from the cyanobacteria endosymbiont to the modern chloroplast and represents a central regulatory node enabling plants, algae, and cyanobacteria to adapt their photosynthetic machinery to fluctuating environments.

== Evolutionary divergence of CSK signaling mechanisms ==
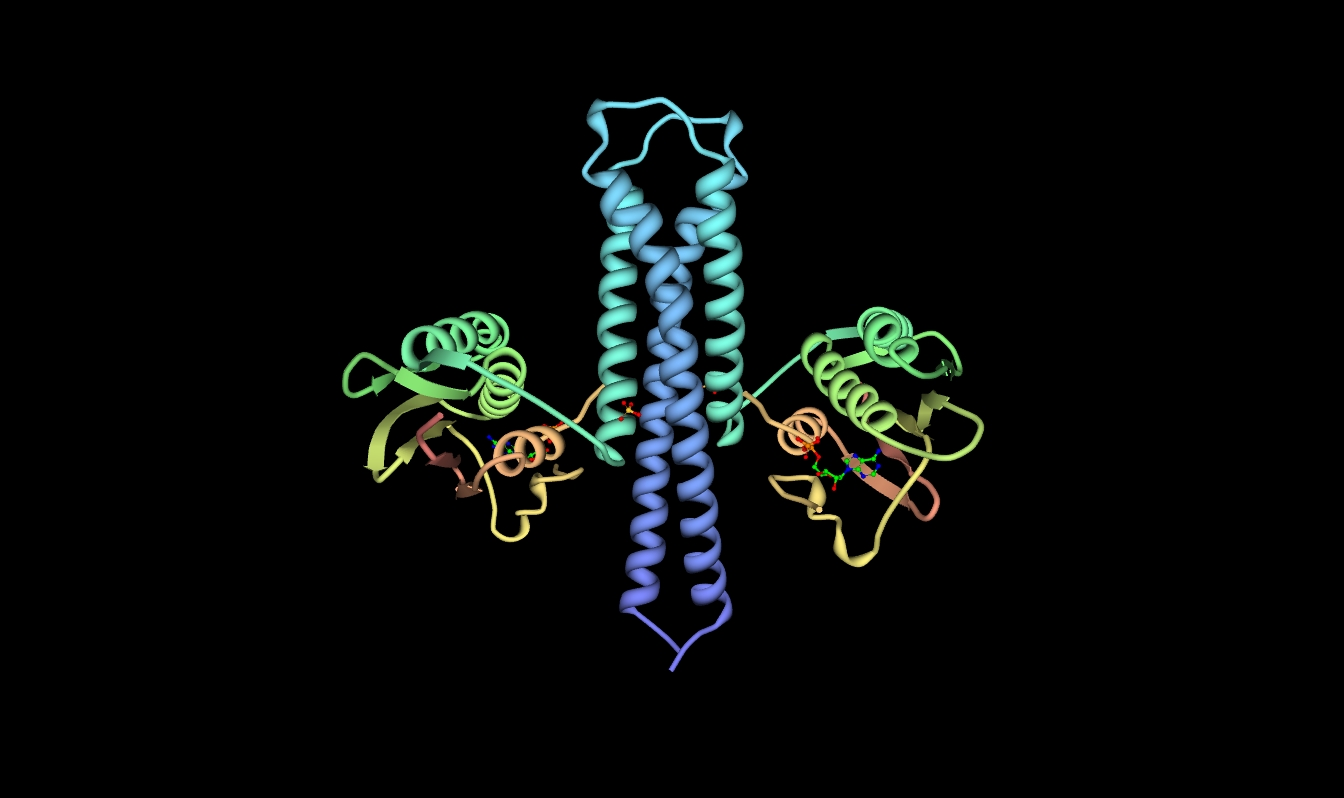
CSK is a type of histidine kinase (HK) which is a sensor protein

In cyanobacteria and non-green algae, it is a histidine kinase that work by autophosphorylation on a conserved histidine residue, then in turn passing the phosphoryl group to Rre1 and Rppa. These components are not found in green plants, where CSK might work as a serine/threonine kinase passing the group to sigma factor 1 (SIG1) instead. Histidine Kinase (HK) is a sensor protein that detects changes in the environment and initiates a signaling pathway inside the cell, as commonly observed in cyanobacteria and other bacteria. This mechanism occurs in the two-component system (TCS), which includes a response regulator (RR). HK serves as the signal detector and initiates the chemical switch, while the RR executes the cellular response. When HK uses ATP to phosphorylate its own conserved histidine residue in a process called autophosphorylation, it begins a phosphorylation cycle in response to a stimulus. The phosphate is then transferred from the histidine on HK to a conserved aspartate on the RR, activating the regulator. Some HKs also function as phosphatase, removing the phosphate from the RR to terminate the response.
