= IGAA =

IGAA may refer to:

- Israel Government Advertising Agency – the Israeli government's central public advertising bureau, also known as Lapam
- IgaA – a bacterial membrane protein (intracellular growth attenuator A) involved in regulating stress response pathways
