= ATPIF1 =

Protein-coding gene in humans

ATP5IF1

Identifiers
- Aliases: ATP5IF1, ATPI, ATPIP, IP, ATPase inhibitory factor 1, ATP synthase inhibitory factor subunit 1, ATPIF1
- External IDs: OMIM: 614981; MGI: 1196457; GeneCards: ATP5IF1

Gene location (Human)
Chr.	Chromosome 1 (human)
Band	1p35.3	Start	28,236,109 bp
Band	1p35.3	End	28,246,906 bp

Gene location (Mouse)
Chr.	Chromosome 4 (mouse)
Band	4|4 D2.3	Start	132,257,866 bp
Band	4|4 D2.3	End	132,260,970 bp
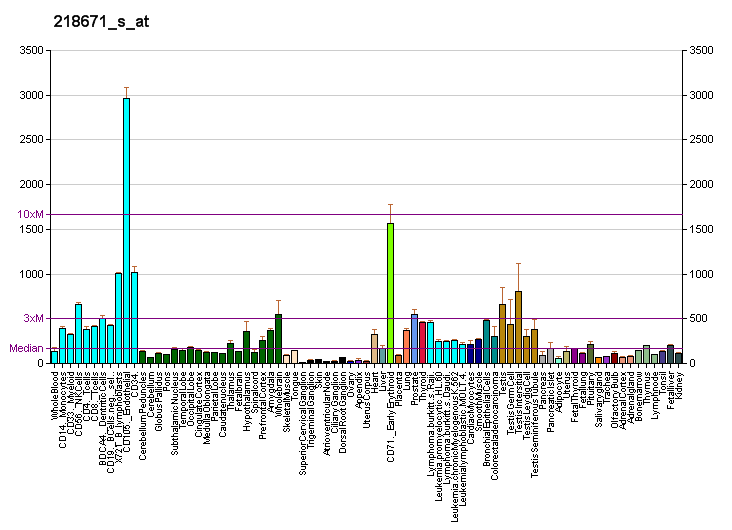
RNA expression pattern
Bgee	Human / Mouse (ortholog); Top expressed in: left testis; apex of heart; right testis; Brodmann area 9; prefrontal cortex; mucosa of transverse colon; superior frontal gyrus; primary visual cortex; olfactory zone of nasal mucosa; right auricle of heart / Top expressed in: Paneth cell; epithelium of small intestine; atrium; Ileal epithelium; external carotid artery; migratory enteric neural crest cell; proximal tubule; right kidney; internal carotid artery; medial vestibular nucleus; More reference expression data
BioGPS	More reference expression data
Gene ontology
Molecular function	5-formyltetrahydrofolate cyclo-ligase activity; enzyme inhibitor activity; protein homodimerization activity; ATPase binding; calmodulin binding; ATPase inhibitor activity; angiostatin binding; enzyme binding; mitochondrial proton-transporting ATP synthase complex binding
Cellular component	mitochondrial proton-transporting ATP synthase complex; cell surface; mitochondrion
Biological process	regulation of ATP metabolic process; positive regulation of mitochondrial outer membrane permeabilization involved in apoptotic signaling pathway; negative regulation of ATP-dependent activity; tetrahydrofolate interconversion; positive regulation of proteolysis involved in cellular protein catabolic process; negative regulation of hydrolase activity; generation of precursor metabolites and energy; reactive oxygen species metabolic process; negative regulation of endothelial cell proliferation; heme biosynthetic process; regulation of protein targeting to mitochondrion; angiogenesis; erythrocyte differentiation; mitochondrial depolarization; protein homooligomerization; protein homotetramerization; folic acid-containing compound biosynthetic process; positive regulation of autophagy of mitochondrion in response to mitochondrial depolarization
Sources:Amigo / QuickGO
Orthologs
Databases	NCBI: entry; OMA: entry
Species	Human	Mouse
Entrez	93974	11983
Ensembl	ENSG00000130770; ENSG00000285390	ENSMUSG00000054428
UniProt	Q9UII2	O35143
RefSeq (mRNA)	NM_178191; NM_016311; NM_178190	NM_007512
RefSeq (protein)	NP_057395; NP_835497; NP_835498	NP_031538
Location (UCSC)	Chr 1: 28.24 – 28.25 Mb	Chr 4: 132.26 – 132.26 Mb
PubMed search
- Wikidata
View/Edit Human	View/Edit Mouse

ATPase inhibitor, mitochondrial is an enzyme that in humans is encoded by the ATP5IF1 gene (previously ATPIF1).

This gene encodes a mitochondrial ATPase inhibitor. Alternative splicing occurs at this locus and three transcript variants encoding distinct isoforms have been identified.

It prevents ATPase from switching to ATP hydrolysis during collapse of the electrochemical gradient, for example during oxygen deprivation ATP synthase inhibitor forms a one-to-one complex with the F1 ATPase, possibly by binding at the alpha-beta interface. It is thought to inhibit ATP synthesis by preventing the release of ATP. The inhibitor has two oligomeric states, dimer (the active state) and tetramer. At low pH, the inhibitor forms a dimer via antiparallel coiled coil interactions between the C-terminal regions of two monomers. At high pH, the inhibitor forms tetramers and higher oligomers by coiled coil interactions involving the N terminus and inhibitory region, thus preventing the inhibitory activity.

Mitochondrial ATPase inhibitor, IATP
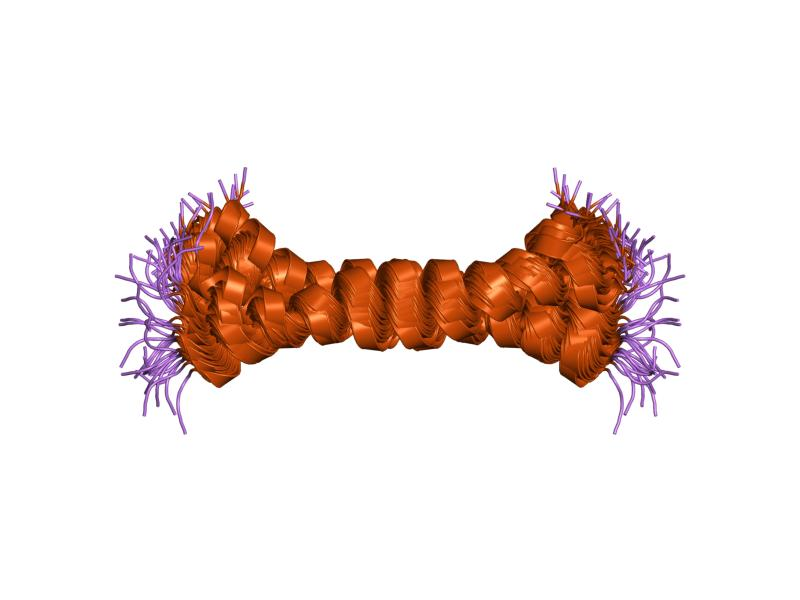
- c-terminal coiled-coil domain from bovine if1

Identifiers
- Symbol: IATP
- Pfam: PF04568
- InterPro: IPR007648
- SCOP2: 1hf9 / SCOPe / SUPFAM
Available protein structures:
- PDB: IPR007648 PF04568 (ECOD; PDBsum)
- AlphaFold: IPR007648; PF04568
