= Response regulator =

Protein which mediates cellular response in two-component regulatory systems

Response regulator receiver domain
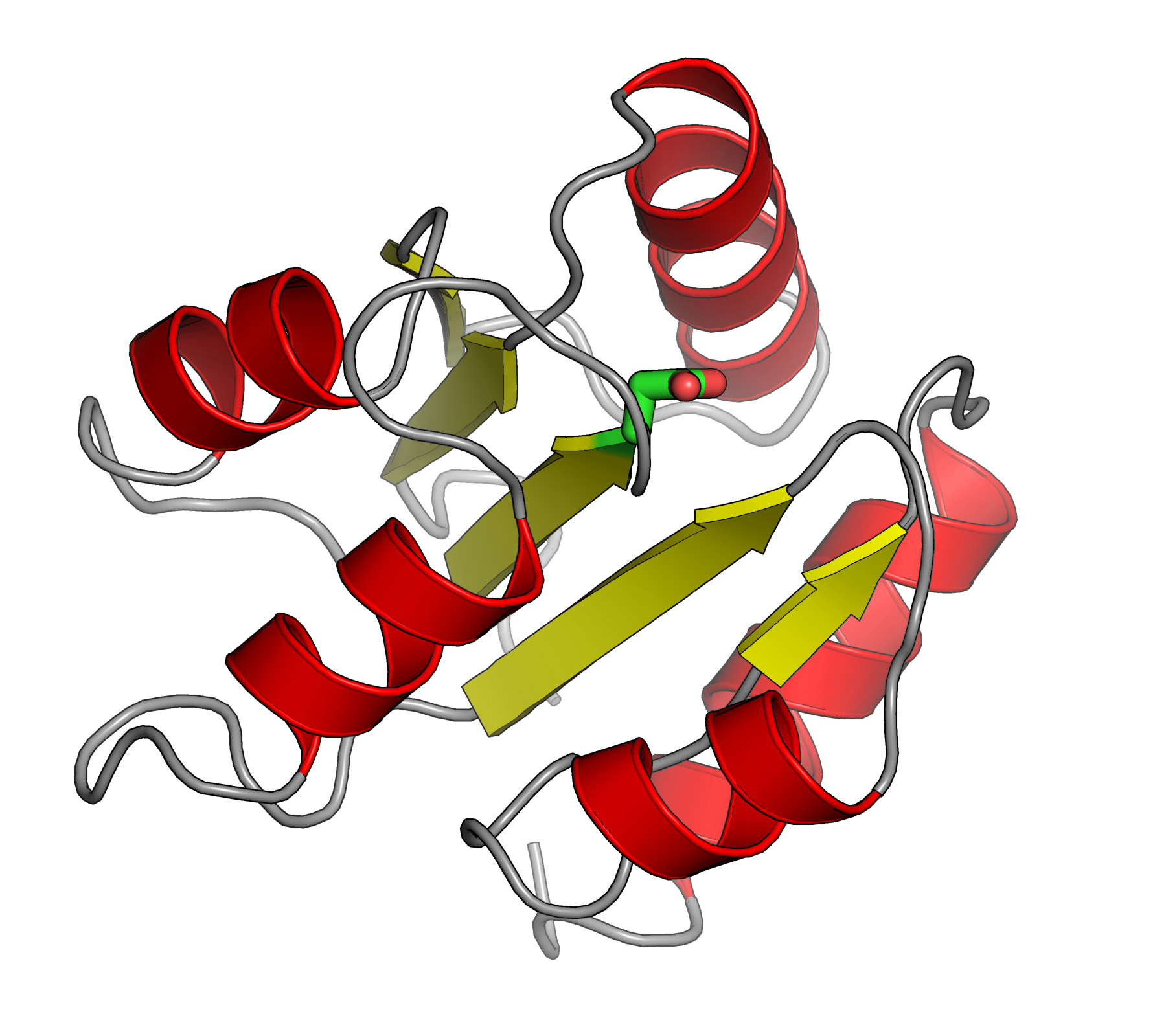
- The response regulator CheY from E. coli, with the aspartate phosphorylation site highlighted in green. From PDB: 3CHY.

Identifiers
- Symbol: Response_reg
- Pfam: PF00072
- Pfam clan: CL0304
- ECOD: 2007.1.3
- InterPro: IPR001789
- SMART: REC
- PROSITE: PDOC50110
Available protein structures:
- PDB: IPR001789 PF00072 (ECOD; PDBsum)
- AlphaFold: IPR001789; PF00072

In molecular biology, a response regulator is a protein that mediates a cell's response to changes in its environment as part of a two-component regulatory system. Response regulators are coupled to specific histidine kinases which serve as sensors of environmental changes. Response regulators and histidine kinases are two of the most common gene families in bacteria, where two-component signaling systems are very common; they also appear much more rarely in the genomes of some archaea, yeasts, filamentous fungi, and plants. Two-component systems are not found in metazoans.

== Function ==
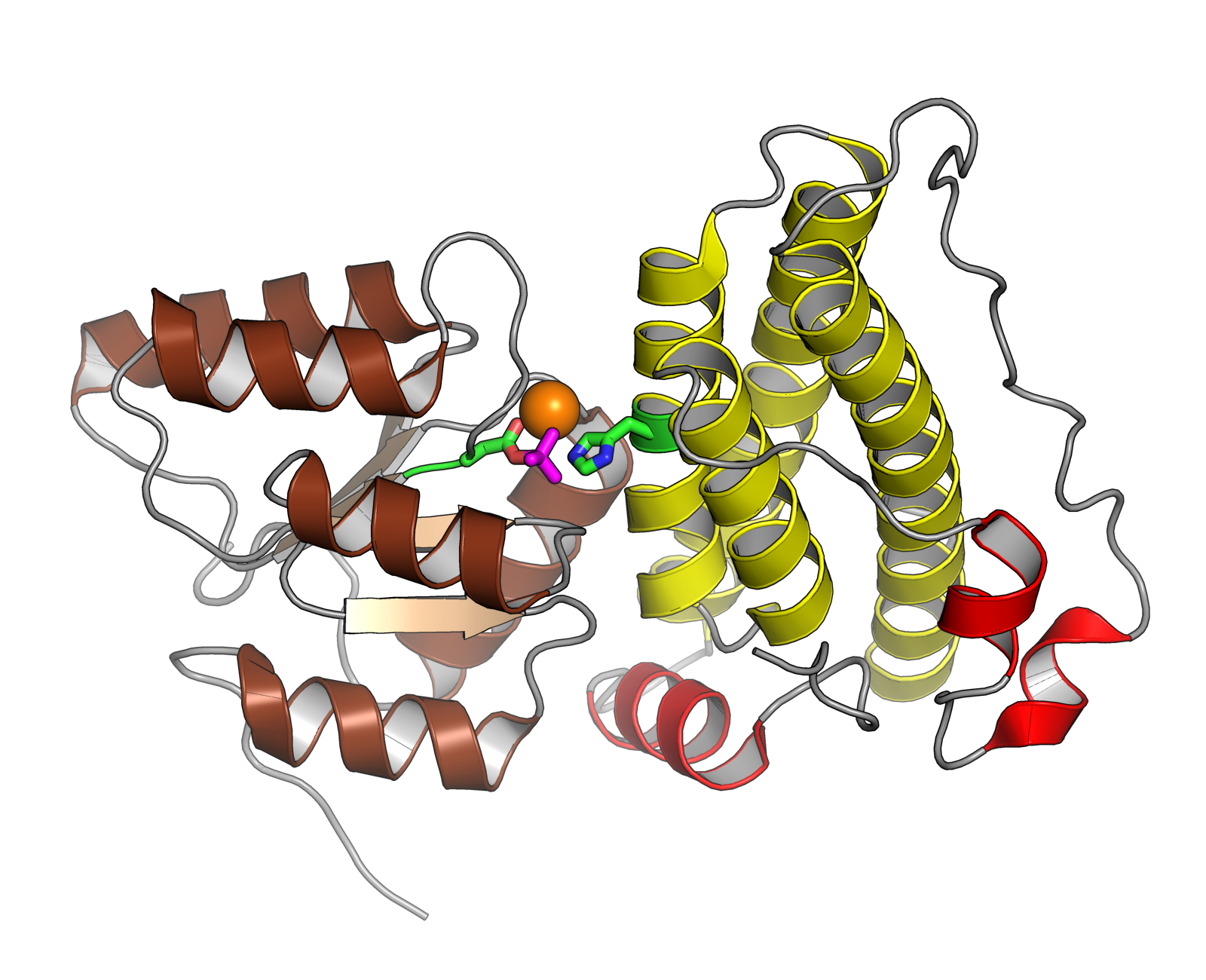
The crystal structure of the yeast histidine phosphotransfer protein Ypd1 in complex with the response regulator Sln1. Ypd1 appears on the right with the conserved four-helical bundle in yellow and variable helices in red. Sln1 appears on the left with beta sheets in tan and helices in brown. The key residues - Asp from Sln1 and His from Ypd1 - are highlighted with green sticks. A bound magnesium ion is shown as an orange sphere and beryllium trifluoride, a phosphoryl analog, is shown in pink. From PDB: 2R25.

Response regulator proteins typically consist of a receiver domain and one or more effector domains, although in some cases they possess only a receiver domain and exert their effects through protein-protein interactions. In two-component signaling, a histidine kinase responds to environmental changes by autophosphorylation on a histidine residue, following which the response regulator receiver domain catalyzes transfer of the phosphate group to its own recipient aspartate residue. This induces a conformational change that alters the function of the effector domains, usually resulting in increased transcription of target genes. The mechanisms by which this occurs are diverse and include allosteric activation of the effector domain or oligomerization of phosphorylated response regulators. In a common variation on this theme, called a phosphorelay, a hybrid histidine kinase possesses its own receiver domain, and a histidine phosphotransfer protein performs the final transfer to a response regulator.

In many cases, histidine kinases are bifunctional and also serve as phosphatases, catalyzing the removal of phosphate from response regulator aspartate residues, such that the signal transduced by the response regulator reflects the balance between kinase and phosphatase activity. Many response regulators are also capable of autodephosphorylation, which occurs on a wide range of time scales. In addition, phosphoaspartate is relatively chemically unstable and may be hydrolyzed non-enzymatically.

Histidine kinases are highly specific for their cognate response regulators; there is very little cross-talk between different two-component signaling systems in the same cell.

== Classification ==
Response regulators can be divided into at least three broad classes, based on the features of effector domains: regulators with a DNA-binding effector domain, regulators with an enzymatic effector domain, and single-domain response regulators. More comprehensive classifications based on more detailed analysis of domain architecture are possible. Beyond these broad categorizations, there are response regulators with other types of effector domains, including RNA-binding effector domains.

Regulators with a DNA-binding effector domain are the most common response regulators, and have direct impacts on transcription. They tend to interact with their cognate regulators at an N-terminus receiver domain, and contain the DNA-binding effector towards the C-terminus. Once phosphorylated at the receiver domain, the response regulator dimerizes, gains enhanced DNA binding capacity and acts as a transcription factor. The architecture of DNA binding domains are characterized as being variations on helix-turn-helix motifs. One variation, found on the response regulator OmpR of the EnvZ/OmpR two-component system and other OmpR-like response regulators, is a "winged helix" architecture. OmpR-like response regulators are the largest group of response regulators and the winged helix motif is widespread. Other subtypes of DNA-binding response regulators include FixJ-like and NtrC-like regulators. DNA-binding response regulators are involved in various uptake processes, including nitrate/nitrite (NarL, found in most prokaryotes).

The second class of multidomain response regulators are those with enzymatic effector domains. These response regulators can participate in signal transduction, and generate secondary messenger molecules. Examples include the chemotaxis regulator CheB, with a methylesterase domain that is inhibited when the response regulator is in the inactive unphosphorylated conformation. Other enzymatic response regulators include c-di-GMP phosphodiesterases (e.g. VieA in V. cholerae), protein phosphatases and histidine kinases.

A relatively small number of response regulators, single-domain response regulators, only contain a receiver domain, relying on protein-protein interactions to exert their downstream biological effects. The receiver domain undergoes a conformational change as it interacts with an autophosphorylated histidine kinase, and consequently, the response regulator can initiate further reactions along a signaling cascade. Prominent examples include the chemotaxis regulator CheY, which interacts with flagellar motor proteins directly in its phosphorylated state.

Sequencing has so far shown that the distinct classes of response regulators are unevenly distributed throughout various taxa, including across domains. While response regulators with DNA-binding domains are the most common in bacteria, single-domain response regulators are more common in archaea, with other major classes of response regulators seemingly absent from archaeal genomes.

== Evolution ==
The number of two-component systems present in a bacterial genome is highly correlated with genome size as well as ecological niche; bacteria that occupy niches with frequent environmental fluctuations possess more histidine kinases and response regulators. New two-component systems may arise by gene duplication or by lateral gene transfer, and the relative rates of each process vary dramatically across bacterial species. In most cases, response regulator genes are located in the same operon as their cognate histidine kinase; lateral gene transfers are more likely to preserve operon structure than gene duplications. The small number of two-component systems present in eukaryotes most likely arose by lateral gene transfer from endosymbiotic organelles; in particular, those present in plants likely derive from chloroplasts.
