= EnvZ/OmpR two-component system =

Bacterial regulatory system

Regulation of Porin genes

EnvZ/OmpR is a two-component regulatory system widely distributed in bacteria and particularly well characterized in Escherichia coli. Its function is in osmoregulation, responding to changes in environmental osmolality by regulating the expression of the outer membrane porins OmpF and OmpC. EnvZ is a histidine kinase which also possesses a cytoplasmic osmosensory domain, and OmpR is its corresponding response regulator protein.

== Overview ==
EnvZ is a sensor-transmitter that spans the inner cytoplasmic membrane and has historically been divided into two domains, the sensory and the transmitter domain. The protein is composed of a short N-terminal tail in the periplasm, two transmembrane regions with an intervening periplasmic loop, and a cytoplasmic domain containing the autophosphorylated histidine residue, which is located in a dimeric four-helix bundle. Variations in osmolality trigger conformational changes in EnvZ which have been localized to the cytoplasmic four-helix bundle and which effects phosphoryl transfer to OmpR. Upon phosphorylation, OmpR becomes an active dimer that exhibits enhanced DNA-binding ability specific for both the ompC and ompF genes. The signaling cascade can be elucidated as follows:

1. Activation of the inner membrane sensor histidine kinase EnvZ,
2. Autophosphorylation of EnvZ at His243,
3. Phosphate transfer to OmpR at Asp 55,
4. Binding of OmpR-P to upstream sites on the ompF and ompC porin promoters to differentially modulate their transcription.
5. Dephosphorylation of OmpR-P via the phosphatase function of EnvZ.

ompF and ompC are expressed at all times at constant levels; however, the individual porins OmpF and OmpC are present in various relative abundances based on medium osmolarity. Also, the amount of OmpF and OmpC are each controlled by a variety of mechanisms; for example, synthesis of OmpF is also repressed by high temperature. Likewise, the EnvZ-OmpR pair is involved in tripeptide permease system that is completely free of osmotic control. However, the control of EnvZ-OmpR over OmpF and OmpC is a significant mechanism.

== Low osmolarity response ==
When medium osmolarity is low, EnvZ exhibits comparatively low kinase activity (i.e., high phosphatase activity) towards OmpR. Hence the amount of the phosphorylated form of OmpR in cells is relatively small. In this particular situation, the OmpR-P complex binds cooperatively to F1, F2 and F3 activator sites of ompF gene and upregulates its transcription. These sites have high relative affinity for OmpR-P complex as compared to the C1, C2 and C3 activator sites of ompC. Therefore transcription levels of ompC is less as compared to ompF under low osmolarity condition. This phenomenon has been attributed to the fact that OmpF has a larger pore diameter (1.12 nm) than OmpC (1.08 nm) which results in a 10-fold faster diffusion rate that provides a selective advantage at low osmolarity to rapidly scavenge scarce nutrients.

== High osmolarity response ==
In the event of high medium osmolarity, EnvZ actively undergoes auto-phosphorylation and then efficiently transfers its phosphoryl groups to the N-terminal receiver domain of OmpR through EnvZ-OmpR complex formation. As the number of phosphorylated OmpR protein molecules increases, two events occur: OmpR binds not only to the high affinity binding sites upstream of the ompF promoter but also to the one low affinity-binding site. Binding to this low affinity site results in repression of ompF gene. Further, OmpR binds to the three low affinity activator sites upstream of the OmpC promoters as a result ompC gene expression is stimulated and more OmpC porin protein is expressed on outer membrane of the cell. Also, transcription of micF antisense mRNA is initiated at high medium osmolarity. micF binds to complementary sequence of ompF mRNA to block its translation. These two mechanisms ensure that there is relatively higher expression of OmpC as compared to OmpF under the conditions of high medium osmolarity.
