= Protein-histidine tele-kinase =

Class of enzymes

protein histidine tele-kinase

Identifiers
- EC no.: 2.7.13.2
- CAS no.: 99283-67-7

Databases
- IntEnz: IntEnz view
- BRENDA: BRENDA entry
- ExPASy: NiceZyme view
- KEGG: KEGG entry
- MetaCyc: metabolic pathway
- PRIAM: profile
- PDB structures: RCSB PDB PDBe PDBsum
- Gene Ontology: AmiGO / QuickGO
Search
- PMC: articles
- PubMed: articles
- NCBI: proteins

In enzymology, a protein-histidine tele-kinase (EC 2.7.13.2) is an enzyme that catalyzes the chemical reaction

ATP + protein L-histidine $\rightleftharpoons$ ADP + protein N^{τ}-phospho-L-histidine

Thus, the two substrates of this enzyme are ATP and protein L-histidine, whereas its two products are ADP and protein Ntau-phospho-L-histidine.

This enzyme belongs to the family of transferases, specifically those transferring a phosphate group to the sidechain of histidine residues in proteins (protein-histidine kinases). The systematic name of this enzyme class is ATP:protein-L-histidine Ntau-phosphotransferase. Other names in common use include ATP:protein-L-histidine N-tele-phosphotransferase, histidine kinase, histidine protein kinase, protein histidine kinase, protein kinase (histidine), and HK3.
