= IgaA =

Bacterial regulatory protein involved in envelope stress response

Identifiers
- Symbol: IgaA
- UniProt: P75962
Search for
- Structures: Swiss-model
- Domains: InterPro

IgaA (intracellular growth attenuator A) is a conserved bacterial membrane protein involved in the negative regulation of the Rcs phosphorelay system, a signaling pathway that controls envelope stress responses in many Gram-negative bacteria. The protein is essential for bacterial viability in several species, including Salmonella enterica, and plays a key role in modulating growth and virulence.

== Function ==
IgaA is a multi-pass inner membrane protein that suppresses activation of the RcsCDB phosphorelay system under non-stress conditions. When functioning properly, IgaA prevents unnecessary activation of envelope stress responses, helping maintain homeostasis and prevent toxic overexpression of capsular polysaccharides and other surface components.

Loss-of-function mutations in igaA lead to constitutive activation of Rcs signaling, resulting in defects in cell division, envelope structure, and motility, and in some cases a reduction in virulence.

== Structure ==
IgaA typically contains several transmembrane domains and a cytoplasmic tail that may interact with downstream regulators. It is classified under the Pfam protein family Pfam PF07095.

== Biological significance ==
IgaA is essential for intracellular survival and growth in host cells in some pathogenic bacteria. Its role in virulence regulation makes it a potential target for antibacterial strategies aimed at disabling stress adaptation mechanisms.

== Homologs ==
Orthologs of IgaA have been identified in a wide range of Enterobacteriaceae species, including Escherichia coli, Yersinia pestis, and Shigella flexneri.

== Bibliography ==
=== References ===
- Domínguez-Bernal, Gustavo [at Wikidata] (2004). "Repression of the RcsC-YojN-RcsB Phosphorelay by the IgaA Protein is a Requisite for Salmonella Virulence". Molecular Microbiology. 53 (5): 1437–1449. doi:10.1111/j.1365-2958.2004.04203.x. PMID 15306020.
- "Pfam: PF07095 – IgaA". Pfam.
