= Antiparallel (biochemistry) =

Term in biochemistry

In biochemistry, two biopolymers are antiparallel if they run parallel to each other but with opposite directionality (alignments). An example is the two complementary strands of a DNA double helix, which run in opposite directions alongside each other.

== Nucleic acids ==
Nucleic acid molecules have a phosphoryl (5') end and a hydroxyl (3') end. This notation follows from organic chemistry nomenclature, and can be used to define the movement of enzymes such as DNA polymerases relative to the DNA strand in a non-arbitrary manner.

=== G-quadruplexes ===
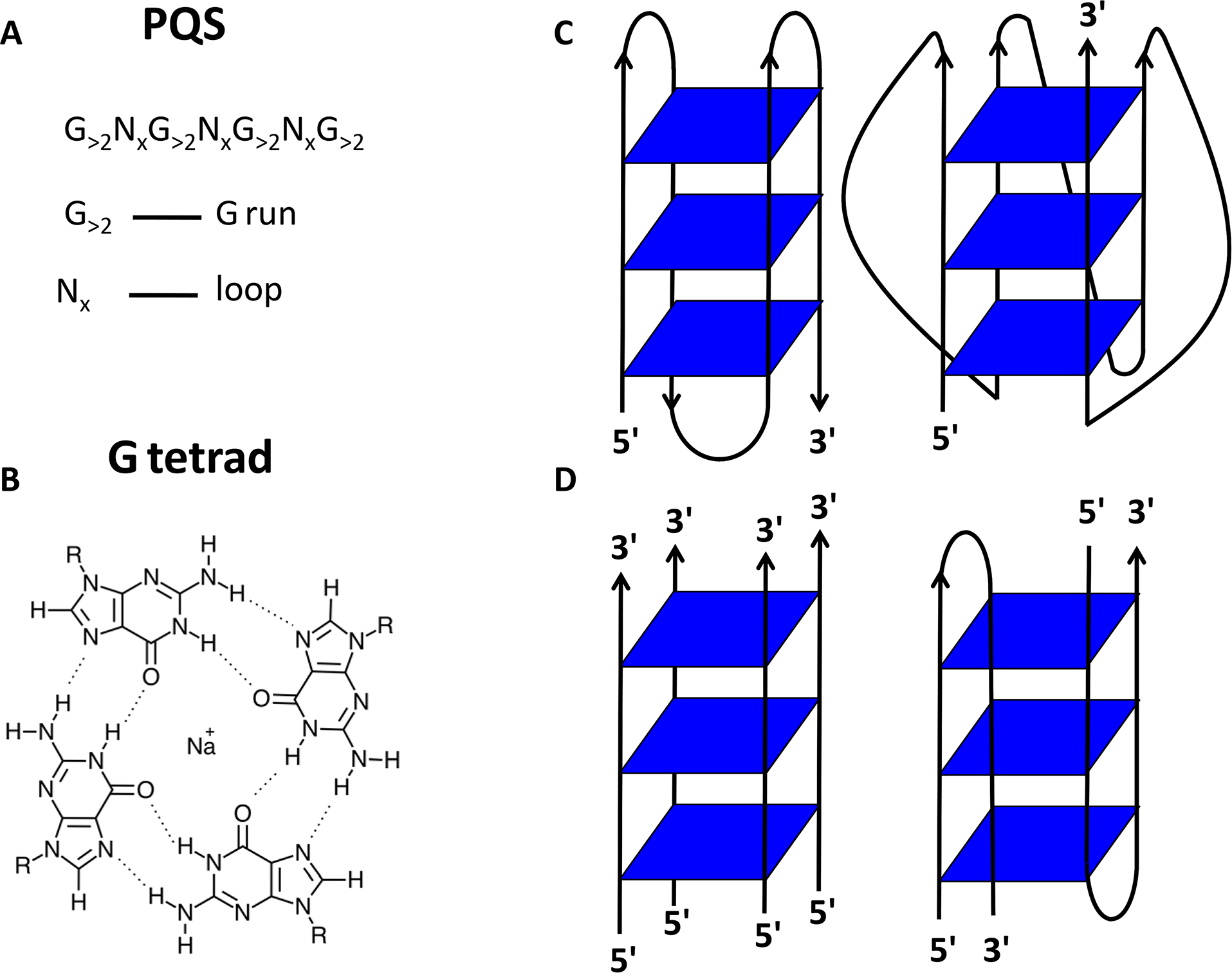
The different types of topologies in G-quadruplex, propeller, lateral, and diagonal.

G-quadruplexes, also known as G4 DNA are secondary structures found in nucleic acids that are rich in guanine. These structures are normally located at the telomeres (the ends of the chromosomes). The G-quadruplex can either be parallel or antiparallel depending on the loop configuration, which is a component of the structure. If all the DNA strands run in the same direction, it is termed to be a parallel quadruplex, and is known as a strand-reversal/propeller, connecting adjacent parallel strands. If one or more of the DNA strands run in opposite direction, it is termed as an anti-parallel quadruplex, and can either be in a form of a lateral/edgewise, connecting adjacent anti-parallel strands, or a diagonal, joining two diagonally opposite strands. The structure of these G-quadruplexes can be determined by a cation.

=== DNA replication ===
In DNA, the 5' carbon is located at the top of the leading strand, and the 3' carbon is located at the lower section of the lagging strand. The nucleic acid sequences are complementary and parallel, but they go in opposite directions, hence the antiparallel designation. The antiparallel structure of DNA is important in DNA replication because it replicates the leading strand one way and the lagging strand the other way. During DNA replication, the leading strand is replicated continuously whereas the lagging strand is replicated in segments known as Okazaki fragments.

==== Anti-parallelism in biochemistry ====
The importance of an antiparallel DNA double helix structure is because of its hydrogen bonding between the complementary nitrogenous base pairs. If the DNA structure were to be parallel, the hydrogen bonding would not be possible, as the base pairs would not be paired in the known way. The four base pairs are: adenine, guanine, cytosine, and thymine, where adenine complements thymine, and guanine complements cytosine. Transcription would be another problem if the DNA structure were to be parallel, making no sense of the information being read from the DNA. This would further lead to the production of incorrect proteins.

== Polypeptides ==
Polypeptides have an N-terminus and a C-terminus, which refer to the ends of the polymer in a way that reflects the direction in which the polymer was synthesized. The chronological sequence of each amino acid sub-unit is the basis for directionality notation in polypeptides; a given protein can be represented as its set of unique amino acid abbreviations within an N-terminus and a C-terminus.

=== Beta sheet ===
Antiparallel and parallel beta sheet

Many proteins may adopt a beta sheet as part of their secondary structure. In beta sheets, sections of a single polypeptide may run side-by-side and antiparallel to each other, to allow for hydrogen bonding between their backbone chains. Beta sheets can also be either a parallel or anti-parallel secondary structure. However, an anti-parallel beta sheet is significantly more stable than a parallel structure due to their well aligned H-bonds, which are at a 90° angle.
