= Phosphoryl group =

Group consisting of phosphorus and oxygen

A phosphoryl group is a trivalent >P(=O)− group, consisting of a phosphorus atom (symbol P) and an oxygen atom (symbol O), where the three free valencies are on the phosphorus atom. While commonly depicted as possessing a double bond (P=O) the bonding is in fact non-classical.

Despite that, the meaning of the term "phosphoryl" varies, depending on the branch of scientific discipline. For example, in biology, biochemistry and biomedicine branches, the term "phosphoryl" refers to groups consisting of phosphorus atom attached to three oxygen atoms, with the simplified chemical formula −PO_{3} (there are several groups called "phosphoryl" in those branches, with the chemical formulas −P(=O)(−O^{−})_{2}, −P(=O)(−O^{−})(−OH), −P(=O)(−OH)_{2}, −P(=O)(−O^{−})−O−, −P(=O)(−OH)−O− and −P(=O)(−O−)_{2}). In the branches mentioned above, the "phosphoryl" and phosphate groups are sometimes abbreviated by the letter "P", or represented by a symbol of encircled letter "P". "Phosphoryl" groups are covalently bonded by a single bond to an organic molecule, phosphate group(s) or another "phosphoryl" group(s), and those groups are sp^{3} hybridized at the phosphorus atom. The term "phosphoryl" in the mentioned branches is usually used in the description of catalytic mechanisms in living organisms. The "phosphoryl" group plays a central role in phosphorylation. In biochemical reactions involving phosphate groups (e.g. adenosine triphosphate), a "phosphoryl" group is usually transferred between the substrates by the "phosphoryl transfer reactions" (see phosphorylation). Examples of molecules containing those groups in biology, biochemistry and biomedicine are adenosine monophosphate (AMP), adenosine diphosphate (ADP), adenosine triphosphate (ATP), phosphocreatine (PCr) and DNA.

Contrary to biology, biochemistry and biomedicine branches, in organic and inorganic chemistry branches, as defined by the IUPAC rules for chemical nomenclature, the correct name for the −P(=O)(−O^{−})_{2} group is not "phosphoryl", but phosphonato, and the correct name for the −P(=O)(−OH)_{2} group is phosphono, and the term phosphoryl correctly refers to the trivalent >P(=O)− group. Example of molecules containing that trivalent phosphoryl group are phosphoryl chloride (O=P(−Cl)_{3}), methylphosphonyl dichloride (O=P(−CH_{3})(−Cl)_{2}) and phosphoramide (O=P(−NH_{2})_{3}).

A phosphoryl group should not be confused with a phosphate group.

Phosphoryl, phosphonato, phosphono and phosphate groups
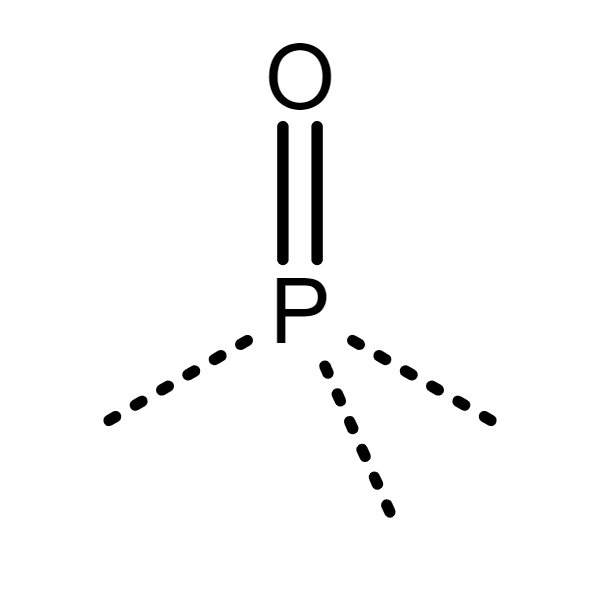
The group correctly called phosphoryl

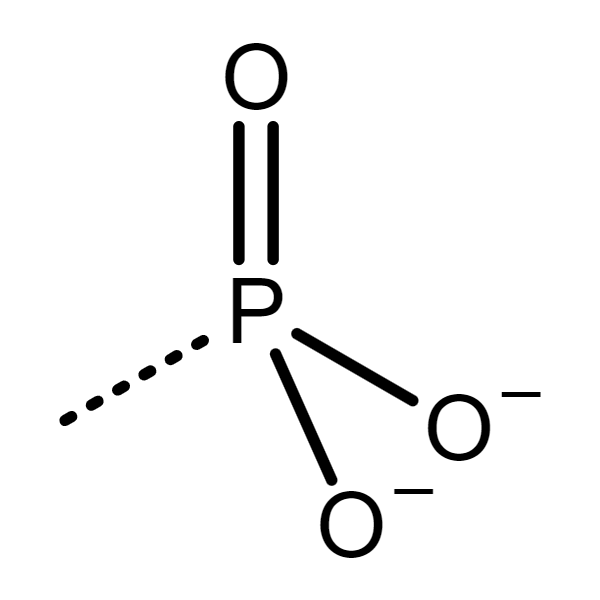
Group called "phosphoryl" in biology, biochemistry and biomedicine branches, but it is correctly called phosphonato in organic and inorganic chemistry branches

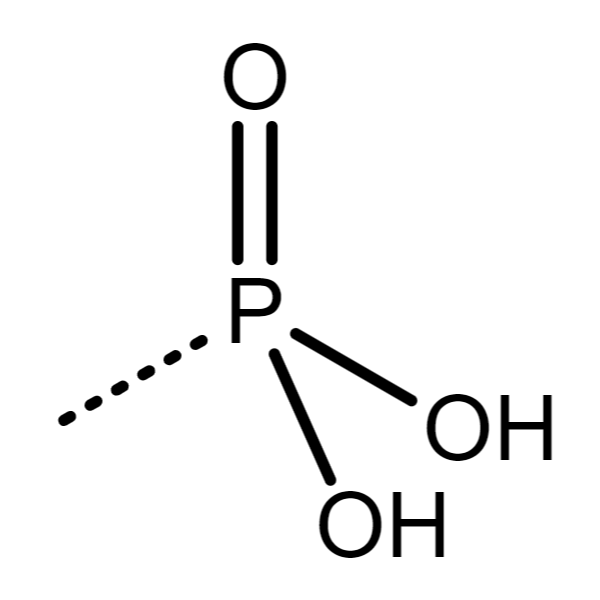
Another group called "phosphoryl" in biology, biochemistry and biomedicine branches, but it is correctly called phosphono in organic and inorganic chemistry branches

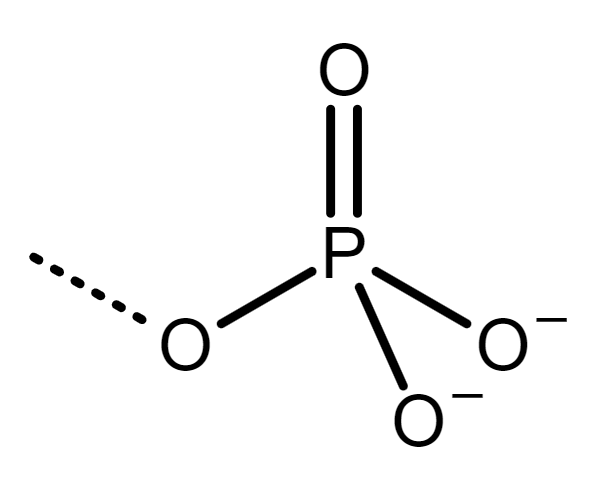
Phosphate group
