= Histidine kinase =

Family of enzymes important in cell signaling

Protein histidine kinase
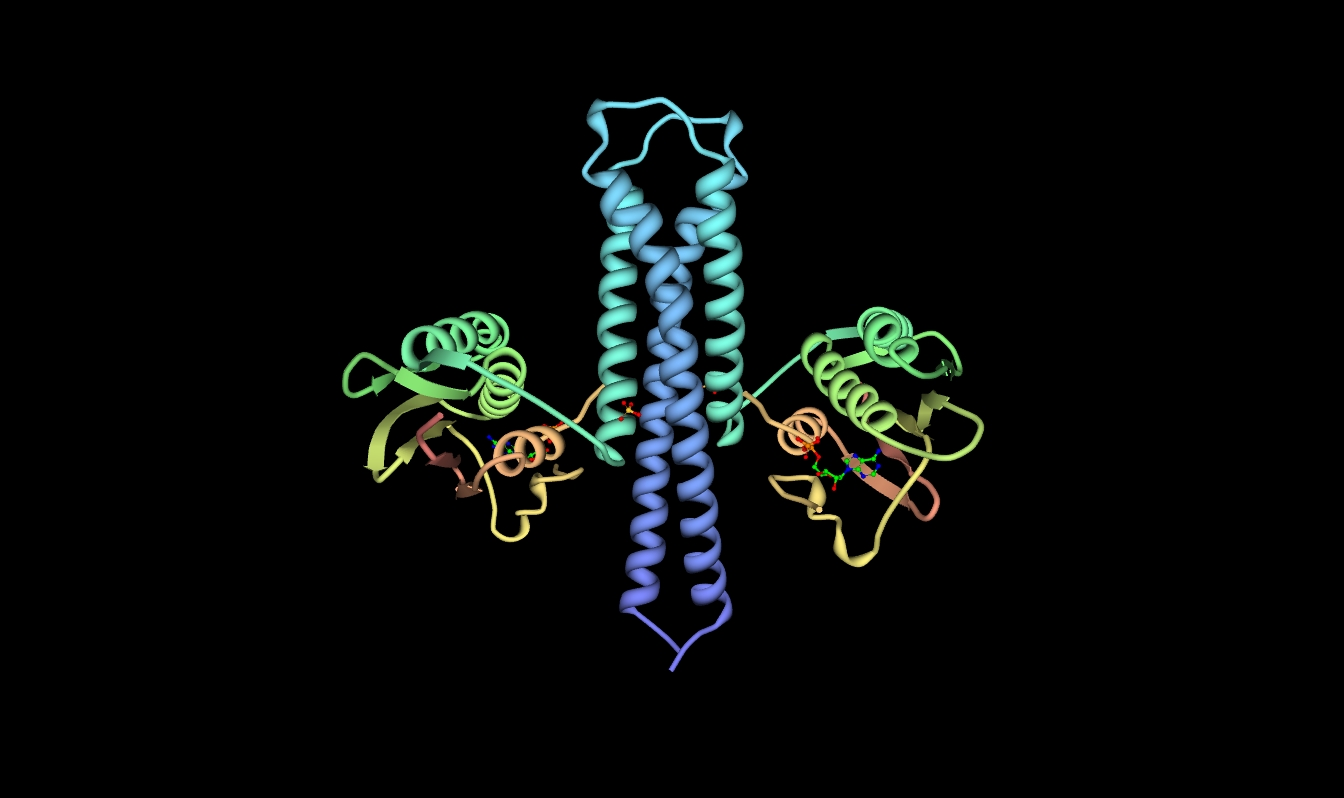
- Crystallographic structure of ATP:protein-L-histidine N-phosphotransferase based on the PDB: 2c2a coordinates.

Identifiers
- EC no.: 2.7.13.3
- CAS no.: 99283-67-7

Databases
- BRENDA: enzyme data
- ExPASy: NiceZyme view
- KEGG: enzyme entry
- MetaCyc: metabolic pathway
- Rhea: reactions
- PDB structures: RCSB PDB PDBe PDBsum
- Gene Ontology: AmiGO / QuickGO
Search
- PMC: articles
- PubMed: articles
- NCBI: proteins

Histidine kinases (HK) are multifunctional, and in non-animal kingdoms, typically transmembrane, proteins of the transferase class of enzymes that play a role in signal transduction across the cellular membrane. The vast majority of HKs are homodimers that exhibit autokinase, phosphotransfer, and phosphatase activity. HKs can act as cellular receptors for signaling molecules in a way analogous to tyrosine kinase receptors (RTK). Multifunctional receptor molecules such as HKs and RTKs typically have portions on the outside of the cell (extracellular domain) that bind to hormone- or growth factor-like molecules, portions that span the cell membrane (transmembrane domain), and portions within the cell (intracellular domain) that contain the enzymatic activity. In addition to kinase activity, the intracellular domains typically have regions that bind to a secondary effector molecule or complex of molecules that further propagate signal transduction within the cell. Distinct from other classes of protein kinases, HKs are usually parts of a two-component signal transduction mechanisms in which HK transfers a phosphate group from ATP to a histidine residue within the kinase, and then to an aspartate residue on the receiver domain of a response regulator protein (or sometimes on the kinase itself). More recently, the widespread existence of protein histidine phosphorylation distinct from that of two-component histidine kinases has been recognised in human cells. In marked contrast to Ser, Thr and Tyr phosphorylation, the analysis of phosphorylated Histidine using standard biochemical and mass spectrometric approaches is much more challenging, and special procedures and separation techniques are required for their preservation alongside classical Ser, Thr and Tyr phosphorylation on proteins isolated from human cells.

In terms of enzymology, a histidine kinase (EC 2.7.13.3, EnvZ, histidine protein kinase, protein histidine kinase, protein kinase (histidine), HK1, HP165, Sln1p) is an enzyme that catalyzes the chemical reaction

ATP + protein L-histidine $\rightleftharpoons$ ADP + protein N-phospho-L-histidine.

Thus, the two substrates of this enzyme are ATP and protein L-histidine, whereas its two products are ADP and protein N-phospho-L-histidine.

This type of enzyme is involved in signal transduction pathways upstream of many cellular processes including various metabolic, virulence, and homeostatic pathways.

== Mechanism ==
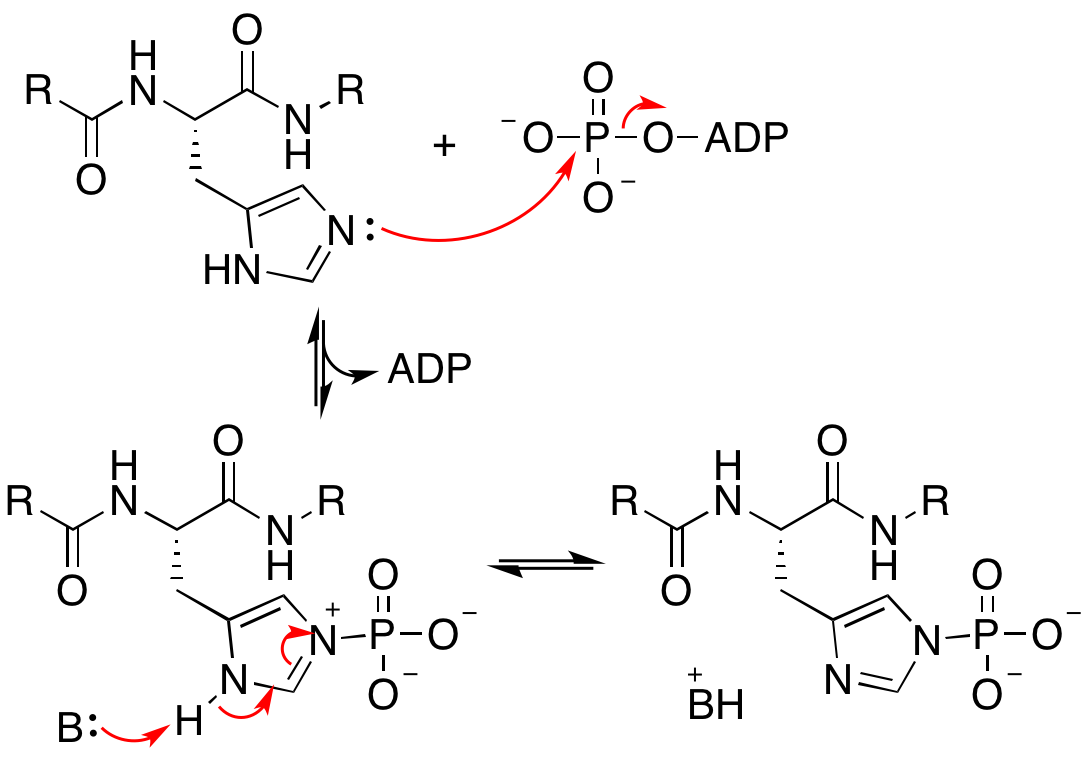
Proposed mechanism of histidine kinase, depicting phosphorylation of the tele-nitrogen. Phosphorylation of the pros-nitrogen occurs through the other histidine tautomer. B = unspecified enzymatic base.

The mechanism for the reactions catalyzed by histidine kinase have not been completely elucidated, but current evidence suggests that the catalytic domain of one dimeric unit may rotate in such a way that the ATP-binding pocket of that unit can come into contact with a particular histidine residue on the opposite unit and a nucleophilic addition results in a phosphorylated histidine.

== Structure and function ==
An HK is composed of several domains starting with a short N-terminal cytoplasmic portion connected to an extracellular sensing domain via a transmembrane α helix. A second transmembrane α helix connects the extracellular domain to the C-terminal cytoplasmic catalytic domain. HKs are known to serve roles in many different signal transduction pathways, so it is not surprising that the extracellular sensing domain is not very well conserved in the HK family. In contrast, the cytoplasmic domain tends to have high sequence homology and contains several well-known motifs. These motifs include the H, N, G1, F, and G2 boxes. The autophosphorylation H-box is contained in the N-terminal dimerization and histidine phosphotransfer (DHp) domain. In HK853-CD, crystallized from Thermotoga maritima, this domain is a helical-hairpin and is formed by residues 232-317. The histidine phosphorylation site is located at His-260. The N, G1, F and G2 boxes are contained in the C-terminal catalytic and ATP-binding (CA) domain. This domain is formed by residues 323-489 and forms a structure known as an α/β sandwich fold. This particular fold has one layer composed of a 5-stranded β sheet and the other layer is made of three α helices.

The dimeric unit is held together by a four-helix bundle, formed when the C-terminal segments of the α1 helices on each subunit interact in an antiparallel manner with both α2 helices. The stability of the dimer is aided by several interactions at the interface between the DHps of each monomer. These include hydrophobic interactions between conserved hydrophobic residues as well as two hydrogen bonds (Thr-252^{...}Glu-316’ and Arg-263^{...}Asn-307’) and one salt bridge (Lys-270^{...}Glu-303’). Further interactions are mediated via hydrogen bonds to water within a cavity inside the coiled coil and flanked by hydrophobic residues.

Single monomer. Red residue is His-260, ligand (ADP and SO_{4}) is yellow, ATP lid is magenta.

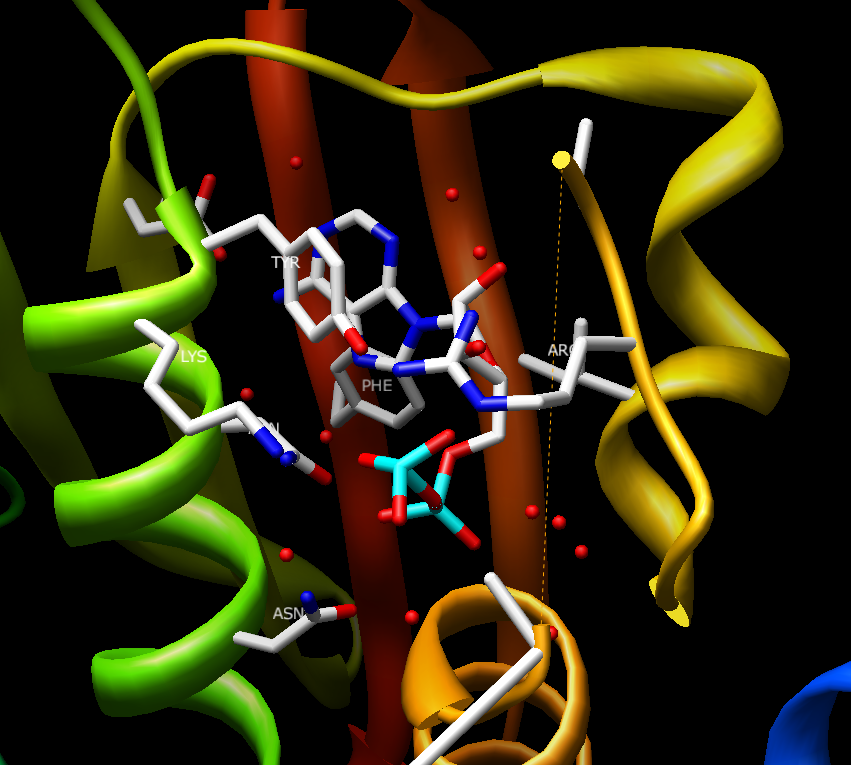
Structure and environment of HK853 ATP binding pocket. Important residues are labeled and red spheres are water molecules.

The nucleotide/ATP binding pocket is contained within the CA domain and the structural similarity of this pocket is high between most HKs. The cavity of CheA, also crystallized from T. maritima, is first formed by β sheet P4 in the rear and the sides of the cavity are formed by the four motifs mentioned earlier, the N, G1, F, and G2 boxes. The majority of the residues coming from the β sheet are hydrophobic with Asp449 being the exception. This residue is invariant and forms a hydrogen bond along with a water molecule to the adenine amine group. Three other water molecules form direct hydrogen bonds with the adenine base. A Mg^{2+} ion forms a bridge between all three phosphates and an invariant Asn residue. Finally, two more water molecules complete octahedral coordination with Mg^{2+} and are linked to Arg-408 and His-405. When the γ phosphate of ATP is destabilized, the Mg^{2+} is no longer observed due to its inability to octahedrally coordinate. Marina et al. argue that similar coordination of Mg^{2+} occurs in HK853 but that it is unobserved due to the usage of the ATP analog AMPPNP in the crystal structure. During crystallization, the analog was hydrolyzed into a product similar to ADP.

The final side of the ATP-binding pocket is conveniently named the “ATP lid.” The stability of this structure is mediated by the presence of the γ phosphate and thus the Mg^{2+} ion in the binding site. Also the presence of the nucleotide base has proved to play a significant role in stabilization of the lid in a closed conformation. The ATP lid is connected via hydrophobic residues to the rest of the protein. The γ phosphate of ATP is somewhat exposed allowing for dephosphorylation. Upon ATP binding in this pocket, it is believed that a conformational change occurs allowing the rotation of the CA domain to come into contact with the DHp of the other monomer and thus allowing the conserved His-260 to rest near the γ phosphate. The Nε of His-260 then attacks the γ phosphate of ATP in a nucleophilic addition and bumps off ADP as its leaving group.

== Role in fungal infections ==
A two-component system (TCSs), involving histidine kinase and a variable response regulator protein, may be critical to the virulence of some fungal strains such as Candida albicans, which is often responsible for causing candidiasis in immunocompromised persons. C. albicans with a deletion of CHK1, the two-component histidine kinase gene, show defects in morphogenesis and a drastic decrease in the cell’s ability to resist elimination by human neutrophils. As humans lack this two-component system, it may be a good target for anti-microbial agents in order to treat candidiasis.

== Role in bacteria infections ==
Similar to fungus, two-component systems can also be found in several persistent bacteria infections. For example, Staphylococcus aureus was reported to use SrrAB TCSs consisting of a sensor HKs (SrrB), which would transfer phosphate group to an effector response regulator (SrrA), leading to the modification of SrrA activity including gene regulation. This TCSs has been used by S. aureus in order to sense changes of environmental condition and transmit the signal to an appropriate responding system, for example, ica genes is induced by SrrAB to mediate cell assembly and biofilm formation to survive under anaerobic condition.
