= Autophosphorylation =

Post-translational modification

Fig. 1: Activation of the epidermal growth factor receptor by autophosphorylation. Adapted from Pecorino (2008)

Fig. 2: Regulation of Src-kinase by autophosphorylation. Adapted from Frame (2002)

Autophosphorylation is a type of post-translational modification of proteins. It is generally defined as the phosphorylation of the kinase by itself. In eukaryotes, this process occurs by the addition of a phosphate group to serine, threonine or tyrosine residues within protein kinases, normally to regulate the catalytic activity. Autophosphorylation may occur when a kinases' own active site catalyzes the phosphorylation reaction (cis autophosphorylation), or when another kinase of the same type provides the active site that carries out the chemistry (trans autophosphorylation). The latter often occurs when kinase molecules dimerize. In general, the phosphate groups introduced are gamma phosphates from nucleoside triphosphates, most commonly ATP.

== Function ==
Protein kinases, many of which are regulated by autophosphorylation, are vital in controlling the cellular proliferation, differentiation, metabolism, migration and survival. Mutations in the genes encoding them or their potential activators or repressors can affect any number of functions within an organism. Phosphorylation is easily reversed by phosphatases. Therefore, it is an effective method of turning 'on' and 'off' kinase activity. Because of this it is recognized as an essential process in cell signaling. Addition of a negatively charged phosphate group brings about a change in the microenvironment that may lead to attraction or repulsion of other residues or molecules. The result may be a conformational change to expose or hide catalytic or allosteric seats from the surface. If the phosphorylated residue resides within the catalytic seat itself, it may facilitate or prevent substrate binding by means of charge-interaction, or by providing or preventing complementary shapes necessary for molecular recognition. In addition, the phosphate group yields several potential areas for hydrogen-bonding or establishment of salt-bridges, of which the latter generally involves an arginine residue.

Binding of effector molecules may be affected in a similar manner if the phosphorylated residue makes part of the allosteric site. Autophosphorylation has also been reported to have an effect on the cell's ability for endocytosis and proteolysis.

== Process and structure ==
Kinases are either phosphorylated on serine and/or threonine residues, or solely on tyrosine residues. This serves as a means to classify them as either Ser/Thr- or Tyr-kinases. Several residues within the primary structure may be autophosphorylated simultaneously. The phosphoacceptors often reside within loops in the protein structure suitably termed 'activation loops'. The structures of some autophosphorylation complexes are known from crystals of protein kinases in which the phosphorylation site (Ser, Thr, or Tyr) of one monomer in the crystal is sitting in the active site of another monomer of the crystal in a manner similar to known peptide-substrate/kinase structures. The known structures include:

- Tyr phosphorylation sites in juxtamembrane regions:
  - human cKIT, Tyr568 (PDB: 1PKG)
  - human CSF1R, Tyr561 (PDB: 3LCD, homologous to cKIT site)
  - human EPHA2, Tyr594 (PDB: 4PDO, two residues after the cKIT and CSF1R sites)
- Tyr phosphorylation sites in kinase insert regions:
  - human FGFR1, Tyr583 (PDB: 3GQI)
  - human FGFR3, Tyr577 (PDB: 4K33, homologous to the FGFR1 site, domain interface identical to FGFR1 structure)
- Tyr phosphorylation sites in activation loops:
  - human IGF1R, Tyr1165 (PDB: 3D94)
  - human IGF1R, Tyr1166 (PDB: 3LVP)
  - human LCK, Tyr394 (PDB: 2PL0, homologous to the IGF1R Tyr1165 site)
- Ser/Thr phosphorylation sites in activation loops:
  - human PAK1, Thr423 (PDB: 3Q4Z, 4O0R, 4O0T, 4P90, 4ZLO, 4ZY4, 4ZY5, 4ZY6, 5DEY; the 4ZY4 and 4ZY5 structures provide complete coordinates for the substrate activation loop)
  - human IRAK4, Thr345 (PDB: 4U97, 4U9A)
- N or C terminal tails Ser/Thr phosphorylation sites:
  - C. elegans CaMKII, C-terminal tail, Thr284 (PDB: 3KK8, 3KK9)
  - human CaMKII, C-terminal tail, Thr287 (PDB: 2WEL, homologous to the C. elegans site)
  - human CLK2, N-terminal tail, Ser142 (PDB: 3NR9)

In general, the structures of the phosphorylation of internal loops involve important domain-domain contacts that have been confirmed by site-directed mutagenesis, while the phosphorylation of positions in the N or C terminal tails more than 10 amino acids away from the kinase domain do not involve important domain-domain contacts away from the substrate binding site.

== Signaling pathways and trans-autophosphorylation ==
Among a number of various molecules, Receptor Tyrosine Kinases (RTKs) play a critical role in transducing signals through a range of signaling pathways. All RTKs consists of an extracellular ligand binding region, a single transmembrane helix and a cytoplasmic region (the tyrosine kinase domain). Prior to ligand stimulation most RTKs present as a monomer on the surface of cells. Ligand binding to the extracellular domain induces dimerization. Dimerization of RTKs leads to autophosphorylation of tyrosine in the catalytic core of the dimer, and finally stimulation of the tyrosine kinase activity and cell signaling. It is thus an example of a trans-autophosphorylation reaction, where one receptor subunit of the dimer phosphorylates the other subunit.

=== Examples of RTKs which undergo autophosphorylation ===
==== Epidermal growth factor receptor ====
An example of RTKs that undergo autophosphorylation is the Epidermal Growth Factor receptor (EGFR). EGFR was the first discovered example of RTKs. Following ligand binding, a conformational change occurs in the EGFR monomers. This leads to EGFR dimerization. Dimerization brings the two receptors into close proximity. This stimulates the kinase activity of EGFR, which leads to transautophosphorylation on multiple tyrosine residues in C-terminal end of the molecule. The phosphorylated tyrosine residue can then serve as a docking site for downstream signaling proteins. (Fig. 1).

==== Insulin receptors ====
Another example is the binding of insulin to insulin receptors. Once released into the bloodstream insulin can bind to receptors on the surface of cells in muscle or other tissues. This receptor is a protein with an (αβ)2 quaternary structure. The two large α-subunits are extracellular, while the smaller β-subunits have a transmembrane domain as well as extra-and intracellular domains. In the absence of insulin, the two intracellular domains of the β subunits are relatively distant. Binding with insulin triggers a conformational change in the receptor that brings them closer together. Each β subunit intracellular domain is a tyrosine kinase that phosphorylates its partner in the receptor.

== Cancer ==
=== Src kinases ===
The Src-family kinases are examples of proteins that utilize autophosphorylation to sustain their activated states. Src kinases are involved in intracellular signaling pathways that influence cell growth and cell adhesion strength. The latter contributes to the control of cell migration. In this way, src-kinase deregulation can enhance tumor growth and invasive potential of cancer cells. The activity of src kinases is regulated by both phosphorylation and intramolecular interactions involving the SH2 and SH3 domains. The probable activation mechanism of src kinase in cancer is as follows:

1. The src kinase is kept in an inactive form through the binding of SH2 to a phosphotyrosine
2. Dephosphorylation of tyr-527 releases SH2 as well as SH3 domain.
3. Subsequent autophosphorylation of tyr-416 activates the kinase.
4. The constitutive activation of src kinase observed in cancer can be due to deletion of tyr-527, displacement of SH3 and SH2-mediated interactions by high affinity ligands with constantly autophosphorylated tyr-416.(Fig. 2).

=== Ataxia telangiectasia mutated kinase (ATM kinase) ===
ATM kinase, a member of the PI3-like family of serine/threonine kinases plays a critical role in maintaining the stability of the genome, which is of fundamental importance to the survival of all organisms. It exerts its effect by phosphorylating target proteins such as P53, MDM2 and chk2. Activation of ATM is facilitated by autophosphorylation. The inactive ATM exists as dimer, where the kinase domain of one monomer is bound to the internal domain of the other monomer, containing ser-1981. It will therefore be inaccessible to cellular substrates. In response to DNA damage, the kinase domain of one monomer phosphorylates ser-1981 of the other interacting ATM, resulting in subunit dissociation and ATM activation. The activated ATM triggers a sequence of events including cell cycle arrest which allows time for the repair of the damaged DNA. If damaged DNA is left unrepaired, it can lead to cell death or genomic instability, cancer and other pathologies.

== See also ==
- Phosphorylation
- Kinase
