= A. marina =

A. marina may refer to:

- Acaryochloris marina, a chlorophyll d containing symbiotic species of the phylum Cyanobacteria
- Amycolatopsis marina, a high-GC content bacterium species in the genus Amycolatopsis
- Aurantiacicella marina, a bacterium from the genus of Aurantiacicella
- Aureitalea marina, a bacterium from the genus of Aureitalea
- Aureivirga marina, a marine bacterium from the genus of Aureivirga
- Avicennia marina, the grey mangrove or white mangrove, a mangrove tree species

== See also ==
- Marina (disambiguation)
