= Anthony Larkum =

British plant scientist and academic

Anthony W.D. Larkum
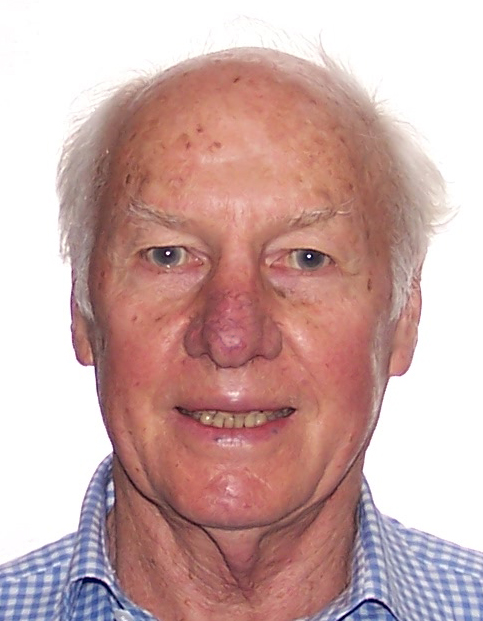
- Born: March 3, 1940 (age 86); London
- Title: Professor Emeritus of Plant Sciences
- Spouse: Hilary Larkum (m. 1963 d. 2014)
- Children: 2
- Parent(s): Fred Larkum, Vera Larkum

Academic background
- Education: Imperial College; Oxford University

Academic work
- Discipline: Plant Sciences
- Institutions: University of Sydney

Anthony William Derek Larkum is a British-Australian plant scientist and academic based in Sydney. He is professor emeritus of plant sciences at the University of Sydney and adjunct professor at the University of Technology Sydney (UTS).

Much of Larkum's research has been on marine algae, seagrasses and coral reef. He has done considerable research on photoinhibition, UV inhibition, photosynthesis and light harvesting. Since 1997, a great part of his research has been devoted to understanding the process of mass coral bleaching, more specifically the bleaching of the Great Barrier Reef. Some of his research has also studied novel cyanobacteria with far-red chlorophylls, such as Acaryochloris. He has discovered a new taxon in the seagrass genus Halophila. This is the species of Halophila from One Tree Island on the Great Barrier Reef. He has written eight books and over 250 articles.

== Biography and work ==
After completing a BSc (Special) degree from Imperial College in 1961, he conducted biochemical research with Henrik Lundegårdh at the University of Upsala, Sweden for 1 year. Then he continued his postgraduate research at Oxford University where he received his D.Phil. in 1966 for a thesis concerned with the processes of ion uptake in plant roots.

During his post-doctoral fellowship at the University of Cambridge, he was in the laboratory of Enid MacRobbie and studied the ionic status of chloroplasts. He investigated the role of compatible solutes in energy transduction in chloroplasts and wrote the paper Ionic Relations of Chloroplasts in Vivo published in Nature, showing that chloroplasts have much higher salt concentrations than the surrounding cytoplasm and that this difference is involved in energy transduction. At this time, he was also involved in developing early applications of underwater (SCUBA) techniques to plant physiology, particularly the ways in which algae harvest energy in situ. In 1968, he joined the University of Pennsylvania for a postdoctoral fellowship on energy transduction in chloroplasts.

In 1969, he moved to Sydney and joined University of Sydney as a lecturer in plant physiology, becoming associate professor of biology in 1982 and professor in 1994. Under the aegis of the Australian Academy of Science, he organized the first Fenner Environment Conference on Ultraviolent B Radiation Impacts in Canberra. The conference also set up a working party for which he was the chair to set guidelines for a proposal to International Geophysical Biological Program for work on UV-B impacts. At the same time he was appointed to the Biology Committee of the Australian Research Council; later becoming the chairman.

From 1996 until 2000, he was the deputy of School of School of Biological Sciences and also served as the director of Sydney University Biological Informatics and Technology Centre (SUBIT) from 2000 to 2004. In 2001, he became professorial fellow and later, in 2003, professor emeritus at the university. In 2009, he joined University of Technology as an adjunct professor, where he now works in the C3 Global Change Cluster.

Larkum is a member of Australian Marine Sciences Association, Australian Society of Phycology and Aquatic Botany, International Photosynthesis Society and International Coral Reef Society. He has served on the editorial boards of Aquatic Botany, Marine Biology and Oceanography, Phycologia and Trends in Plant Science. Currently he serves on the boards of Frontiers in Marine Biology and the Royal Society Interface.

== Research ==
=== Early physiological research ===
Larkum's early research focused on ion uptake in plant roots, which formed the subject of his doctoral research at the University of Oxford. He also investigated the ionic status of chloroplasts as a research fellow in the laboratory of Professor Enid MacRobbie at the University of Cambridge. This work examined the relationship between ion concentrations in chloroplasts and energy transduction across thylakoid membranes. His research on the 518-nanometre shift also investigated its potential use as a measure of membrane potential.

During this period, Larkum also became involved in the development of underwater and SCUBA techniques for studying plant physiology, particularly the ways in which algae capture and use light energy. This early work contributed to his subsequent research in marine photophysiology.

=== Photophysiology and photosynthesis ===
Larkum's research subsequently expanded into the photophysiology of algae and seagrasses. His early studies examined algal pigmentation and the relationship between pigment composition and the depth at which algae occur. He later investigated photosynthetic membranes and the properties of membrane proteins reconstituted in artificial lipid membranes. This work was carried out in collaboration with researchers at the University of Cambridge and Macquarie University.

A major later area of research was photoinhibition and the effects of ultraviolet radiation on photosynthesis. In collaboration with W. F. Wood, Larkum investigated the effects of UV-B radiation on marine algae and found that inhibition was particularly associated with photosystem II. The work showed that sublittoral algae could be affected by relatively low levels of UV-B radiation and that UV-B could penetrate to ecologically significant depths in Australian waters. Research undertaken in Antarctica in 1990 examined similar effects and their implications for marine primary productivity. A subsequent femtosecond instrument was developed to investigate the effects of UV-B radiation on the oxygen-evolving complex of photosystem II.

=== Light-harvesting systems and photosynthetic pigments ===
Larkum's work on light harvesting developed from his interest in chromatic adaptation, the ability of algae to adjust their photosynthetic pigments to the available light environment. His early studies examined the relationship between pigmentation and algal distribution and included research on the giant-celled red alga Griffithsia. Later work expanded to phytoplankton and cyanobacteria, including the photosynthetic prokaryote Prochloron, which contains chlorophyll b as well as chlorophyll a.

His research on marine cyanobacteria also identified unusual photosynthetic pigments and pigment-protein complexes. Studies of cyanobacterial symbionts associated with deep-water sponges identified phycobiliproteins containing phycourobilin, a chromophore previously associated primarily with red algae. These studies contributed to investigations of the evolutionary relationships between cyanobacteria and chloroplast-containing algae.

Larkum subsequently studied cyanobacteria containing the unusual chlorophylls d and f. His research included Acaryochloris marina, which contains chlorophyll d, and Halomicronema hongdechloris, which contains chlorophyll f.

=== Marine physiology and ecophysiology ===
Larkum pioneered the application of SCUBA techniques to algal ecology and physiology. His marine research included the productivity of kelps, sublittoral algal and seagrass communities along the New South Wales coast, photosynthesis and nutrient relations in coral reef algae, and calcification in Halimeda. His research, together with Michael Borowitzka, on Halimeda included the development of a model for the mechanism of calcification. He also investigated ionic regulation in the euryhaline alga Enteromorpha intestinalis.

=== Seagrass research ===
Larkum began research on seagrasses in 1972. His work examined photosynthesis, photorespiration, primary productivity, methods for estimating seagrass cover, pollution and the effects of oil and dispersants on seagrass growth, as well as historical changes in seagrass communities in Botany Bay.

His research contributed to environmental assessments and conservation strategies involving seagrass ecosystems in Australia. He was executive editor and a contributor to The Biology of Seagrasses, published in 1989, contributing four chapters to the volume. In 2003, he was the first editor of Seagrasses: Biology, Ecology and Conservation. He later co-edited Seagrasses of Australia: Structure, Ecology and Conservation, published by Springer in 2018.

His later work continued to examine the physiology and metabolism of seagrasses, including carbon acquisition, photosynthesis, photorespiration and responses to high light.

=== Coral reef research ===
Larkum's coral reef research began with studies of productivity and nutrient relations. His work on turf algae, or epilithic algal communities, examined their role as a source of food for herbivorous fishes. He subsequently investigated nitrogen fixation and nitrogen cycling on coral reefs and produced a comprehensive budget of nitrogen fixation for a reef system. In 1991, Larkum initiated the ENCORE (Elevated Nutrients on a Coral Reef) project in collaboration with the Great Barrier Reef Marine Park Authority. The project experimentally examined the effects of nitrogen and phosphorus enrichment on coral reef communities at One Tree Reef. It involved researchers from Australia and several other countries and investigated the effects of nutrient enrichment on algae, corals and coral reproduction.

Larkum also conducted research on coral bleaching and the photosynthetic symbionts of reef organisms. From the late 1990s, this work increasingly focused on the physiological mechanisms associated with coral bleaching and the effects of temperature and solar radiation on reef organisms.

His work on coral photophysiology also contributed to research on the photoprotective role of fluorescent pigments in corals. A 2000 paper coauthored by Larkum in Nature investigated fluorescent pigments as a mechanism of photoprotection in reef-forming corals. This work extended knowledge of “Green fluorescent protein” of the jelly fish, Aequora victoria to a range of proteins with fluorescent properties across the spectrum from blue to red, which have been used extensively in optogenetics, and for which Nobel Prizes in Physiology were awarded in 2026.

=== Stromatolites and far-red photosynthesis ===
Since 2007, Larkum has studied stromatolites at Hamelin Pool in Shark Bay, Western Australia. His research has focused particularly on cyanobacteria living within the surface layers of the stromatolites and their adaptation to the unusual light environment several millimetres beneath the surface. Larkum organised six expeditions to Shark Bay and contributed to research documenting cyanobacteria capable of using far-red wavelengths of light. The work included Halomicronema hongdechloris, containing chlorophyll f, and Acaryochloris-type marina, containing chlorophyll d. Research also documented Chroococcidiopsis containing chlorophylls a, d and f.

=== Taxonomy and algal biodiversity ===
Larkum has also carried out taxonomic work which resulted in 'A check list for the algae of Lizard Island', the discovery of several new deepwater species of algae on the Great Barrier Reef and 'A Key to the Green and Brown Algae of New South Wales' by Borowitzka, King and Larkum which was published by the Coastal Council of NSW in 1983. He discovered a new species and named it Halophila capricorni; type specimens came from One Tree Island on the Great Barrier Reef, but it is also found in New Guinea and New Caledonia waters.

=== Evolutionary and molecular studies ===
Larkum's work on Prochloron led to research in molecular biology and phylogenetics. He and his collaborators investigated genes involved in light harvesting, including the cab gene encoding a light-harvesting chlorophyll a/b protein. They were among the first researchers to clone genes from Prochloron, including atpB and atpE, generating molecular sequence data for phylogenetic analysis. His subsequent work examined the effects of nucleotide composition on phylogenetic reconstruction and contributed to the development of the log-det method for addressing compositional bias in molecular sequence comparisons. These studies were used to investigate the evolutionary relationships among Prochloron, and other chlorophyll b-containing cyanobacteria, other conventional cyanobacteria and chloroplast-containing organisms.

In 2007, Larkum, Peter J. Lockhart and C. J. Howe published “Shopping for Plastids”, which proposed an alternative model for the evolution of primary plastids. The paper examined the evolutionary histories of the major plastid lineages and challenged models based on a single origin for primary plastids.

=== Environmental and climate-related research ===
Larkum and his colleagues have intensively investigated Prochloron, in areas of gene sequencing and molecular phylogeny. In the 1990s, he and team of scientists cloned the genes of Prochloron to understand the affinities of this alga to chloroplasts of green algae and higher plants. He conducted considerable research in the evolution of Prochloron and cyanobacteria and was also involved in phylogenetic studies of cab genes in a variety of eukaryotic algae, Pavlova lutheri, diatoms and Amphidinium.

== Awards and honours ==
Larkum's honours include the Lifetime Award in Photosynthesis, awarded by the Society for Photosynthesis and Hydrogen Sustainability in St Petersburg in June 2019. He received the Society Medal in Coral Reef Research from the Australian Coral Reef Society at Heron Island in August 2010. He also received an Award for Seagrass Research at the International Seagrass Biology Workshop in Townsville in 2005.

In 2004, Larkum served as Chair of the Biology Committee of the Australian Research Council.

In 2017 Larkum was awarded an Honoured Scientist award at the 2019 meeting of the Annual Conference of Photosynthesis and Hydrogen Production, in St Petersburg, Russia.

== Bibliography ==
=== Selected papers ===
- Calcification in the green alga Halimeda: III. The sources of inorganic carbon for photosynthesis and calcification and a model of the mechanism of calcification. Journal of Experimental Botany (1976)
- An experimental analysis of factors controlling the standing crop of the epilithic algal community on a coral reef. Journal of Experimental Marine Biology and Ecology (1983)
- Light-harvesting processes in algae. Advances in botanical research (1983)
- Biology of seagrasses: a treatise on the biology of seagrasses with special reference to the Australian region. Journal of Applied Phycology (1989)
- Substitutional bias confounds inference of cyanelle origins from sequence data. Journal of Molecular Evolution (1992)
- The effect of UV-B radiation on photosynthesis and respiration of phytoplankton, benthic macroalgae and seagrasses. Photosynthesis Research (1993)
- Evolution of chlorophyll and bacteriochlorophyll: the problem of invariant sites in sequence analysis. Proceedings of the National Academy of Sciences (1996)
- Independent evolution of the prochlorophyte and green plant chlorophyll a/b light-harvesting proteins. Proceedings of the National Academy of Sciences (1996)
- Assessment of photosynthetic performance of Prochloron in Lissoclinum patella in hospite by chlorophyll fluorescence measurements. Plant and Cell Physiology (1997)
- Temperature-induced bleaching of corals begins with impairment of the CO2 fixation mechanism in zooxanthellae. Plant, Cell & Environment (1998)
- Fluorescent pigments in corals are photoprotective. Nature (2000)
- ENCORE: the effect of nutrient enrichment on coral reefs. Synthesis of results and conclusions. Marine Pollution Bulletin (2001)
- The biasing effect of compositional heterogeneity on phylogenetic estimates may be underestimated. Systematic Biology (2004)
- Ecology: a niche for cyanobacteria containing chlorophyll d. Nature (2005)
- Selection, breeding and engineering of microalgae for bioenergy and biofuel production. Trends in biotechnology (2012)

=== Books ===
- Biological Science, The Web of Life (2nd Edition) (1974)
- Biological Science, The Web of Life (3rd Edition) (1981)
- Field Guide to the Marine Plants of New South Wales (1983)
- Biology of Seagrasses (1990)
- Marine Cyanobacteria (1999)
- Photosynthesis in Algae (2003)
- Seagrasses: Biology, Ecology and Conservation (2006)
- A Natural Calling: The Life, Letters and Diaries of Charles Darwin and William Darwin Fox (2009)
- Seagrasses of Australia (Springer, 2018)
