= Underwater Association =

Marine association

- Abbreviation: UA
- Merged into: Society for Underwater Technology
- Formation: 1966; 60 years ago
- Founded at: Malta
- Dissolved: 1992; 34 years ago
- Purpose: Scientific diving
- Key people: Anthony Larkum
- Formerly called: The Underwater Association for Malta

The Underwater Association (UA) was a research association focused on the conduct of research underwater by diving scientists and archaeologists. It was established by a group of UK scientists in Malta in 1966 to assist in the organisation and publication of British diving science. Membership grew to over 400, with approximately one third joining from outside the UK. From 1972 to 1979 the UA published a Code of Practice for scientific diving. This was expanded in 1987 and 1990 to form the UNESCO Code of Practice. Membership declined in the late 1980s, and the UA merged with the Society for Underwater Technology in 1992.

== Background ==
The Underwater Association grew out of the popularity of scuba sports diving clubs in British universities in the 1950s and 60s. Diving became popular after the introduction of the first successful and safe open-circuit scuba set, the Aqua-Lung, in the 1940s, and clubs were established in many British universities from 1957 onwards. Members of these clubs, and of research institutions, used scuba diving to pursue various scientific projects under water. Some projects involved the study of diver physiology and psychology, while others made use of diving to study marine biology, underwater archaeology, geology, physics and other topics. Members of the Cambridge University Underwater Exploration Group and Imperial College London were particularly active. They ran expeditions to Malta in the early 1960s, and enjoyed close cooperation with the Royal Navy which provided compressed air and a recompression chamber. In 1965 five different scientific diving teams were active in Malta. The different teams were organised as follows: The Cambridge University Malta Expedition 1965, an undergraduate group studying diurnal behaviour in marine invertebrates (winners of the first ever Duke of Edinburgh/British Sub-Aqua Club award for diving science); and a group from Oxford University, studying mainly algae and geology. There was also a Vision Group from various institutions, studying the visibility of underwater objects and the perception of size and distance, a group led by John Woods from the Physics Department Imperial College London studying thermocline instability; and a Helium Group, led by Nic Flemming from Cambridge University, studying the psychological and ergonomic efficiency of divers breathing heliox and air at a depth of 60 m. In total, 32 divers were involved in these projects. The groups shared many facilities and a conference was organised to present the results in late 1965, with the papers published in 1966. After this publication, the group established an association as a company limited by guarantee and which was registered as a charitable organization.

== Establishment of the Underwater Association ==
The Underwater Association for Malta 1966 was established under that name in 1966 to assist in the organisation and publication of British diving science. The first organising committee consisted of John N. Lythgoe (Institute of Ophthalmology, London), John D. Woods (Physics Department, Imperial College, London), Nicholas C. Flemming (Pembroke College, Cambridge), Anthony Larkum (Botany, Cambridge), Andrew E. Dorey (Zoology, Bristol), Christopher C. "Bill" Hemmings (Fisheries Laboratory, Aberdeen). Bill Hemmings was appointed the first Chair. Subsequent Chairs were Nic Flemming, John Lythgoe and Richard Pagett. As the Association expanded and broadened its range of international recruitment, the name was shortened to the Underwater Association. After a few years the use of Malta as a central base for multiple projects was abandoned, and the Association expanded its objectives to promote underwater science at any location, attracting one third of its membership from outside the UK. The Underwater Association corresponded and collaborated with equivalent voluntary bodies in other countries, especially the American Academy of Underwater Sciences in the USA. The methods and goals of the Underwater Association helped equivalent bodies to develop in South Africa and Australia.

== Symposia and UA publications ==
The UA held its first symposium in 1965 to discuss the results of that year's expeditions. It took place in the Physics Department of Imperial College London, on 29 October. The resulting papers, and those of symposia from 1966 to 1969, were published in booklet form. The proceedings volumes were reviewed in maritime research journals for the information of other marine scientists. Woods and Lythgoe in 1971 and Drew, Lythgoe and Woods in 1976 also published books on underwater science with contributions from members of the UA and elsewhere. The Association also published a newsletter several times each year, circulated by post, which was an essential component of its success in the days before digital communications. Edward Drew and Helen Ross were newsletter editors for much of this time. Copies of most of the UA publications on the proceedings of symposia are held by the library of the National Oceanography Centre, Southampton.

== Typical publications in different disciplines ==
The Underwater Association provided a vehicle for marine scientists who used diving to pool experiences, learn different techniques, experiment with different breathing gas mixtures and diving gear, and to publish their results in a way that emphasised the effectiveness of diving, as well as the skills needed to work efficiently underwater. This achievement coexisted with routine publishing in the mainstream single-discipline refereed journals that demonstrate the high quality of the research. Published papers by Members in the Proceedings volumes and other academic journals included research on diving medicine, psychology, marine biology, fisheries, marine geology, marine physics, archaeology, and oceanographic engineering. The Underwater Association enabled many young marine scientists to develop their careers at a time when diving was not a common research method. The following selected citations illustrate some significant papers in the disciplines of Marine Physics, Psychology of perception, Geoarchaeology, Archaeology, Marine botany, Marine algae, Marine zoology, the psychology of memory in different environments, and diving physiology.

== Role in development of UK Codes of Practice for Scientific Diving ==
During the early 1970s there were increasing numbers of accidents to divers operating commercially in the North Sea oil fields. The UK Health and Safety Executive (HSE) published a consultative document on proposed new regulations for divers at work in 1978, and new statutory regulations came into force in 1981. These were updated in 1997. The Underwater Association, whose members had an accident-free safety record, published an advisory Code of Practice for Scientific Diving in 1972, which was revised and updated in 1974, after which it was adopted as the standard for the Natural Environment Research Council (NERC) and other governmental research diving organisations. This code was circulated internationally, which led to the convening of a UNESCO committee of the Intergovernmental Oceanographic Commission, whose purpose was to publish an international version, compatible with the safety laws in many countries. NERC, a UK government agency which employed marine scientists in several institutes, adopted the UA Code of Practice and co-published it through several editions (Code in references).The Royal Geographical Society Expedition Advisory Centre recommended the UA Code for use in diving research projects (Palmer).The UA Code helped in the negotiations with the HSE, firstly to obtain Exemptions for Scientific Diving (HSE), and later to create new regulations for specialised diving groups through supervisory Approved Codes of Practice such as the Scientific and archaeological diving projects: Diving at work regulations 1997. The negotiations on safety also led to the formation of the Scientific Diving Supervisory Committee as an advisory body for UK governmental research groups. Reciprocal standards of training and safety for scientific diving were also agreed throughout European agencies and national bodies.

== Merger with the Society for Underwater Technology ==
The Underwater Association performed a vital role in the early stages of scientific diving, but ceased to function in 1992. The situation had changed since the 1960s, when it was very difficult for diving scientists to share expertise, and scientific papers in narrow-discipline journals seldom mentioned the use of diving. Before the days of digital search engines, it was hard to assess the scope of underwater observations, or to learn from the experimental techniques of other researchers. The best way to develop underwater research was to organise national and international meetings, and to publish the proceedings. When digital media and citation indices increased, academics preferred to publish in journals specific to their own disciplines rather than in general diving publications, and they did not need to attend meetings devoted to diving science. Diving for research purposes had become a common practice. As membership declined, a merger with the Society for Underwater Technology (SUT) was organised by John Bevan.
