= Stenohaline =

Term describing organisms that cannot tolerate a wide range of salinities

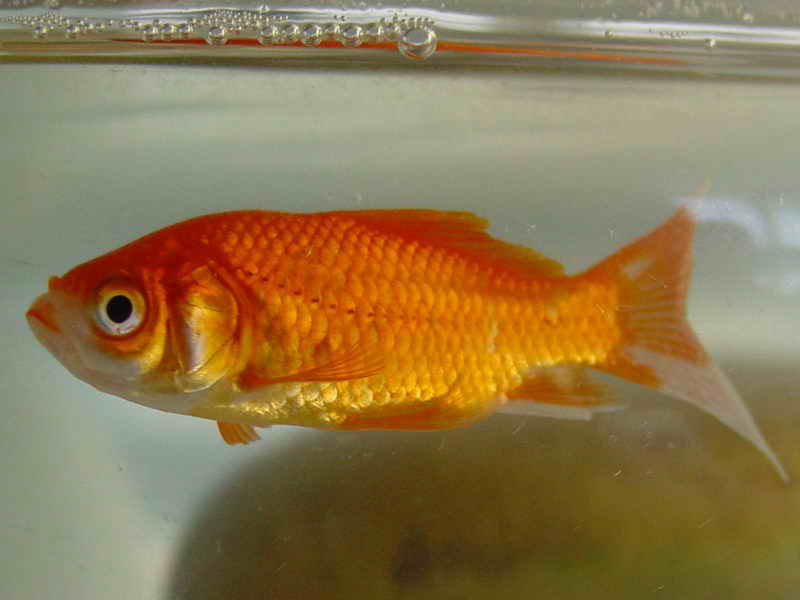
Goldfish (Carassius auratus) are an example of a well known freshwater stenohaline fish.

Stenohaline describes an organism, usually fish, that cannot tolerate a wide fluctuation in the salinity of water. Stenohaline is derived from the words: "steno" meaning narrow, and "haline" meaning salt. Many fresh water fish, such as goldfish (Carassius auratus), tend to be stenohaline and die in environments of high salinity such as the ocean. Many marine fish, such as haddock, are also stenohaline and die in water with lower salinity.

Alternatively, fish living in coastal estuaries and tide pools are often euryhaline (tolerant to changes in salinity), as are many species which have life cycle requiring tolerance to both fresh water and seawater environments such as salmon and herring.

== See also ==
- Fish migration
- Osmoconformer
- Osmoregulation
- Euryhaline
