= Underwater Technology =

- Language: English
- Edited by: M. D. J. Sayer

Publication details
- History: 1975-present
- Publisher: Society for Underwater Technology
- Frequency: Triannually

Standard abbreviations
- ISO 4: Underw. Technol.

Indexing
- ISSN: 1756-0543 (print); 1756-0551 (web)

Links
- Journal homepage; Online access; Online archive

Underwater Technology is a peer-reviewed scientific journal covering research on underwater technology, ocean science, and offshore engineering. It is the official journal of the Society for Underwater Technology. It was established in 1975 and is published three times per year in a hard copy and an electronic format.

The journal publishes both technical papers and briefings, the latter being shorter papers. In addition, each issue contains a personal view on a timely, and sometimes controversial, subject of interest. Issues often include one to two book reviews on recently published books that relate to the scope of the journal. In addition to its normal open issues, the journal periodically publishes special issues. Past special issues have covered the International Symposium of Occupational Scientific Diving and Oceanology International.
