= Society for Underwater Technology =

International learned society

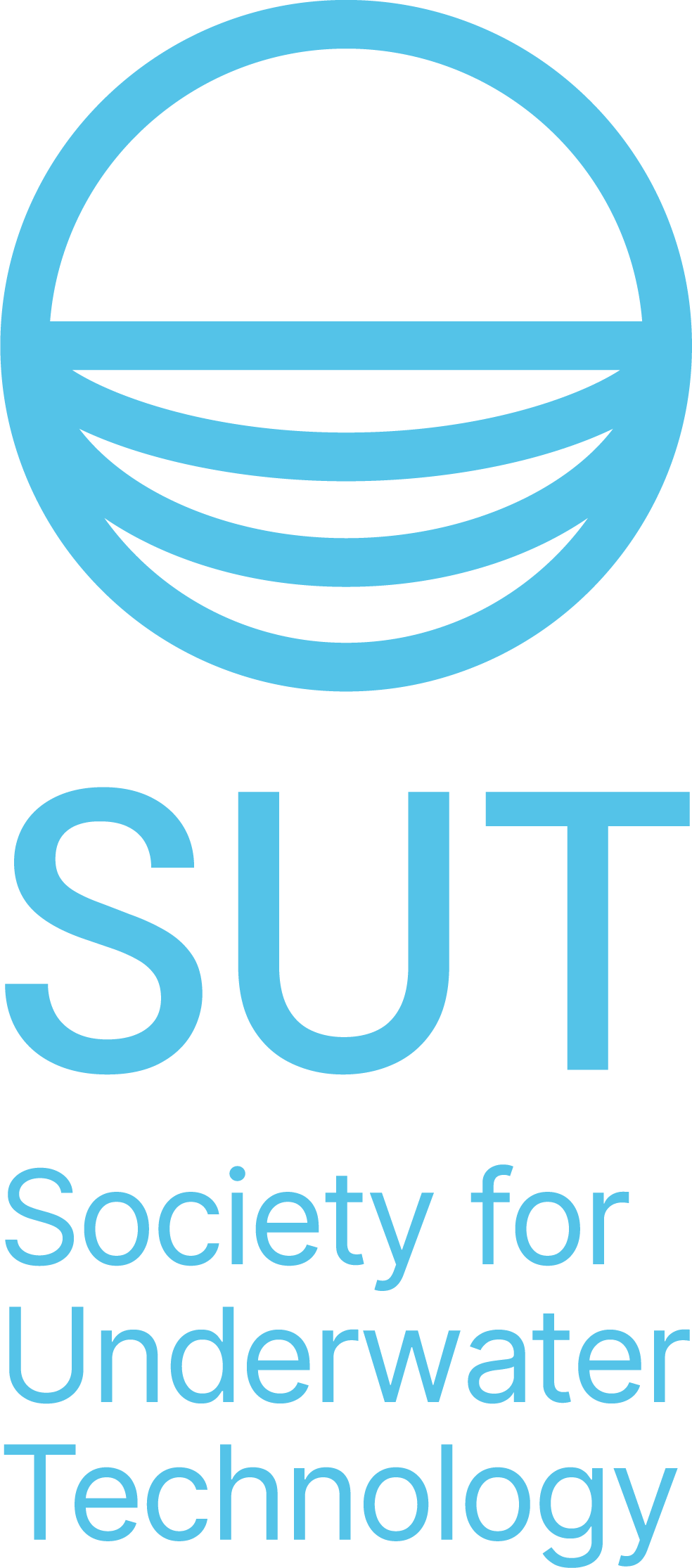
- Predecessor: Underwater Equipment Research Society
- Formation: 1966
- Type: Nonprofit
- Registration no.: Reg Charity No. 256659
- Headquarters: London
- Chief Executive: Cheryl Burgess
- Website: https://sut.org/

The Society for Underwater Technology (SUT) is an international learned society for marine science and technology with headquarters in London, England that was founded in 1966. There are branches in Aberdeen (Scotland), Houston (USA), Rio de Janeiro (Brazil), Newcastle (England), Perth (Australia), London (England), Melbourne (Australia), Kuala Lumpur (Malaysia), Singapore, Norway (Bergen), China (Beijing) West Africa (Nigeria), the Middle East (UAE) and new branches in early stages of development in St John's Newfoundland & the Eastern Mediterranean to be based in Cyprus. Membership is open to individuals, companies, and institutions with a genuine interest in the broad field of underwater technology. SUT is registered as a charity in the UK, other branches are constituted as charities or 'not-for-profits' as per local legislation.

== Goals ==
SUT promotes the further understanding of the underwater environment and encourages, for example:

- Cross-fertilisation and dissemination of ideas, experience and information between workers in academic research, applied research, technology, industry and government.
- Development of techniques and tools to explore, study and sustainably utilise global ocean resources.
- Further education of scientists and technologists to maintain high standards in marine science and technology, and inform policy makers and marine planners about the possibilities that are becoming available.

SUT covers all aspects of technology applied to diving technology and physiology, submersible design and operation, naval architecture, underwater acoustics, subsea systems, geology, geophysics, marine resource exploitation, oceanography, environmental studies, pollution and marine biology. See list below for current special interest groups. Evening lectures & online webinars are organised by most of the branches. Training courses are offered to industry, in particular "Subsea Awareness" courses. Since 2021, SUT along with the Marine Technology Society have begun to offer Chartered Marine Technologist (CMarTech) professional status under license from the Institute of Marine Engineering, Science and Technology.

Education about the marine world, in particular marine industry, is a strong focus for the society and it supports a number of studentships through awards and an "Educational Support Fund". In 2013 SUT Council voted to incorporate the Engineering Committee on Oceanic Resources (ECOR) into SUT.

== Journal ==
SUT publishes a peer-reviewed scientific journal, Underwater Technology, and a monthly magazine UT2.

== History ==
The Society for Underwater Technology was founded in 1966 following the demise of the Underwater Equipment Research Society the previous year. This precursor society had been set up to facilitate the "interchange of information between users and suppliers of [undersea] equipment". Many of its members went on to become early members of the SUT. In 1966 a steering committee was put in place to form the society, leading directly to the first general meeting on 2 March 1967, hosted by Lord Wakefield of Kendall in the House of Lords. Lord Wakefield was elected as president, with Rear Admiral Sir Edmund Irving as the first chairman of council, Nic Flemming as honorary secretary, and V. Grimoldby as honorary treasurer. The original technical committees were "Biological Technology", "Earth Science", and "General Technology".

The first annual meeting was held 7 December 1967 at the Institute of Mechanical Engineers, where the Society had also found a home through the institute's "daughter society" scheme, paying £500 a year for office space and administrative assistance. At this time the Society's association with what was to become Oceanology International was initiated with plans to run a major international conference in 1969 alongside an existing exhibition series in Brighton.

In the early 1970s, branches were developed, mainly in the United Kingdom, while tie-ups with overseas organisations such as the Marine Technology Society in the US and the Engineering Committee for Ocean Engineering were also being sought. Branches were established in East Scotland, West Scotland, East Anglia, Southern England, and Southwest England, while overseas branch possibilities were looked at in Europe.

At the beginning of the 1980s, the branch structure was reduced to a group of regional organisers who organised activities across the United Kingdom in the Southwest, Southern England, the Midlands and Northwest, Scotland East, Scotland Northeast, and Scotland West. In the 1990s the Aberdeen Branch, Southern, and Northeastern Branches were formed.

In 1983 the Educational Support Fund was launched.

In 1990 SUT moved home to the Institute of Marine Engineers and in 2019 moved to an office located at 2 John Street, London WC1N 2ES.

In 1992, the Society merged with the Underwater Association.

Cmdr Ian Gallett RN (retired) succeeded Cmdr David Wardle RN (retired) as Secretary (later Chief Executive Officer) of SUT in 1994, with Dr Bob Allwood taking on the role in 2009.

SUT was modernised throughout the period of Ian Gallett & Bob Allwood's leadership, emerging as a modern, international marine Learned Society with updated statutes and structure by 2015. By this point over 40% of members were located outside the UK, with the strongest branches being Aberdeen, Houston, London and Perth (Australia) and smaller branches operating in Brazil, China, Malaysia, Norway & Singapore plus emerging branches in Canada and Middle East. The Engineering Committee on Oceanic Resources, based in Halifax, Nova Scotia, became a partner of SUT in 2013.

In April 2017 Stephen Hall, former vice-chair of the Intergovernmental Oceanographic Commission of UNESCO became the Chief Executive on Bob Allwood's retirement, and served until December 2020. The current CEO is Cheryl Burgess, who took up duties in early 2021. The Society is governed by an elected Council, who hold annual elections in December. For 2022 the Chair is Susan John, and the Honorary President is Moya Crawford - this marks the first time in SUT's history that CEO, Chair & President of SUT have all been female. The first female president of SUT was Judith Patten MBE, who served in that role for 2021.

During 2020 as a consequence of the global coronavirus outbreak and difficulty in conducting face to face meetings, SUT began offering a weekly Underwater Technology podcast, and fortnightly webinars.

In 2021 the Society moved registered office onboard HQS Wellington on the Thames Embankment, London.

As of February 2022 the main special interest groups of SUT in the UK were as follows, note that other branches will have their own special interest groups, or work through the UK one, depending upon numbers of interested members.

- Diving and manned submersibles
- Defence
- Education
- Environmental Forces
- Marine Environmental Science
- Marine Renewable Energies
- Ocean Resources
- Offshore Site Investigation and Geotechnics& early career OSIG
- Panel on Underwater Robotics (with ECOR, the Engineering Committee on Oceanic Resources)
- Policy Advisory
- Salvage and Decommissioning
- Subsea Engineering
- Underwater Science
- UXO (Unexploded Ordnance)
- Young Professionals
