= Osmoconformer =

Marine organism

Osmoconformers are marine organisms that maintain an internal environment which is isotonic to their external environment. This means that the osmotic pressure of the organism's cells is equal to the osmotic pressure of their surrounding environment. By minimizing the osmotic gradient, this subsequently minimizes the net influx and efflux of water into and out of cells. Even though osmoconformers have an internal environment that is isosmotic to their external environment, the types of ions in the two environments differ greatly in order to allow critical biological functions to occur.

An advantage of osmoconformation is that such organisms don’t need to expend as much energy as osmoregulators in order to regulate ion gradients. However, to ensure that the correct types of ions are in the desired location, a small amount of energy is expended on ion transport. A disadvantage to osmoconformation is that the organisms are subject to changes in the osmolarity of their environment.

== Examples ==
=== Invertebrates ===
Most osmoconformers are marine invertebrates such as echinoderms (such as starfish), mussels, marine crabs, lobsters, jellyfish, ascidians (sea squirts - primitive chordates), and scallops. Some insects are also osmoconformers. Some osmoconformers, such as echinoderms, are stenohaline, which means they can only survive in a limited range of external osmolarities. The survival of such organisms is thus contingent on their external osmotic environment remaining relatively constant. On the other hand, some osmoconformers are classified as euryhaline, which means they can survive in a broad range of external osmolarities. Mussels are a prime example of a euryhaline osmoconformer. Mussels have adapted to survive in a broad range of external salinities due to their ability to close their shells which allows them to seclude themselves from unfavorable external environments.

=== Craniates ===
There are a couple of examples of osmoconformers that are craniates such as hagfish, skates and sharks. Their body fluid is isosmotic with seawater, but their high osmolarity is maintained by making the concentration of organic solutes unnaturally high. Sharks concentrate urea in their bodies, and since urea denatures proteins at high concentrations, they also accumulate trimethylamine N-oxide (TMAO) to counter the effect. Sharks adjust their internal osmolarity according to the osmolarity of the sea water surrounding them. Rather than ingesting sea water in order to change their internal salinity, sharks are able to absorb sea water directly. This is due to the high concentration of urea kept inside their bodies. This high concentration of urea creates a diffusion gradient which permits the shark to absorb water in order to equalize the concentration difference. The crab-eating frog, or Rana cancrivora, is an example of a vertebrate osmoconformer. The crab-eating frog also regulates its rates of urea retention and excretion, which allows them to survive and maintain their status as osmoconformers in a wide range of external salinities. Hagfish maintain an internal ion composition plasma that differs from that of seawater. The internal ionic environment of hagfish contains a lower concentration of divalent ions (Ca2+, Mg2+, SO4 2-) and a slightly higher concentration of monovalent ions. Hagfish therefore have to expend some energy for osmoregulation.

== Biochemistry ==
Ion gradients are crucial to many major biological functions on a cellular level. Consequently, the ionic composition of an organism's internal environment is highly regulated with respect to its external environment. Osmoconformers have adapted so that they utilize the ionic composition of their external environment, which is typically seawater, in order to support important biological functions. For instance, seawater has a high concentration of sodium ions, which helps support muscle contraction and neuronal signaling when paired with high internal concentrations of potassium ions.
