= Euryhaline =

Term describing organisms able to adapt to a wide range of salinities

Euryhaline organisms are able to adapt to a wide range of salinities. An example of a euryhaline fish is the short-finned molly, Poecilia sphenops, which can live in fresh water, brackish water, or salt water.

The green crab (Carcinus maenas) is an example of a euryhaline invertebrate that can live in salt and brackish water. Euryhaline organisms are commonly found in habitats such as estuaries and tide pools where the salinity changes regularly. However, some organisms are euryhaline because their life cycle involves migration between freshwater and marine environments, as is the case with salmon and eels.

The opposite of euryhaline organisms are stenohaline ones, which can only survive within a narrow range of salinities. Most freshwater organisms are stenohaline, and will die in seawater, and similarly most marine organisms are stenohaline, and cannot live in fresh water.

== Osmoregulation ==
Osmoregulation

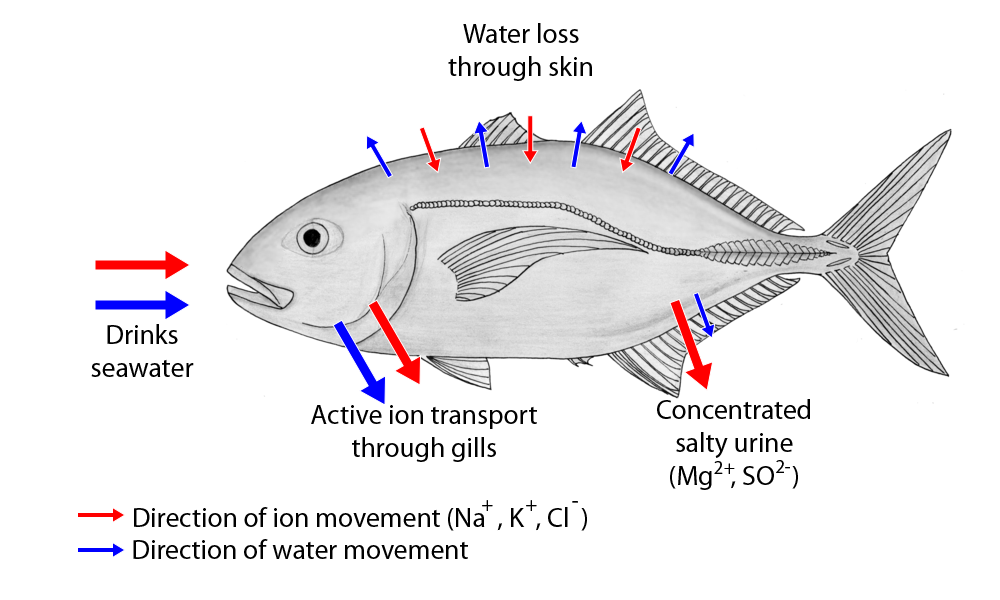
Movement of water and ions in a saltwater fish
(yellow jack)

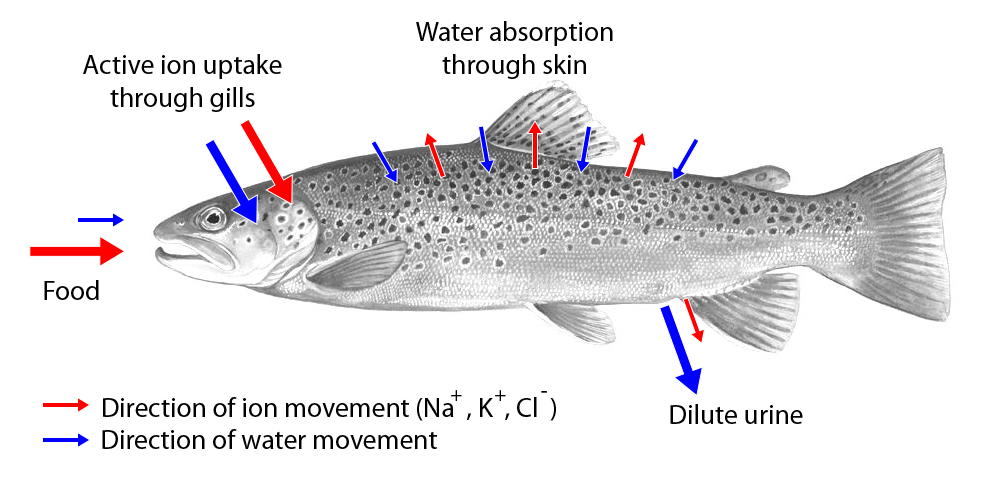
Movement of water and ions in a freshwater fish
(brown trout)

Osmoregulation is the active process by which an organism maintains its level of water content. The osmotic pressure in the body is homeostatically regulated in such a manner that it keeps the organism's fluids from becoming too diluted or too concentrated. Osmotic pressure is a measure of the tendency of water to move into one solution from another by osmosis.

Two major types of osmoregulation are osmoconformers and osmoregulators. Osmoconformers match their body osmolarity to their environment actively or passively. Most marine invertebrates are osmoconformers, although their ionic composition may be different from that of seawater.

Osmoregulators tightly regulate their body osmolarity, which always stays constant, and are more common in the animal kingdom. Osmoregulators actively control salt concentrations despite the salt concentrations in the environment. An example is freshwater fish. The gills actively uptake salt from the environment by the use of mitochondria-rich cells. Water will diffuse into the fish, so it excretes a very hypotonic (dilute) urine to expel all the excess water. A marine fish has an internal osmotic concentration lower than that of the surrounding seawater, so it tends to lose water (to the more negative surroundings) and gain salt. It actively excretes salt out from the gills. Most fish are stenohaline, which means they are restricted to either salt or fresh water and cannot survive in water with a different salt concentration than they are adapted to. However, some fish show a tremendous ability to effectively osmoregulate across a broad range of salinities; fish with this ability are known as euryhaline species, e.g., salmon. Salmon has been observed to inhabit two utterly disparate environments — marine and fresh water — and it is inherent to adapt to both by bringing in behavioral and physiological modifications.

Some marine fish, like sharks, have adopted a different, efficient mechanism to conserve water, i.e., osmoregulation. They retain urea in their blood in relatively higher concentration. Urea is damaging to living tissue so, to cope with this problem, some fish retain trimethylamine oxide. This provides a better solution to urea's toxicity. Sharks, having slightly higher solute concentration (i.e., above 1000 mOsm which is sea solute concentration), do not drink water like marine fish.

== Euryhaline fish ==
Some euryhaline fish

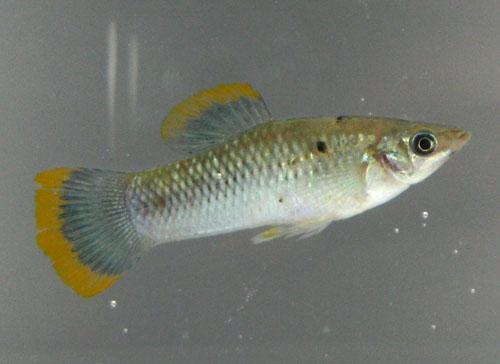
Short-finned molly

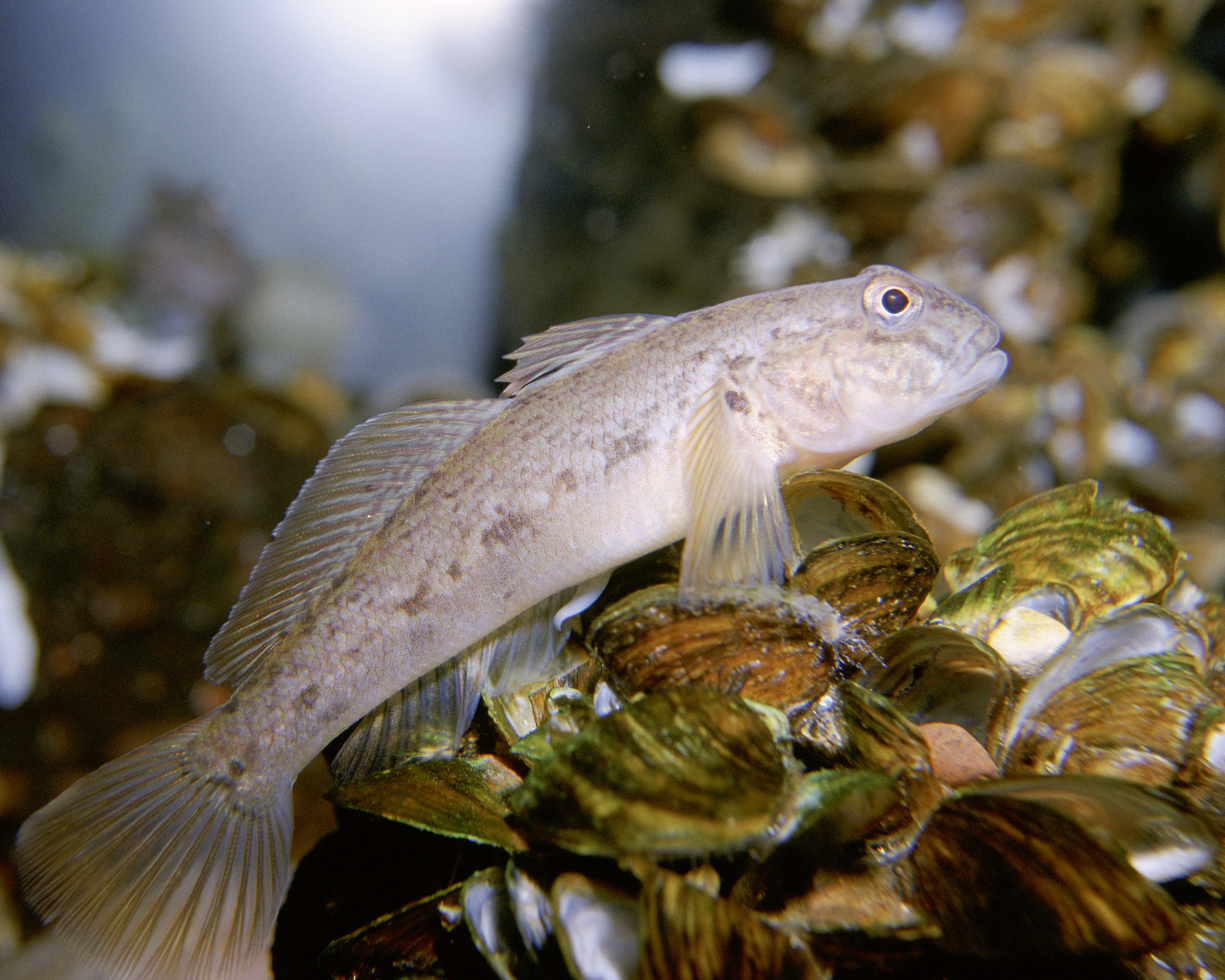
Round goby

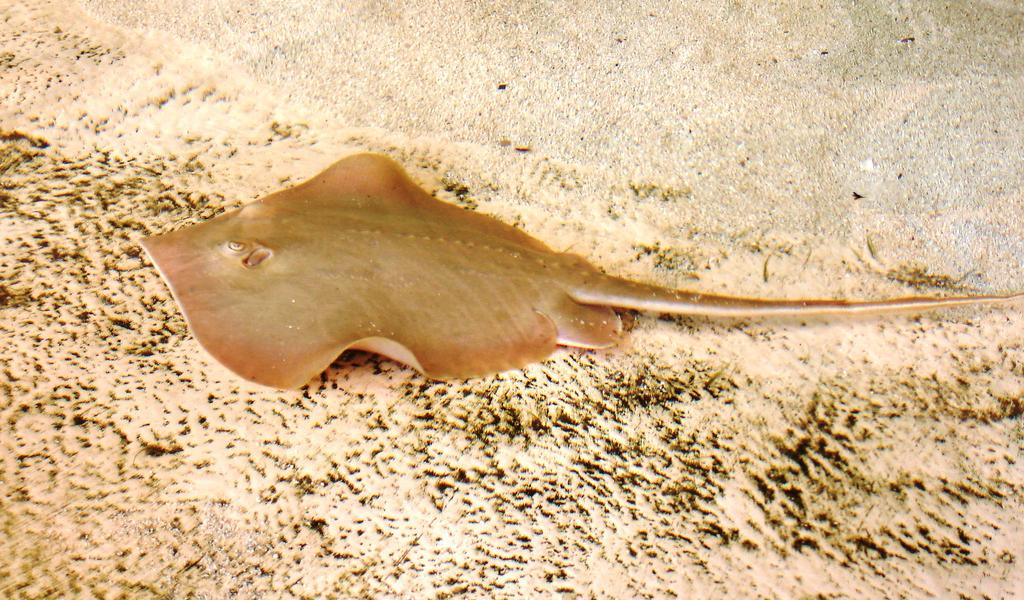
Atlantic stingray

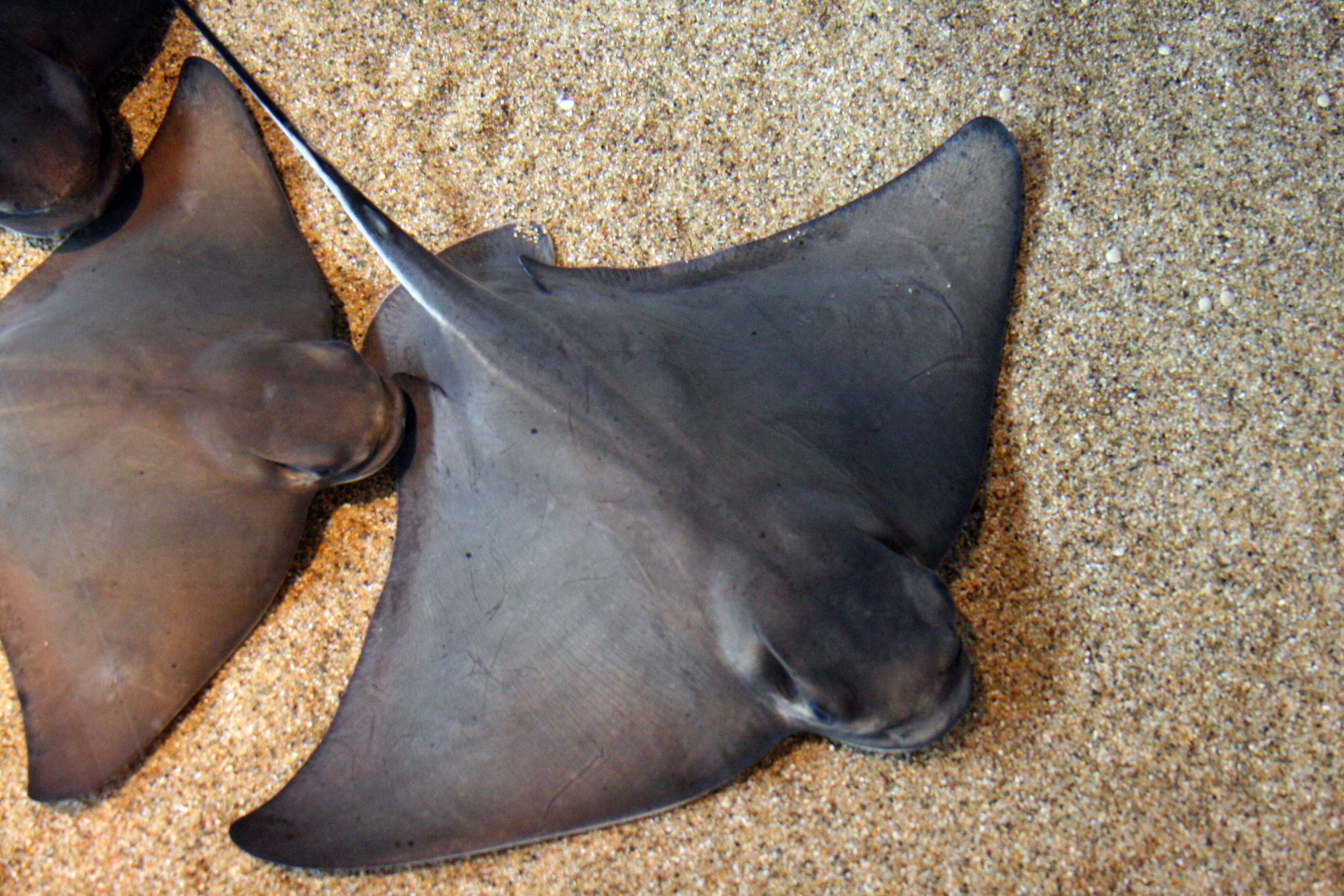
Bat ray

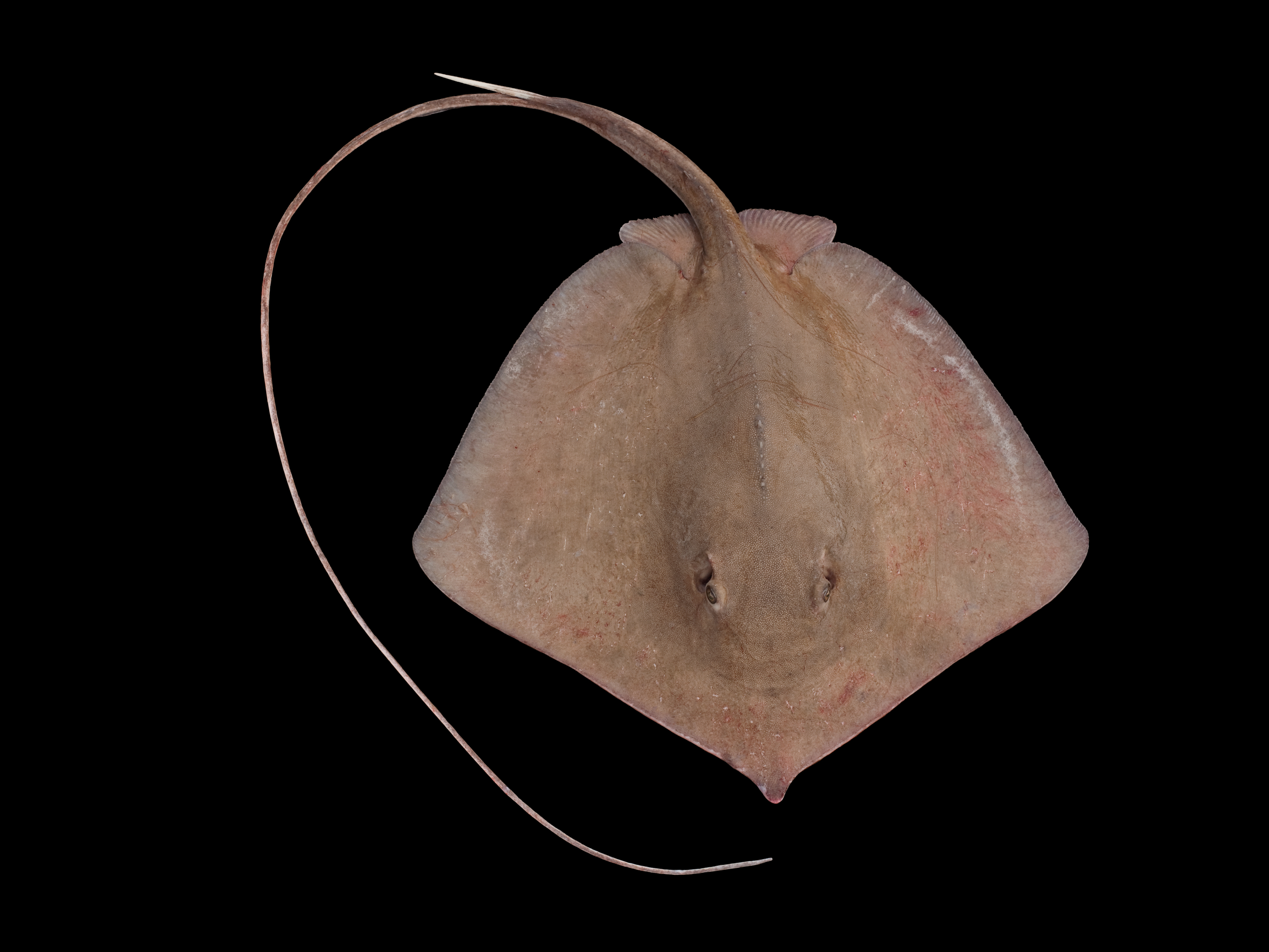
Longnose stingray

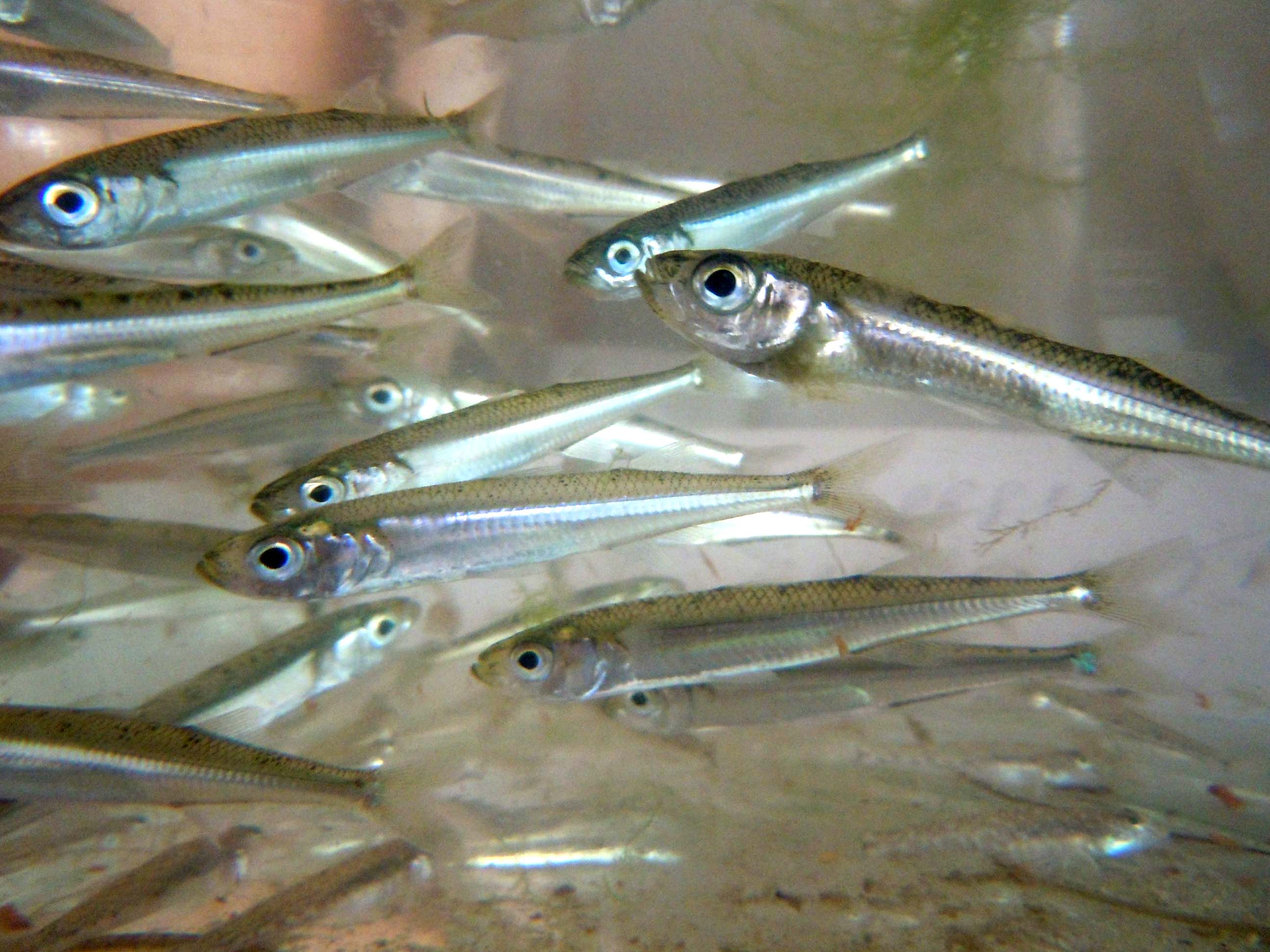
Big-scale sand smelt

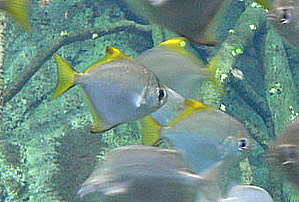
Moonyfishes

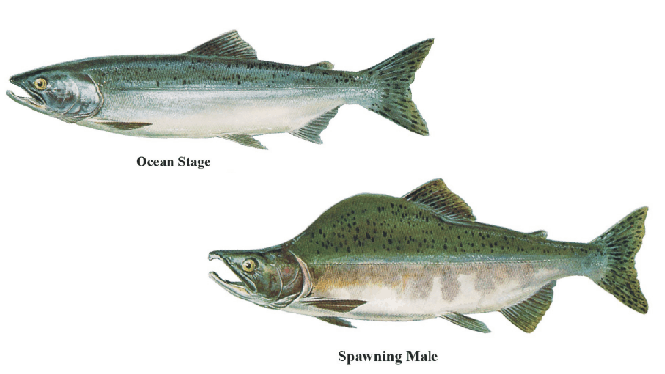
Pink salmon

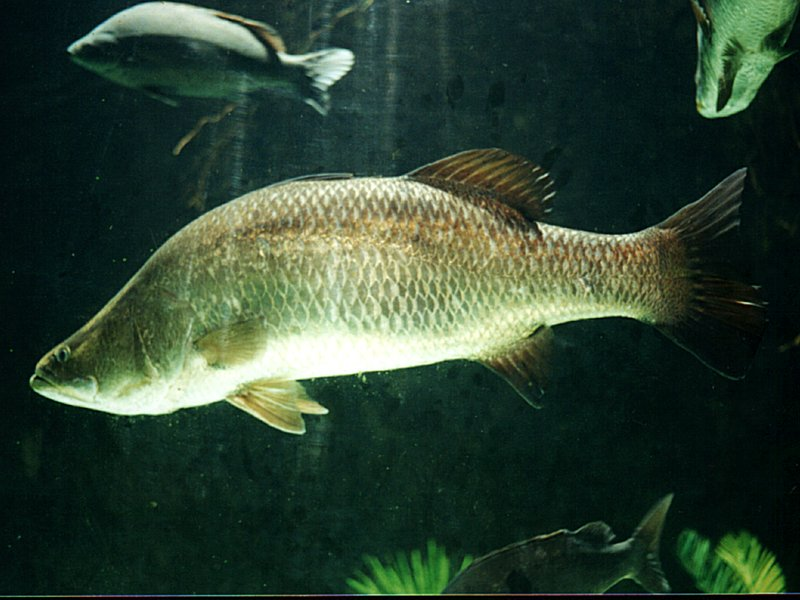
Barramundi

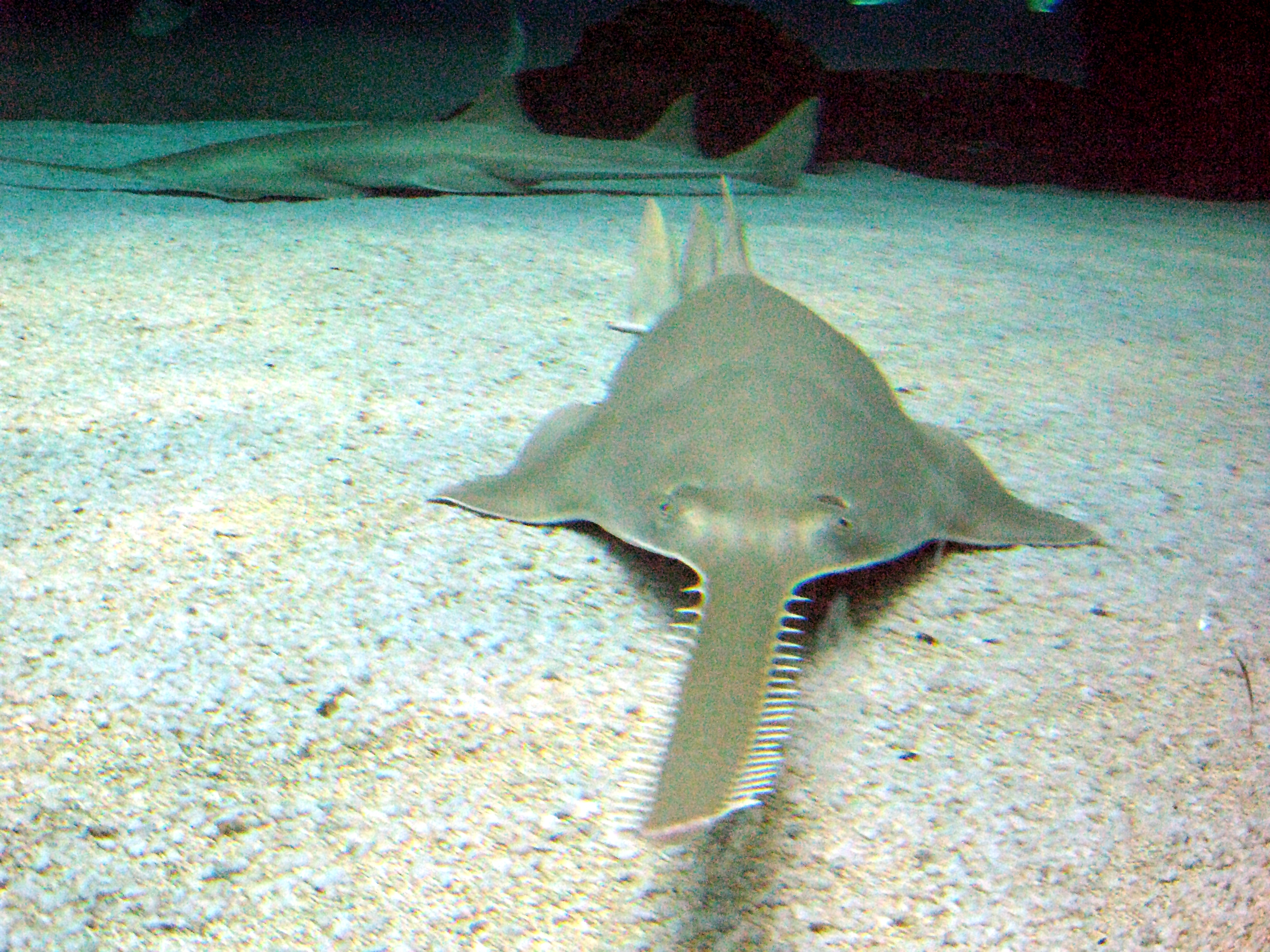
Green sawfish

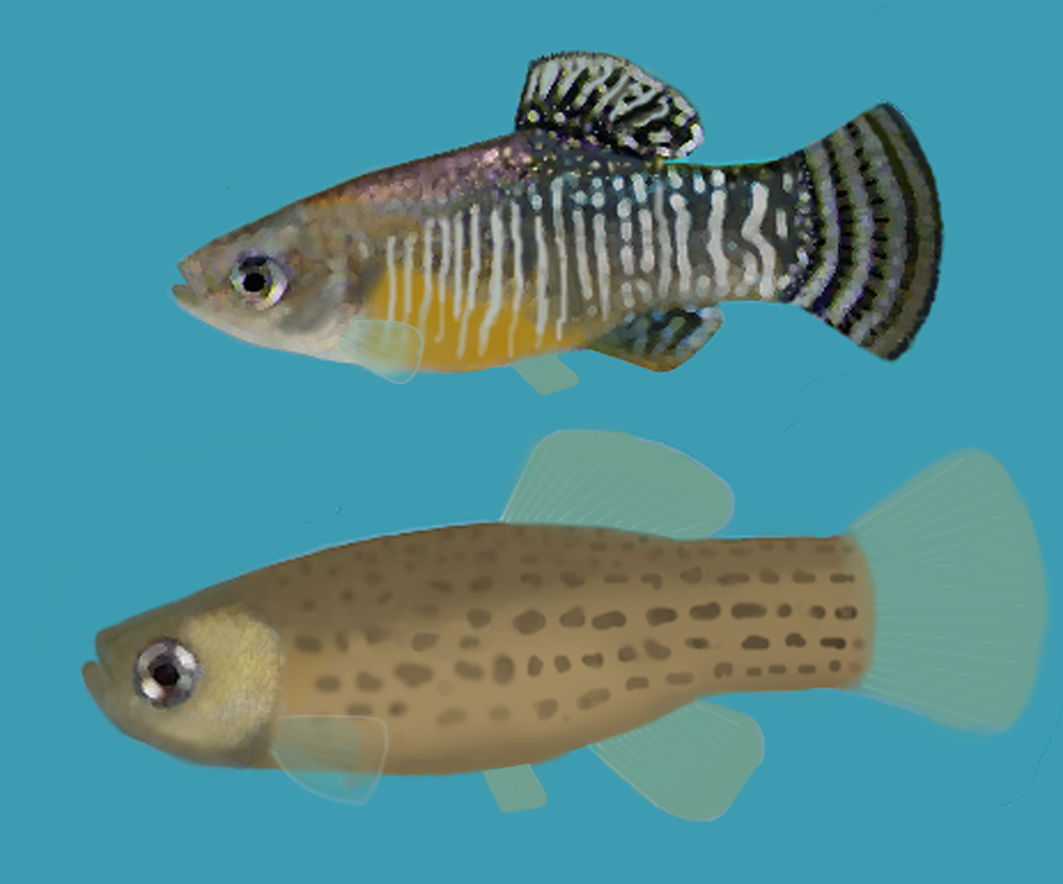
Spanish toothcarp

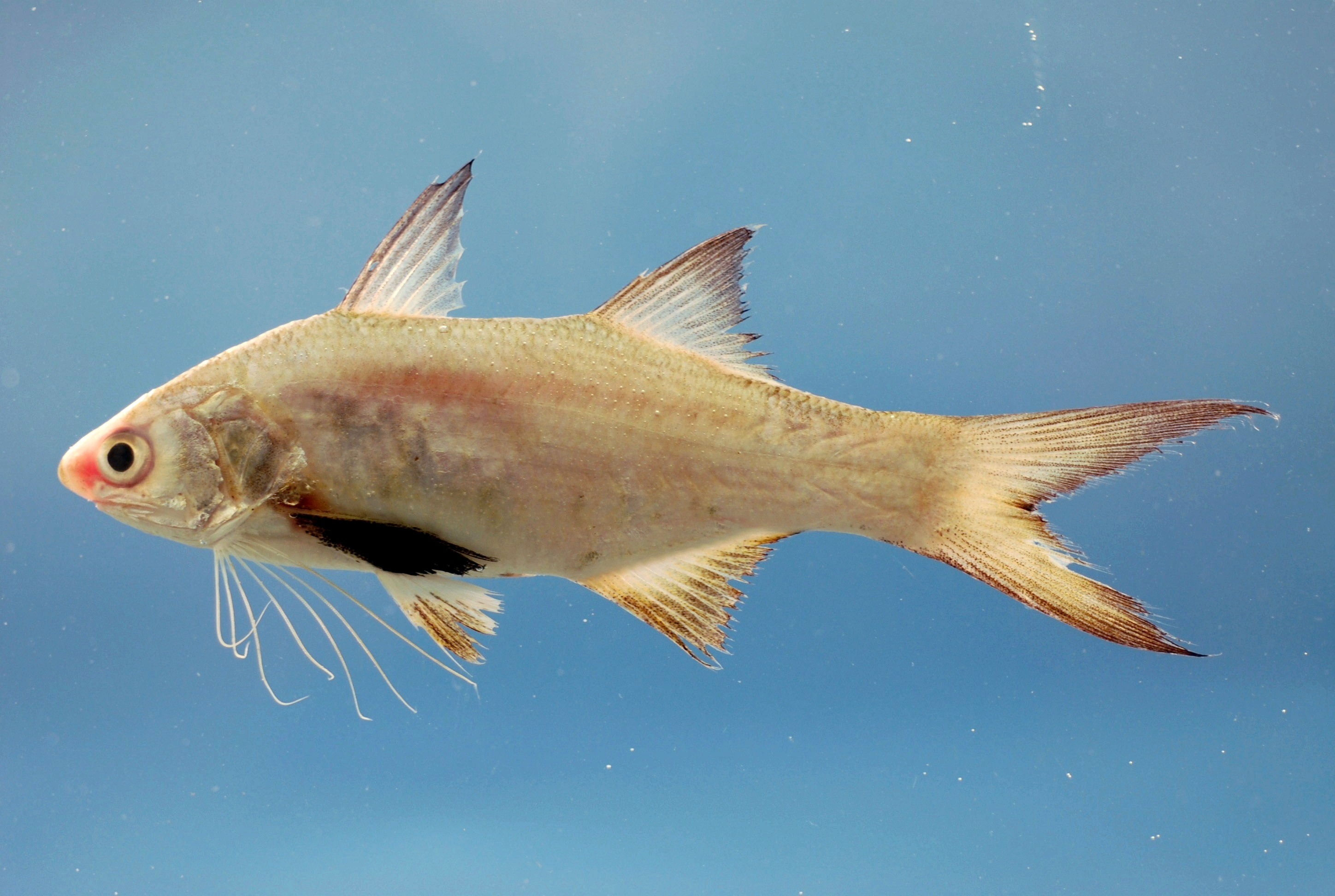
Atlantic threadfin

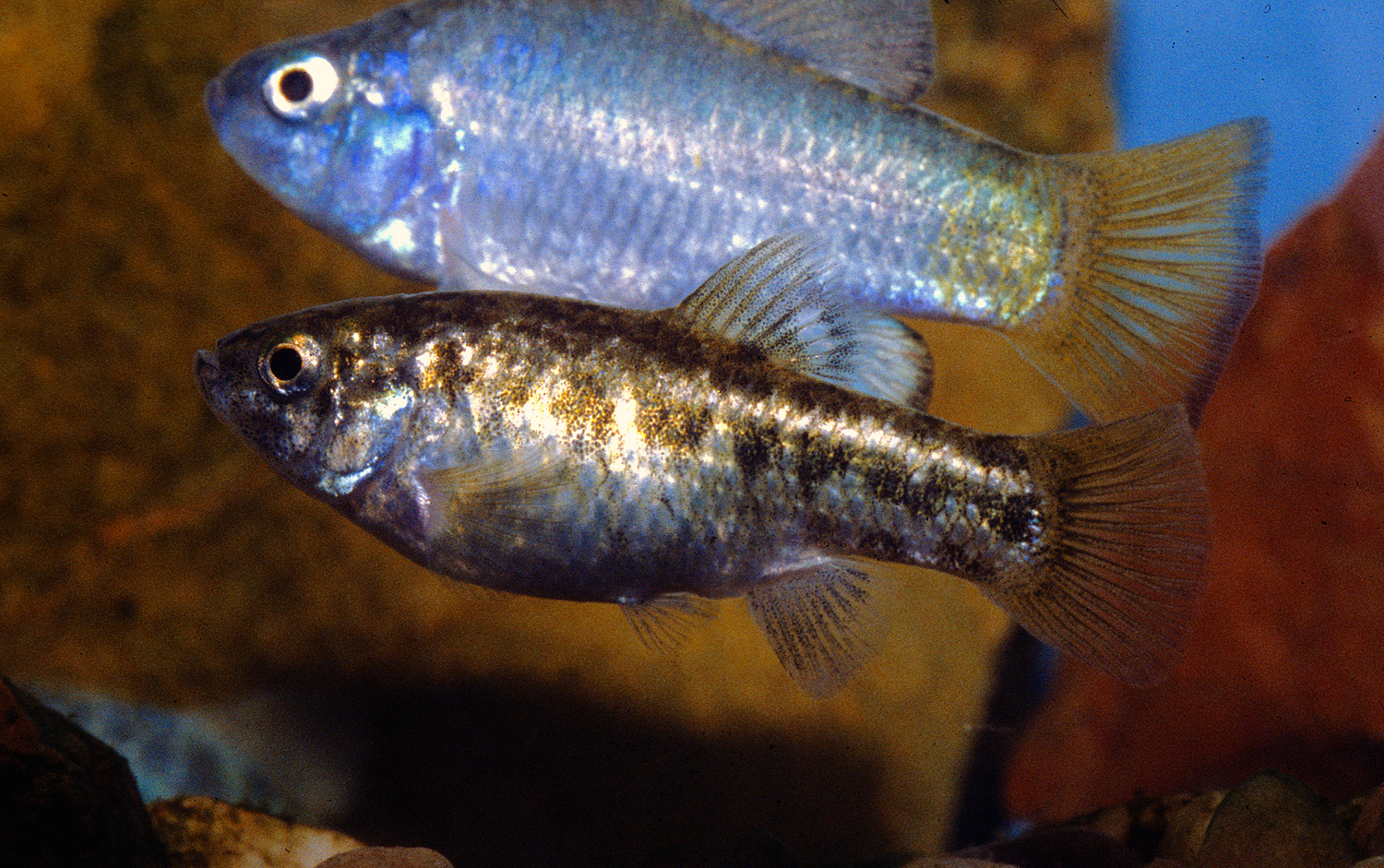
Desert pupfish

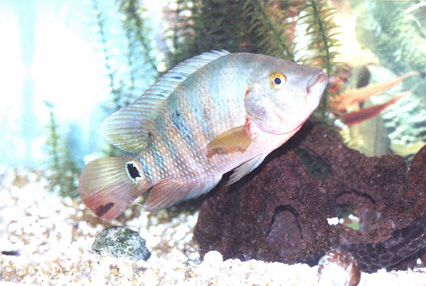
Mayan cichlid

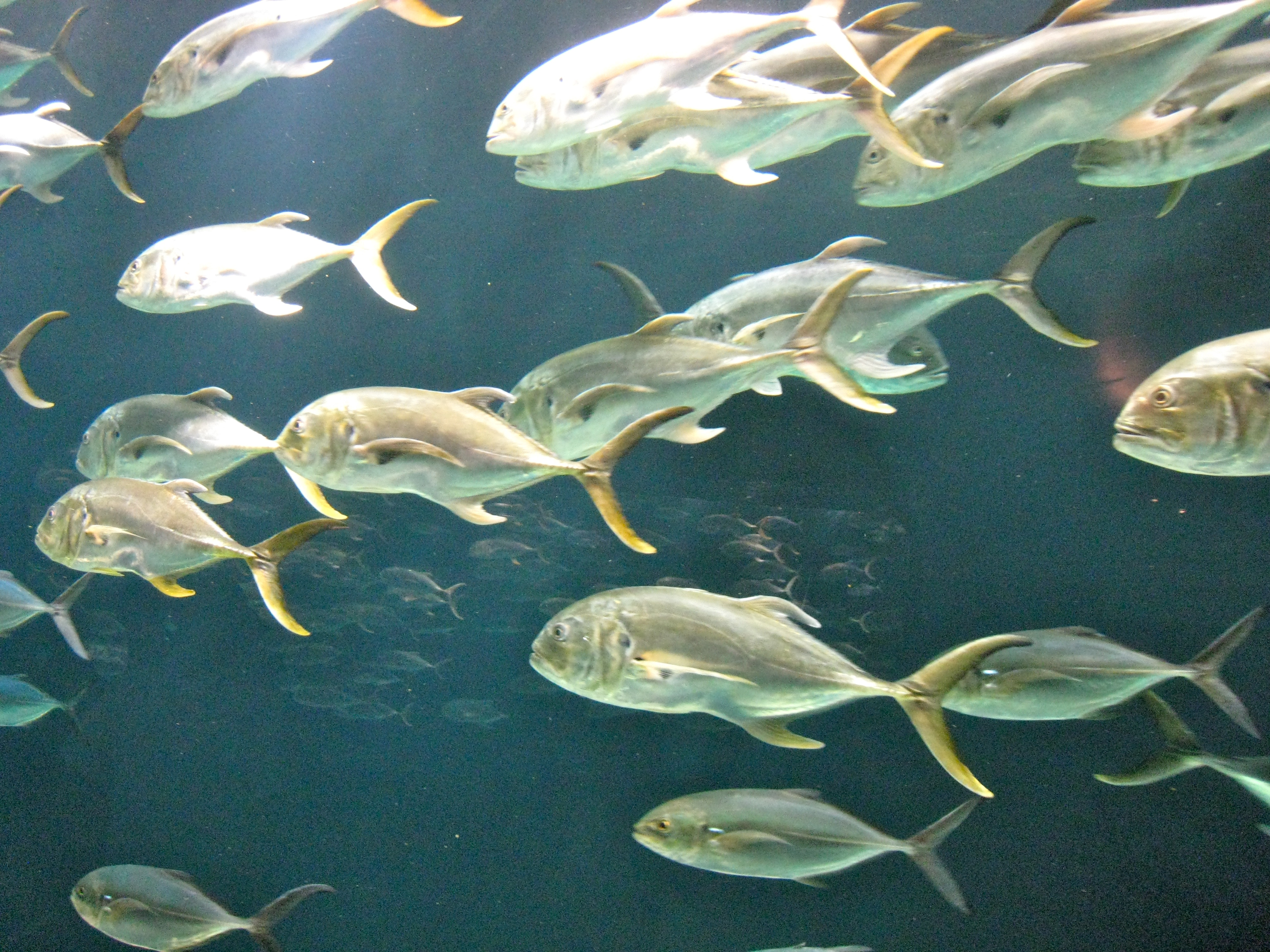
Crevalle jacks

The level of salinity in intertidal zones can also be quite variable. Low salinities can be caused by rainwater or river inputs of freshwater. Estuarine species must be especially euryhaline, or able to tolerate a wide range of salinities. High salinities occur in locations with high evaporation rates, such as in salt marshes and high intertidal pools. Shading by plants, especially in the salt marsh, can slow evaporation and thus ameliorate salinity stress. In addition, salt marsh plants tolerate high salinities by several physiological mechanisms, including excreting salt through salt glands and preventing salt uptake into the roots.

Despite having a regular freshwater presence, the Atlantic stingray is physiologically euryhaline and no population has evolved the specialized osmoregulatory mechanisms found in the river stingrays of the family Potamotrygonidae. This may be due to the relatively recent date of freshwater colonization (under one million years), and/or possibly incomplete genetic isolation of the freshwater populations, as they remain capable of surviving in salt water. Freshwater Atlantic stingrays have only 30-50% the concentration of urea and other osmolytes in their blood compared to marine populations. However, the osmotic pressure between their internal fluids and external environment still causes water to diffuse into their bodies, and they must produce large quantities of dilute urine (at 10 times the rate of marine individuals) to compensate.

Partial list

- Atlantic stingray
- Bull shark
- Green chromide
- Herring
- Lamprey
- Mummichog
- Molly
- Guppy
- Puffer fish
- Salmon
- Shad
- Striped bass
- Sturgeon
- Tilapia
- Trout
- Barramundi
- Mangrove jack
- White perch
- Killifish
- Desert pupfish
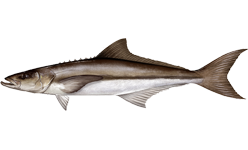
Cobia

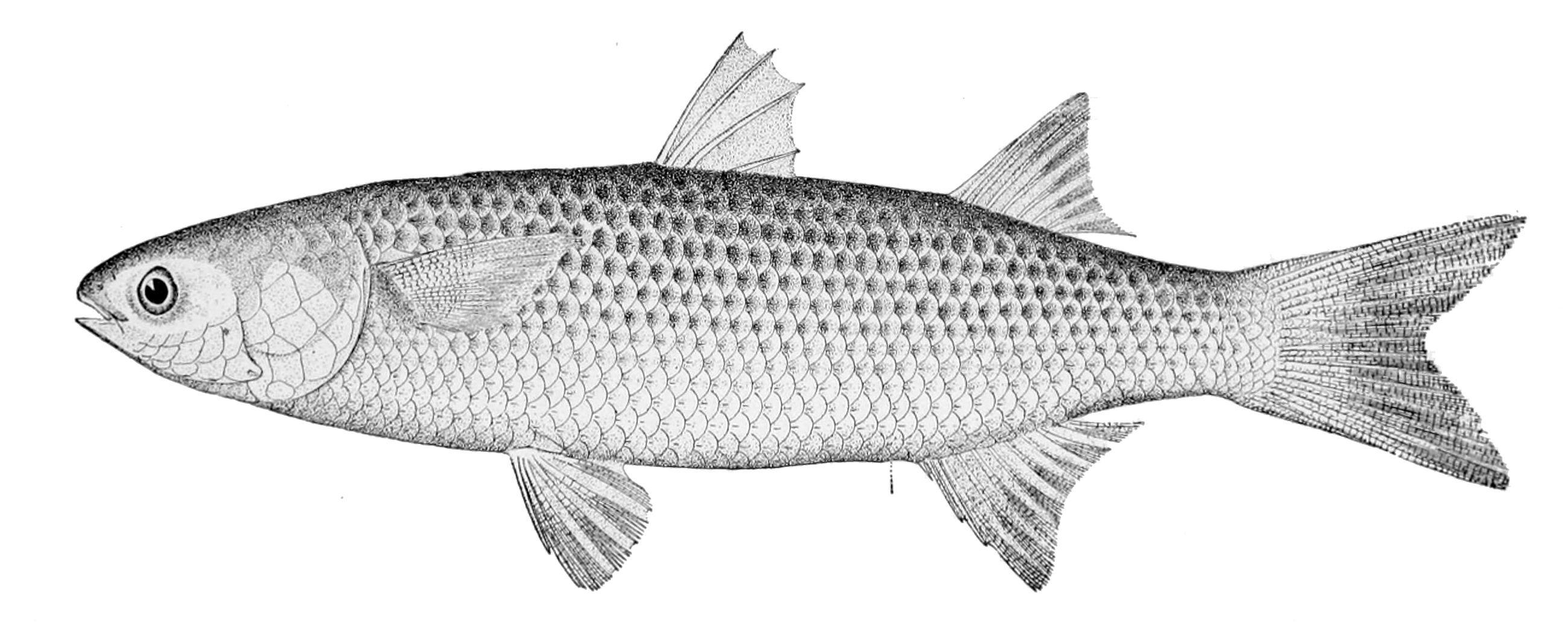
Flathead mullet

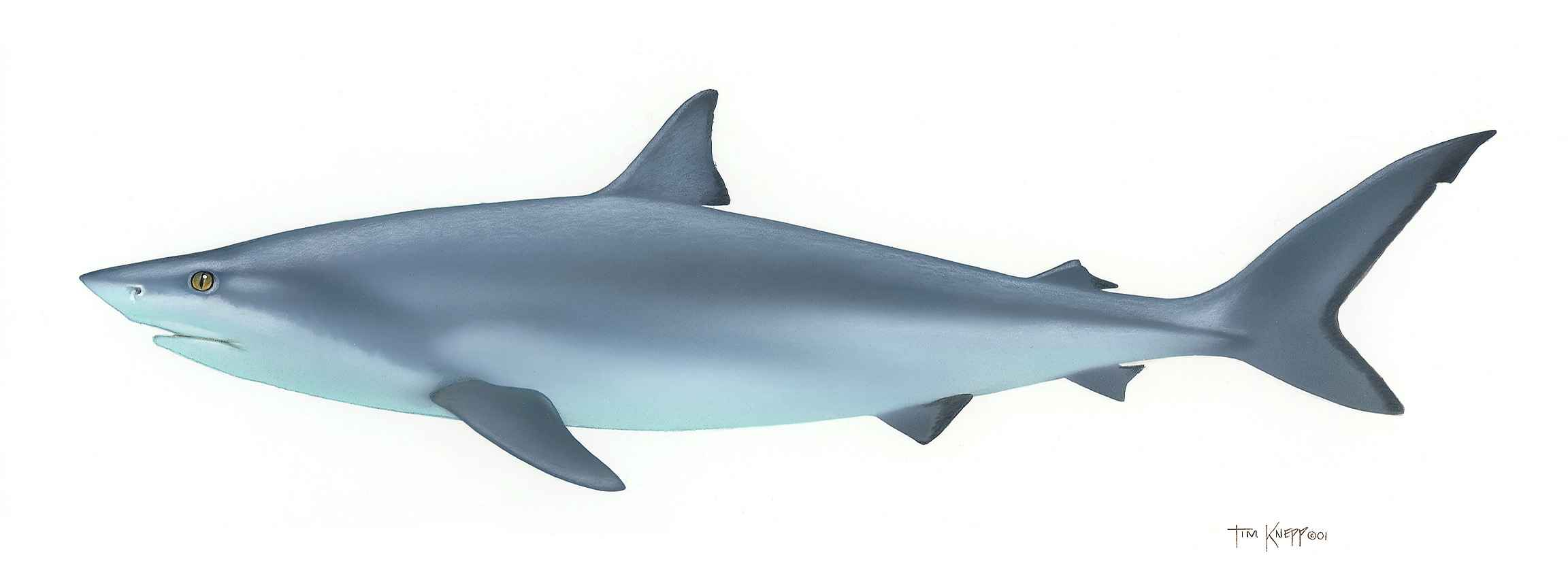
Bull shark

== Other euryhaline organisms ==
other euryhaline organisms

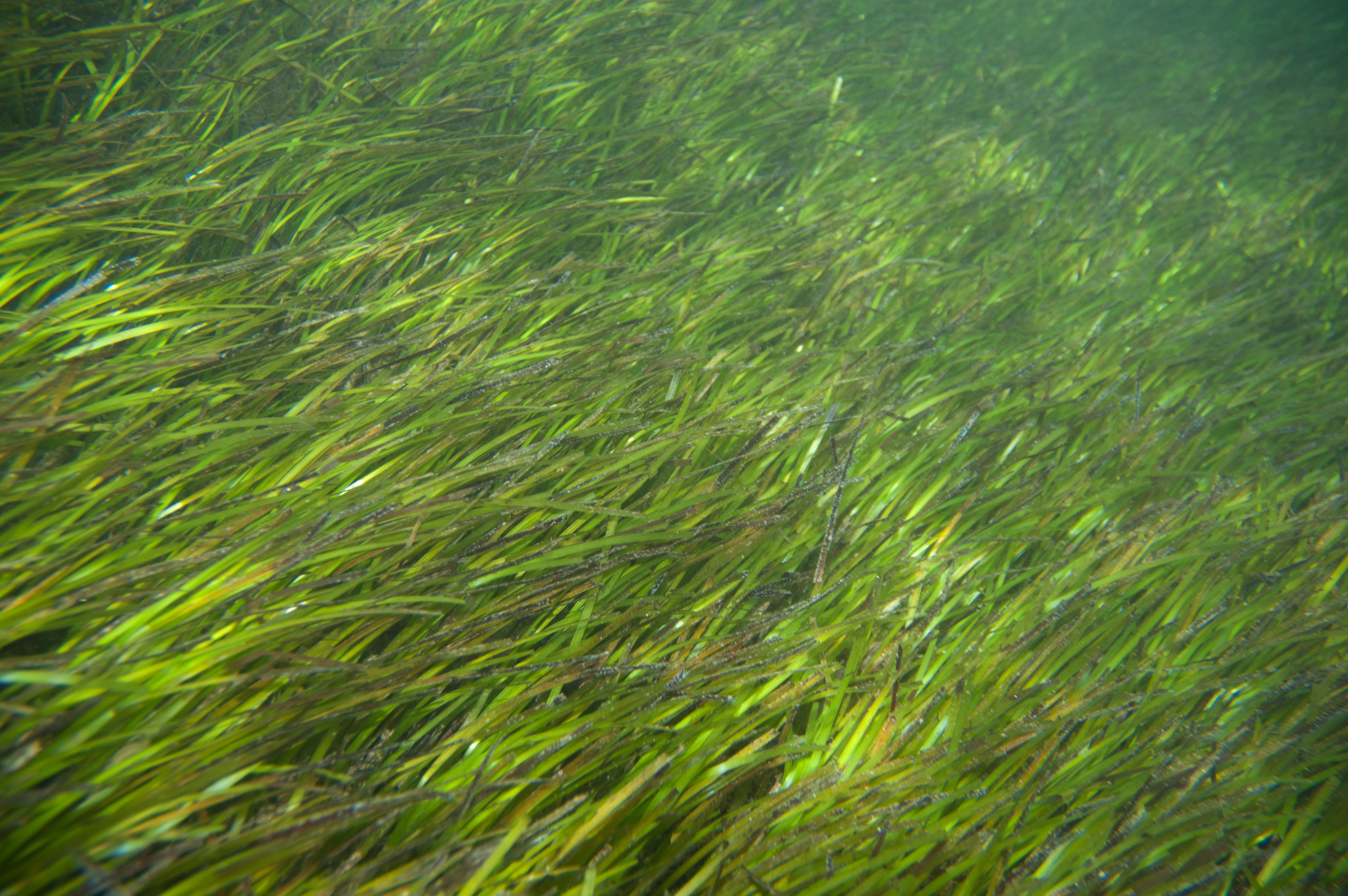
the seagrass Halodule uninervis

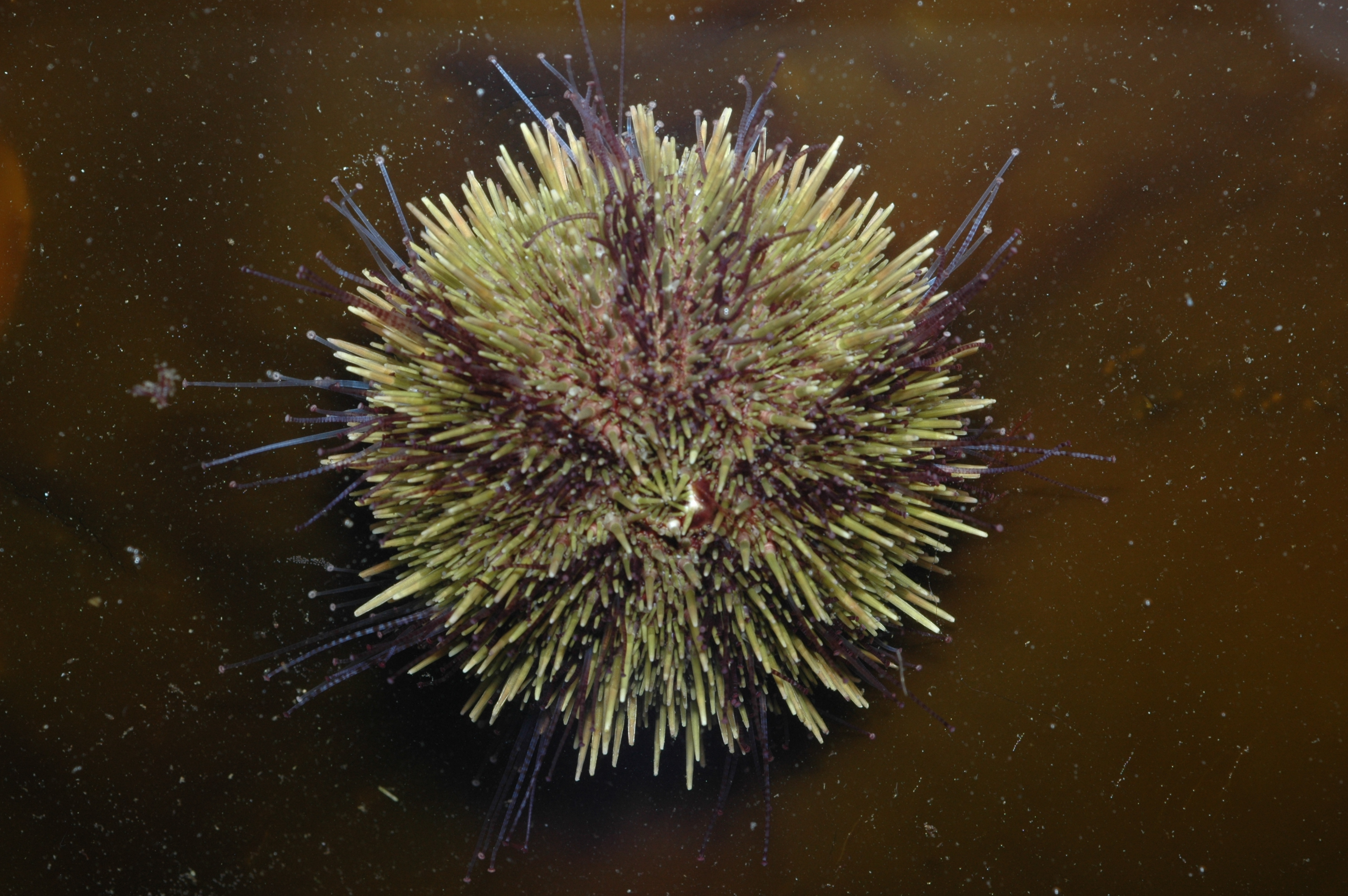
Green sea urchin

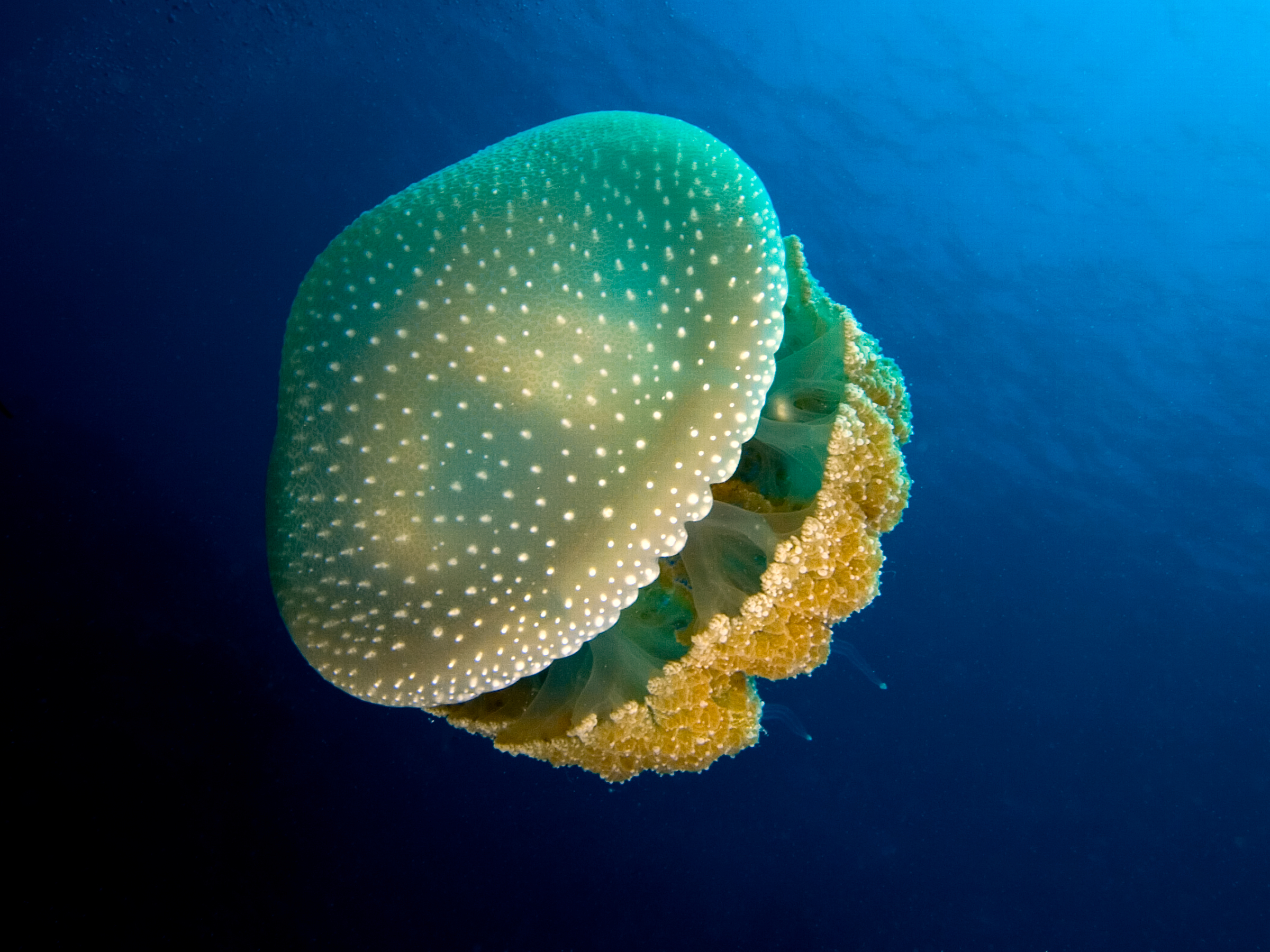
White-spotted jellyfish

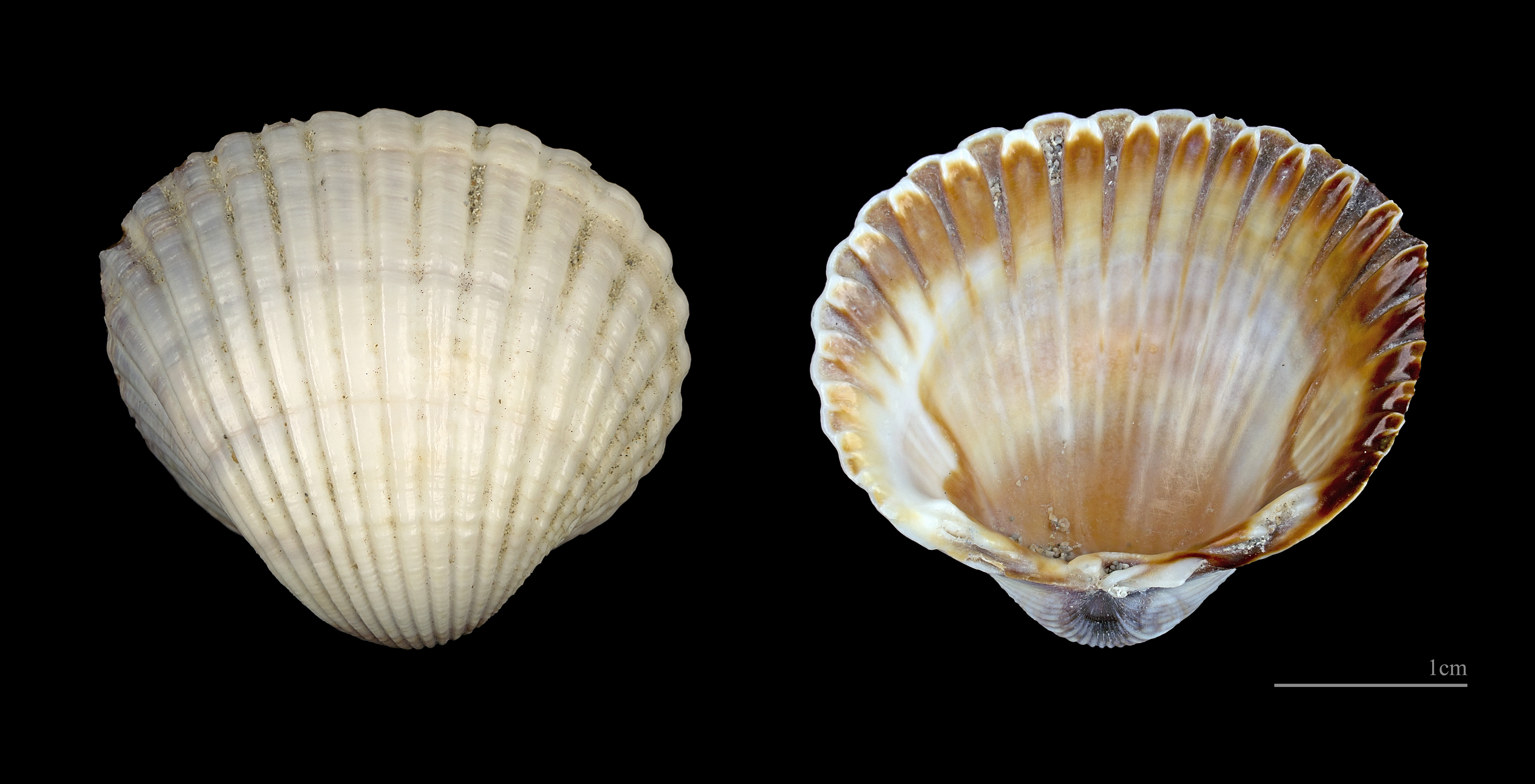
Lagoon cockle

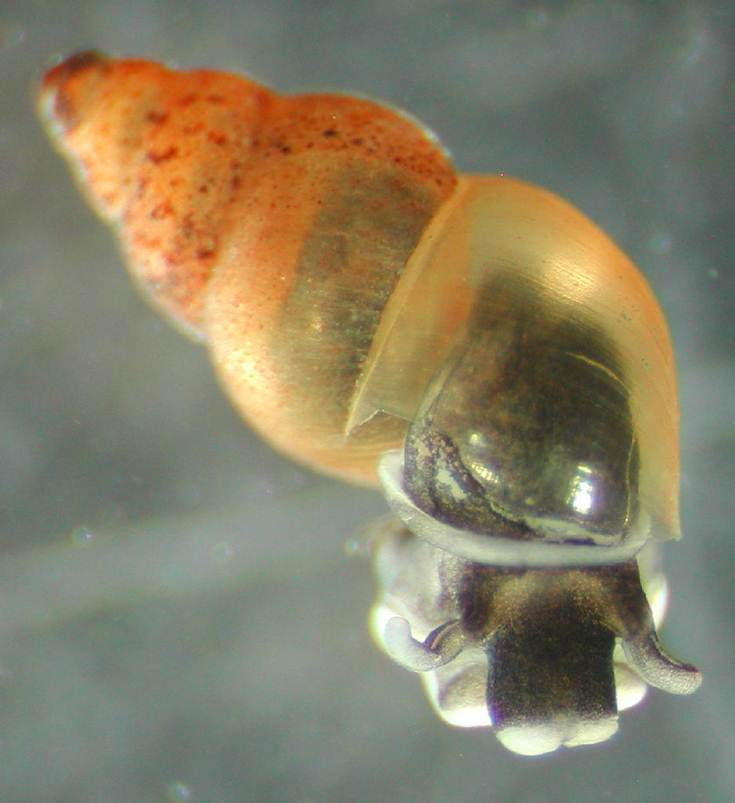
New Zealand mud snail

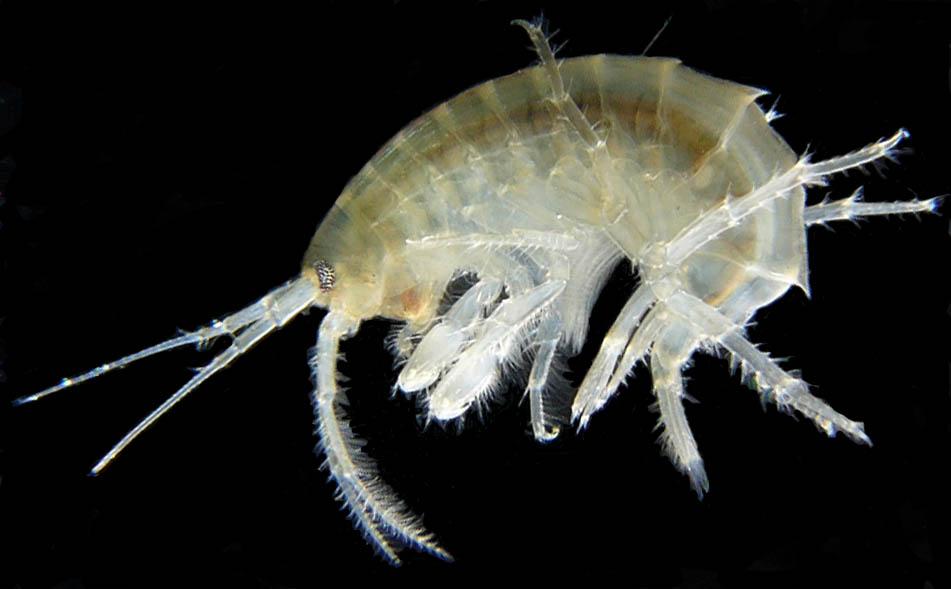
Amphipods of the family Gammaridae

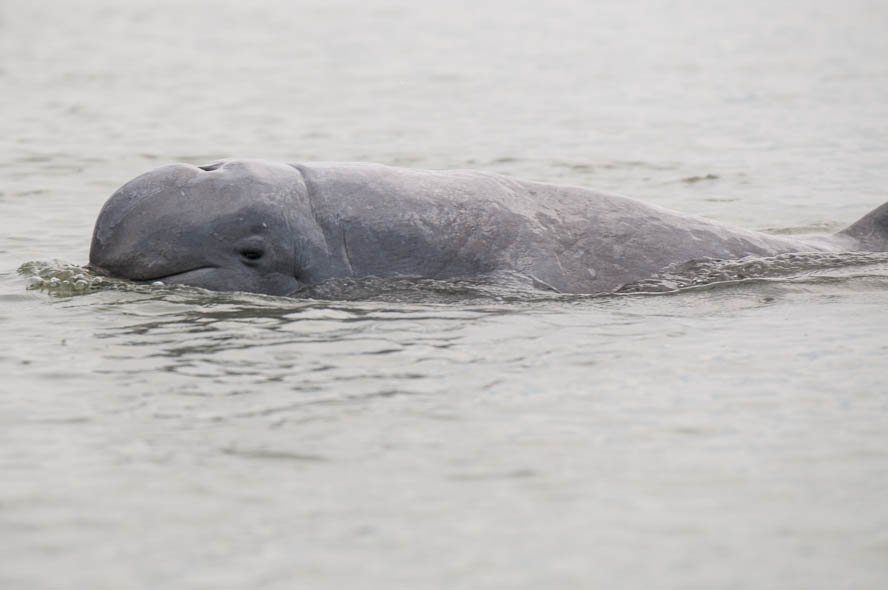
Irrawaddy dolphin

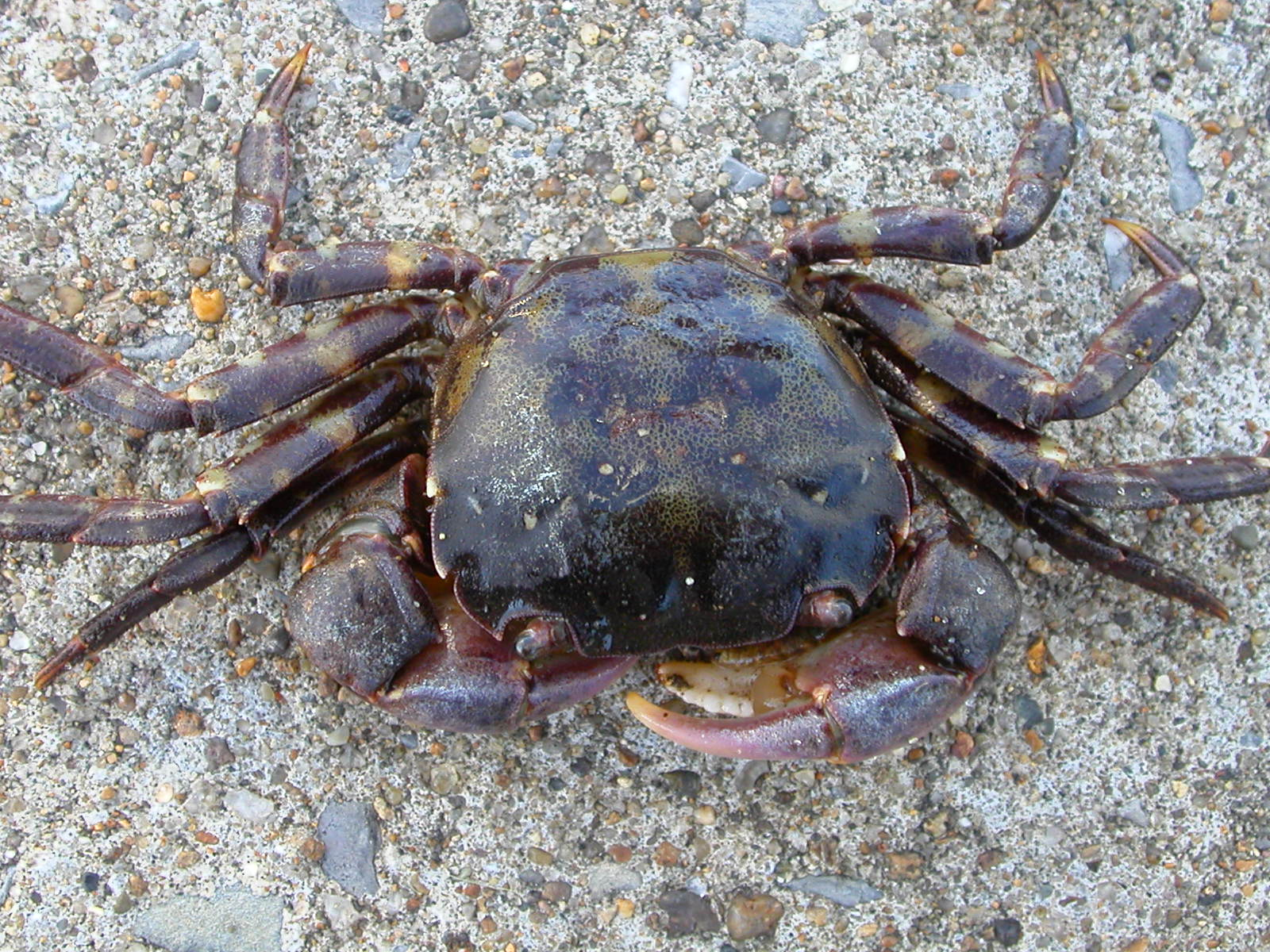
Asian shore crab

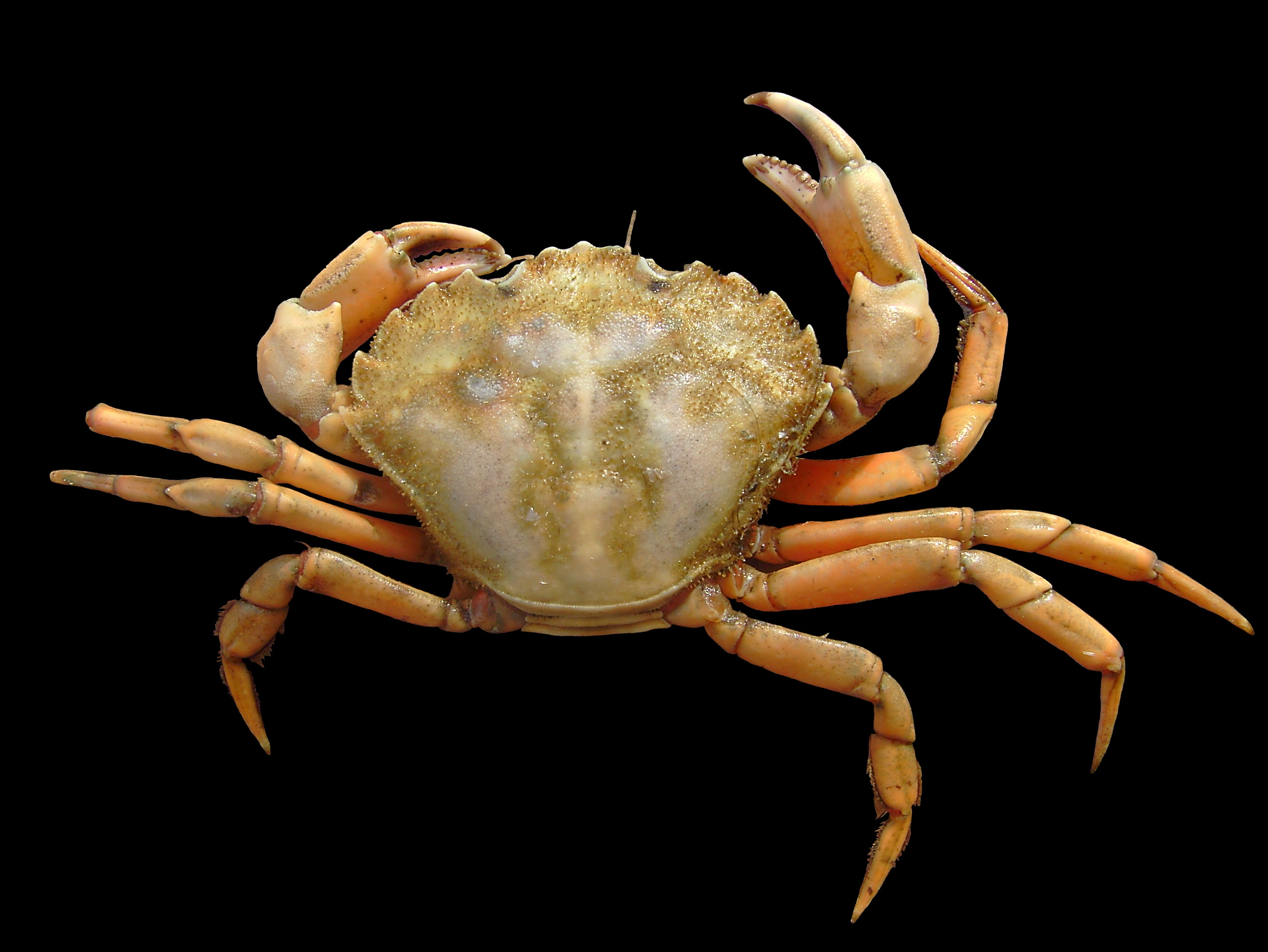
Shore crab

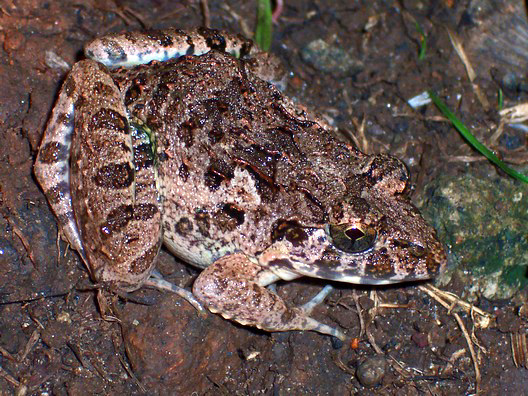
Crab-eating frog

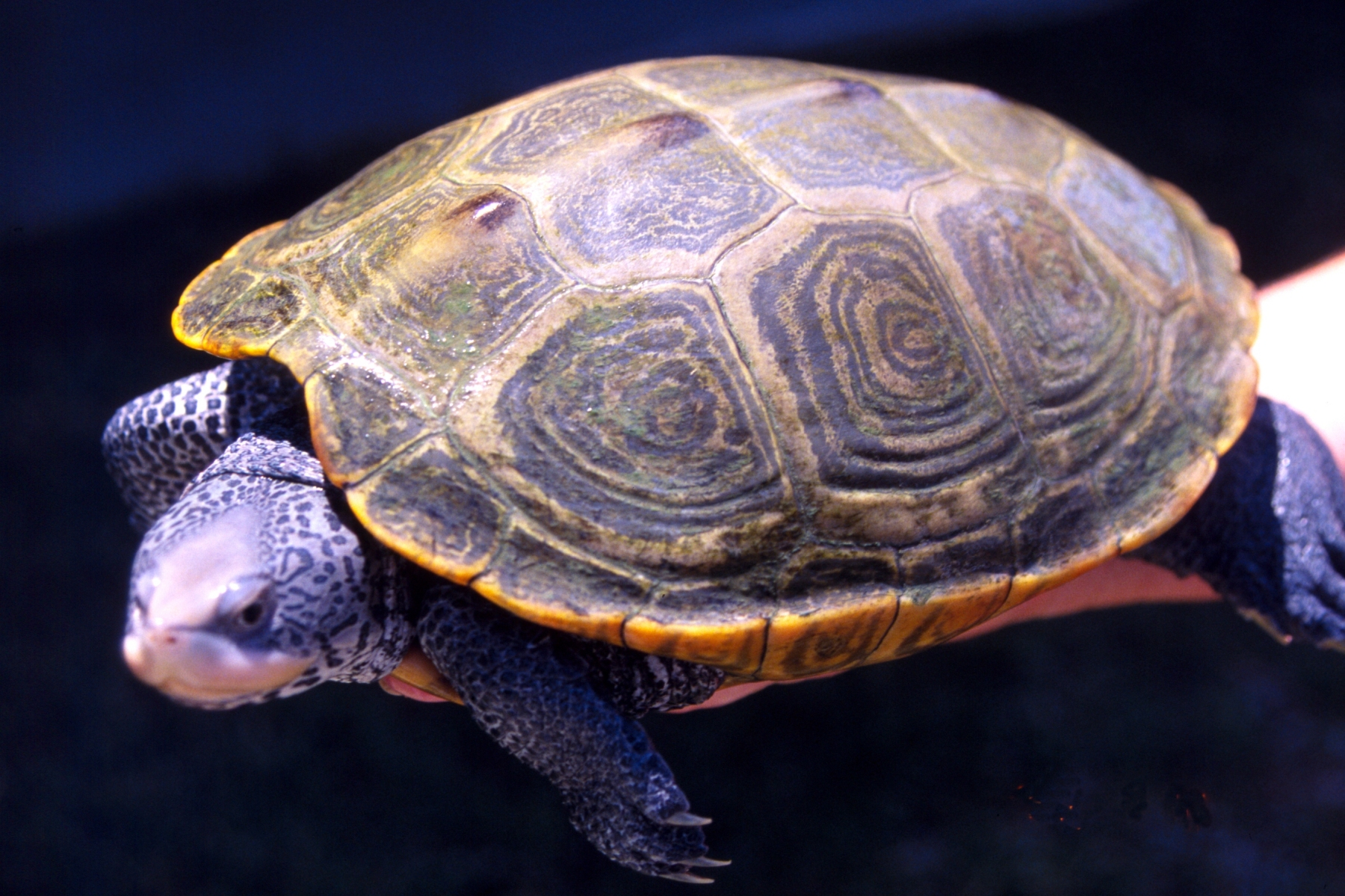
Diamondback terrapin

== See also ==
- Fish migration
- Osmoregulation
- Stenohaline
- Osmoconformer
