= Osmoregulation =

Active control of osmotic pressure to maintain homeostasis

Osmoregulation is the active regulation of the osmotic pressure of an organism's body fluids, detected by osmoreceptors, to maintain the homeostasis of the organism's water content; that is, it maintains the fluid balance and the concentration of electrolytes (salts in solution, which in this case is represented by body fluid) to keep the body fluids from becoming too diluted or concentrated. Osmotic pressure is a measure of the tendency of water to move into one solution from another by osmosis. The higher the osmotic pressure of a solution, the more water tends to move into it. Pressure must be exerted on the hypertonic side of a selectively permeable membrane to prevent diffusion of water by osmosis from the side containing pure water.

Although there may be hourly and daily variations in osmotic balance, an animal is generally in an osmotic steady state over the long term. Organisms in aquatic and terrestrial environments must maintain the right concentration of solutes and amount of water in their body fluids; this involves excretion (getting rid of metabolic nitrogen wastes and other substances such as hormones that would be toxic if allowed to accumulate in the blood) through organs such as the skin and the kidneys.

== Regulators and conformers ==
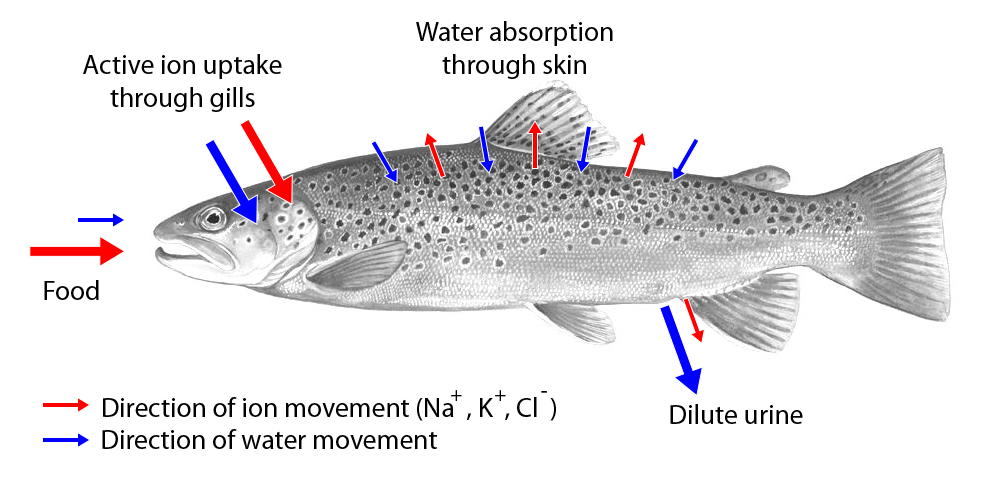
Movement of water and ions in freshwater fish

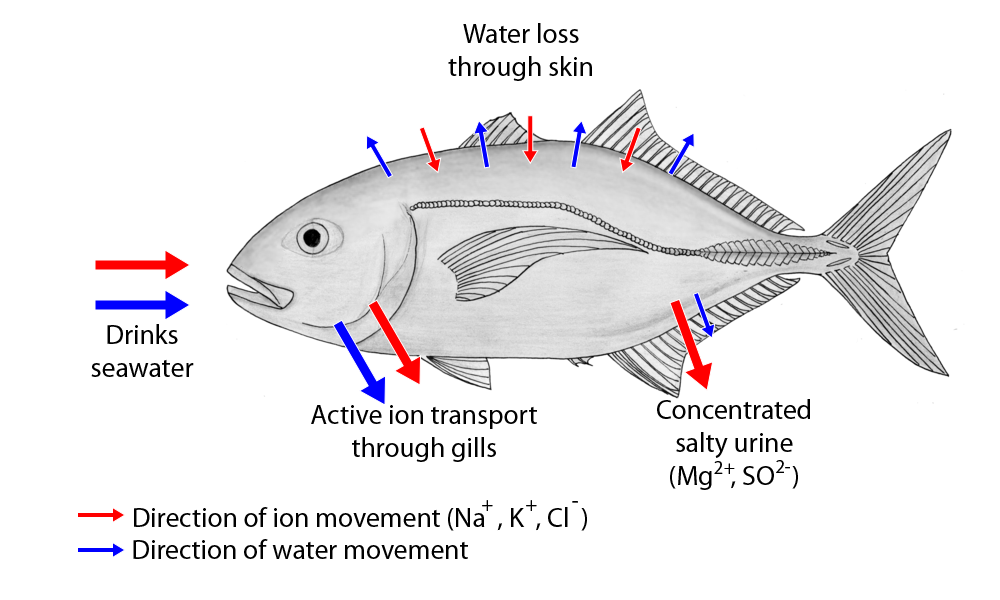
Movement of water and ions in saltwater fish

Two major types of osmoregulation are osmoconformers and osmoregulators. Osmoconformers match their body osmolarity to their environment actively or passively. Most marine invertebrates are osmoconformers, although their ionic composition may be different from that of seawater. In a strictly osmoregulating animal, the amounts of internal salt and water are held relatively constant in the face of environmental changes. It requires that intake and outflow of water and salts be equal over an extended period of time. Organisms that maintain an internal osmolarity different from the medium in which they are immersed have been termed osmoregulators. They tightly regulate their body osmolarity, maintaining constant internal conditions. They are more common in the animal kingdom. Osmoregulators actively control internal salt concentrations despite the salt concentrations in the environment. An example is freshwater fish. The gills actively uptake salt from the environment by the use of mitochondria-rich cells. Water will diffuse into the fish, so it excretes a very hypotonic (dilute) urine to expel all the excess water. A marine fish has an internal osmotic concentration lower than that of the surrounding seawater, so it tends to lose water and gain salt. It actively excretes salt out from the gills. Most fish are stenohaline, which means they are restricted to either salt or fresh water and cannot survive in water with a different salt concentration than they are adapted to. However, some fish show an ability to effectively osmoregulate across a broad range of salinities; fish with this ability are known as euryhaline species, e.g., flounder. Flounder have been observed to inhabit two disparate environments—marine and fresh water—and it is inherent to adapt to both by bringing in behavioral and physiological modifications.

Some marine fish, like sharks, have adopted a different, efficient mechanism to conserve water. They retain urea in their blood in relatively higher concentration. Urea damages living tissues, so to cope with this problem, some fish retain trimethylamine oxide, which helps to counteract urea's destabilizing effects on cells. Sharks, having slightly higher solute concentration (i.e., above 1000 mOsm which is sea solute concentration), do not drink water like fresh water fish.

== In plants ==
While there are no specific osmoregulatory organs in higher plants, the stomata are important in regulating water loss through evapotranspiration, and on the cellular level the vacuole is crucial in regulating the concentration of solutes in the cytoplasm. Strong winds, low humidity and high temperatures all increase evapotranspiration from leaves. Abscisic acid is an important hormone in helping plants to conserve water—it causes stomata to close and stimulates root growth so that more water can be absorbed.

Plants share with animals the problems of obtaining water but, unlike in animals, the loss of water in plants is crucial to create a driving force to move nutrients from the soil to tissues. Certain plants have evolved methods of water conservation.

Xerophytes are plants that can survive in dry habitats, such as deserts, and are able to withstand prolonged periods of water shortage. Succulent plants such as the cacti store water in the vacuoles of large parenchyma tissues. Other plants have leaf modifications to reduce water loss, such as needle-shaped leaves, sunken stomata, and thick, waxy cuticles as in the pine. The sand-dune marram grass has rolled leaves with stomata on the inner surface.

Hydrophytes are plants that grow in aquatic habitats; they may be floating, submerged, or emergent, and may grow in seasonal (rather than permanent) wetlands. In these plants the water absorption may occur through the whole surface of the plant, e.g., the water lily, or solely through the roots, as in sedges. These plants do not face major osmoregulatory challenges from water scarcity, but aside from species adapted for seasonal wetlands, have few defenses against desiccation.

Halophytes are plants living in soils with high salt concentrations, such as salt marshes or alkaline soils in desert basins. They have to absorb water from such a soil which has higher salt concentration and therefore lower water potential(higher osmotic pressure). Halophytes cope with this situation by activating salts in their roots. As a consequence, the cells of the roots develop lower water potential which brings in water by osmosis. The excess salt can be stored in cells or excreted out from salt glands on leaves. The salt thus secreted by some species (such as glasswort and cord-grass) help them to trap water vapours from the air, which is absorbed in liquid by leaf cells. Therefore, this is another way of obtaining additional water from air.

Mesophytes are plants living in lands of temperate zone, which grow in well-watered soil. They can easily compensate the water lost by transpiration through absorbing water from the soil. To prevent excessive transpiration they have developed a waterproof external covering called cuticle.

== In animals and humans ==
=== Humans ===
Kidneys play a very large role in human osmoregulation by regulating the amount of water reabsorbed from glomerular filtrate in kidney tubules, which is controlled by hormones such as antidiuretic hormone (ADH), aldosterone, and angiotensin II. For example, a decrease in water potential is detected by osmoreceptors in the hypothalamus, which stimulates ADH release from the pituitary gland to increase the permeability of the walls of the collecting ducts in the kidneys. Therefore, a large proportion of water is reabsorbed from fluid in the kidneys to prevent too much water from being excreted.

=== Marine mammals ===
Drinking is not common behavior in pinnipeds and cetaceans. Water balance is maintained in marine mammals by metabolic and dietary water, while accidental ingestion and dietary salt may help maintain homeostasis of electrolytes. The kidneys of pinnipeds and cetaceans are lobed in structure, unlike those of most terrestrial mammals, but this specific adaptation does not confer any greater concentrating ability. Unlike most other aquatic mammals, manatees frequently drink fresh water and sea otters frequently drink saltwater.

=== Teleosts ===
In teleost (advanced ray-finned) fishes, the gills, kidney and digestive tract are involved in maintenance of body fluid balance, as the main osmoregulatory organs. Gills in particular are considered the primary organ by which ionic concentration is controlled in marine teleosts.

Unusually, the catfishes in the eeltail family Plotosidae have an extra-branchial salt-secreting dendritic organ. The dendritic organ is likely a product of convergent evolution with other vertebrate salt-secreting organs. The role of this organ was discovered by its high NKA and NKCC activity in response to increasing salinity. However, the Plotosidae dendritic organ may be of limited use under extreme salinity conditions, compared to more typical gill-based ionoregulation.

== In protists ==
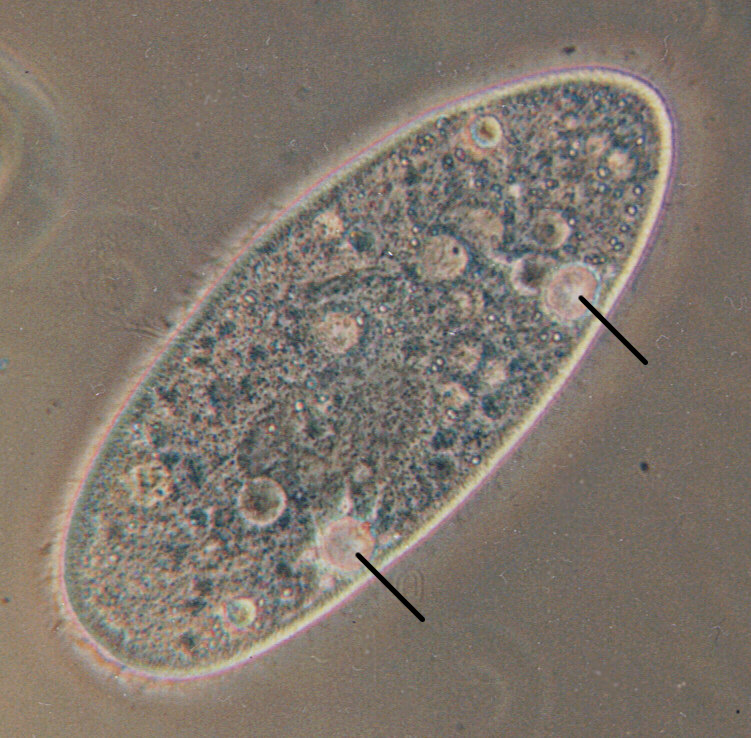
Protist Paramecium aurelia with contractile vacuoles.

Amoeba makes use of contractile vacuoles to collect excretory wastes, such as ammonia, from the intracellular fluid by diffusion and active transport. As osmotic action pushes water from the environment into the cytoplasm, the vacuole moves to the surface and pumps the contents into the environment.

== In bacteria ==
Bacteria respond to osmotic stress by rapidly accumulating electrolytes or small organic solutes via transporters whose activities are stimulated by increases in osmolarity. The bacteria may also turn on genes encoding transporters of osmolytes and enzymes that synthesize osmoprotectants. The EnvZ/OmpR two-component system, which regulates the expression of porins, is well characterized in the model organism E. coli.

== Vertebrate excretory systems ==
=== Waste products of the nitrogen metabolism ===
Ammonia is a toxic by-product of protein metabolism and is generally converted to less toxic substances after it is produced then excreted; mammals convert ammonia to urea, whereas birds and reptiles form uric acid to be excreted with other wastes via their cloacas.

=== Achieving osmoregulation in vertebrates ===
Four processes occur:

- Filtration – fluid portion of blood (plasma) is filtered from a nephron (functional unit of vertebrate kidney) structure known as the glomerulus into Bowman's capsule or glomerular capsule (in the kidney's cortex) and flows down the proximal convoluted tubule to a "u-turn" called the Loop of Henle (loop of the nephron) in the medulla portion of the kidney.
- Reabsorption – most of the viscous glomerular filtrate is returned to blood vessels that surround the convoluted tubules.
- Secretion – the remaining fluid becomes urine, which travels down collecting ducts to the medullary region of the kidney.
- Excretion – the urine (in mammals) is stored in the urinary bladder and exits via the urethra; in other vertebrates, the urine mixes with other wastes in the cloaca before leaving the body (frogs also have a urinary bladder).

== See also ==
- Euryhaline – Term describing organisms able to adapt to a wide range of salinities
- Halotolerance – Adaptation of living organisms to conditions of high salinity
- Osmoconformer – Marine organism
- Osmotic concentration – Molarity of osmotically active particles
- Salt gland – Organ for excreting excess salt
- Stenohaline – Term describing organisms that cannot tolerate a wide range of salinities
- Tissue hydration
