= Aurantiacicella =

Scientific classification
- Domain: Bacteria
- Kingdom: Pseudomonadati
- Phylum: Bacteroidota
- Class: Flavobacteriia
- Order: Flavobacteriales
- Family: Flavobacteriaceae
- Genus: Aurantiacicella; Teramoto et al. 2016

Type species
- Aurantiacicella marina

Species
- A. marina

Genus of bacteria

Aurantiacicella is a myxol-producing, Gram-negative, aerobic, rod-shaped, mesophilic and non-motile genus of bacteria from the family of Flavobacteriaceae with one known species (Aurantiacicella marina). Aurantiacicella marina has been isolated from seawater from the Muroto city in Japan.
