= Aureitalea =

Scientific classification
- Domain: Bacteria
- Kingdom: Pseudomonadati
- Phylum: Bacteroidota
- Class: Flavobacteriia
- Order: Flavobacteriales
- Family: Flavobacteriaceae
- Genus: Aureitalea; Park et al., 2012
- Species: A. marina

Binomial name
- Aureitalea marina Park et al., 2012

Genus of bacteria

Aureitalea is a Gram-negative, obligately aerobic and heterotrophic genus of bacteria from the family of Flavobacteriaceae with one known species, Aureitalea marina. A. marina has been isolated from seawater from the western North Pacific Ocean.
