= Aureivirga =

Scientific classification
- Domain: Bacteria
- Kingdom: Pseudomonadati
- Phylum: Bacteroidota
- Class: Flavobacteriia
- Order: Flavobacteriales
- Family: Flavobacteriaceae
- Genus: Aureivirga; Haber et al. 2013

Type species
- Aureivirga marina

Species
- A. marina

Genus of bacteria

Aureivirga is a Gram-negative, aerobic and non-motile genus of bacteria from the family of Flavobacteriaceae with one known species (Aureivirga marina). Aureivirga marina has been isolated from the sponge Axinella verrucosa from the coast near Sdot Yam.
