= Acaryochloris marina =

Scientific classification
- Domain: Bacteria
- Kingdom: Bacillati
- Phylum: Cyanobacteriota
- Class: Cyanophyceae
- Order: Synechococcales
- Family: Acaryochloridaceae; Komárek et al. 2014
- Genus: Acaryochloris; Miyashita & Chihara 2003
- Species: A. marina

Binomial name
- Acaryochloris marina Miyashita & Chihara, 2003

Species of bacterium

Chlorophyll d

Acaryochloris marina is a species of unicellular Cyanobacteria that produces chlorophyll d as its primary pigment (instead of the typically used chlorophyll a), allowing it to photosynthesize using far-red light, at 700-750 nm wavelength. A. marina is found in temperate and tropic marine environments. Strains of A. marina have been isolated from multiple environments, including as epiphytes of red algae, associated with tunicates, and from rocks in intertidal zones (i.e. epilithic).

== Description ==
It was first discovered in 1993 from coastal isolates of coral in the Republic of Palau in the west Pacific Ocean and announced in 1996. Despite the claim in the 1996 Nature paper that its formal description was to be published shortly thereafter, a tentative partial description was presented in 2003 due to phylogenetic issues (deep branching cyanobacterium).

== Genome ==
Its genome was first sequenced in 2008, revealing a large bacterial genome of 8.3 Mb with nine plasmids.

== Etymology ==
The name Acaryochloris is a combination of the Greek prefix a (ἄν) meaning "without", caryo (κάρυον) meaning "nut" (here intended as "nucleus") and chloros (χλωρός) meaning green; therefore it is Neo-Latin Acaryochloris meaning "without nucleus green". The specific epithet marina is Latin meaning "marine".

== Classification ==
Due to historical reason, the classification of the Cyanobacteria is problematic and many are not validly published, meaning they have not yet been placed into the classification framework. One of these not officially recognised species is Acaryochloris marina, which technically should be written as "Acaryochloris marina" in official writings, but in effect this is rarely done (cf.)

== Exoplanet habitability ==
Scientists including NASA's Nancy Kiang have proposed that the existence of Acaryochloris marina suggests that organisms that use chlorophyll d, rather than chlorophyll a, may be able to perform oxygenic photosynthesis on exoplanets orbiting red dwarf stars (which emit much less light than the Sun). Because about 70% of the stars in the Milky Way galaxy are red dwarfs, the existence of A. marina implies that oxygenic photosynthesis may be occurring on far more exoplanets than astrobiologists initially thought possible.

== See also ==
- Prochlorococcus
