= Fish physiology =

Scientific study of how the component parts of fish function together in the living fish

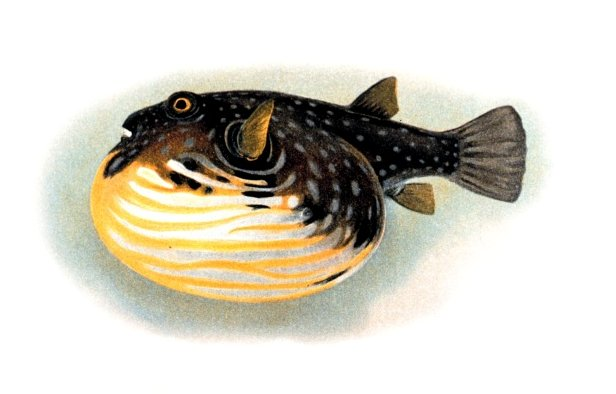
When threatened, the toxic pufferfish fills its extremely elastic stomach with water.

Fish physiology is the scientific study of how the component parts of fish function together in the living fish. It can be contrasted with fish anatomy, which is the study of the form or morphology of fishes. In practice, fish anatomy and physiology complement each other, the former dealing with the structure of a fish, its organs or component parts and how they are put together, such as might be observed on the dissecting table or under the microscope, and the latter dealing with how those components function together in the living fish.

== Respiration ==
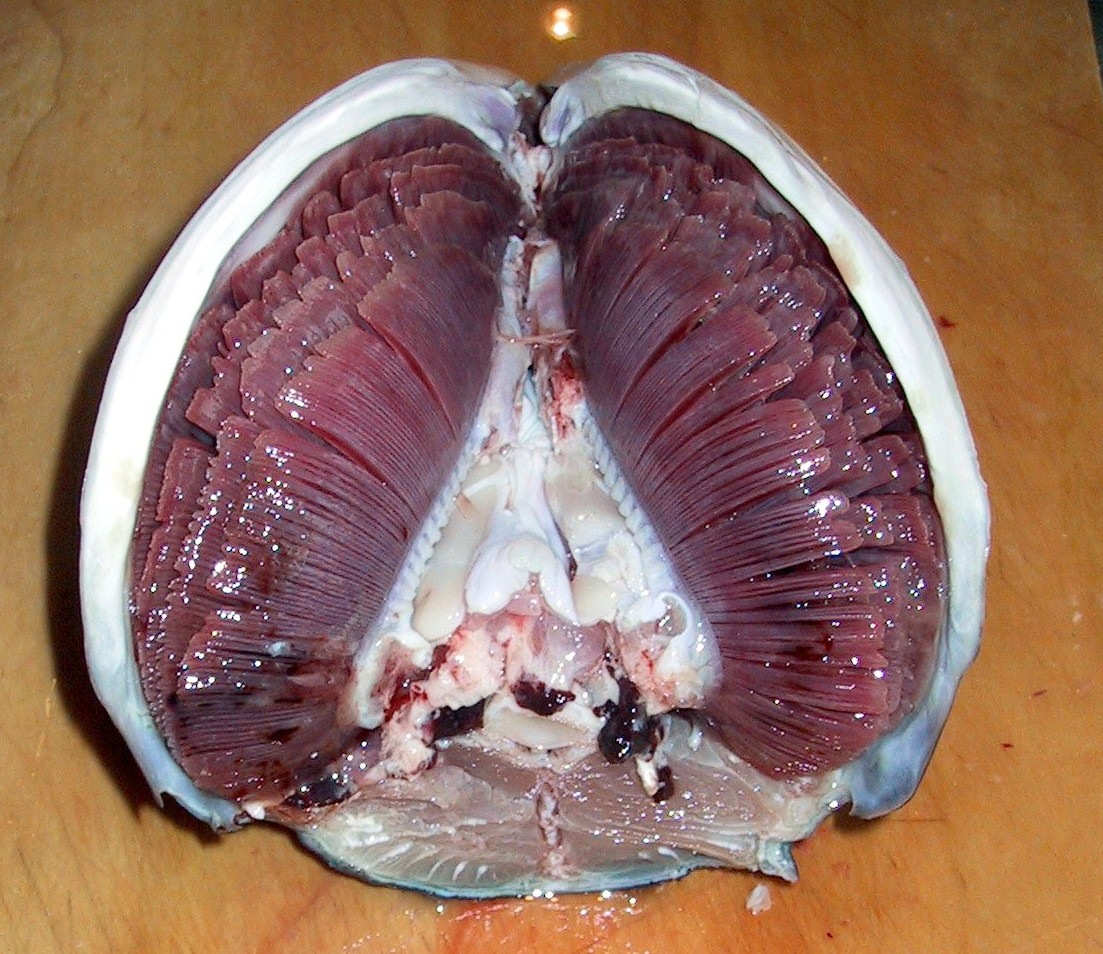
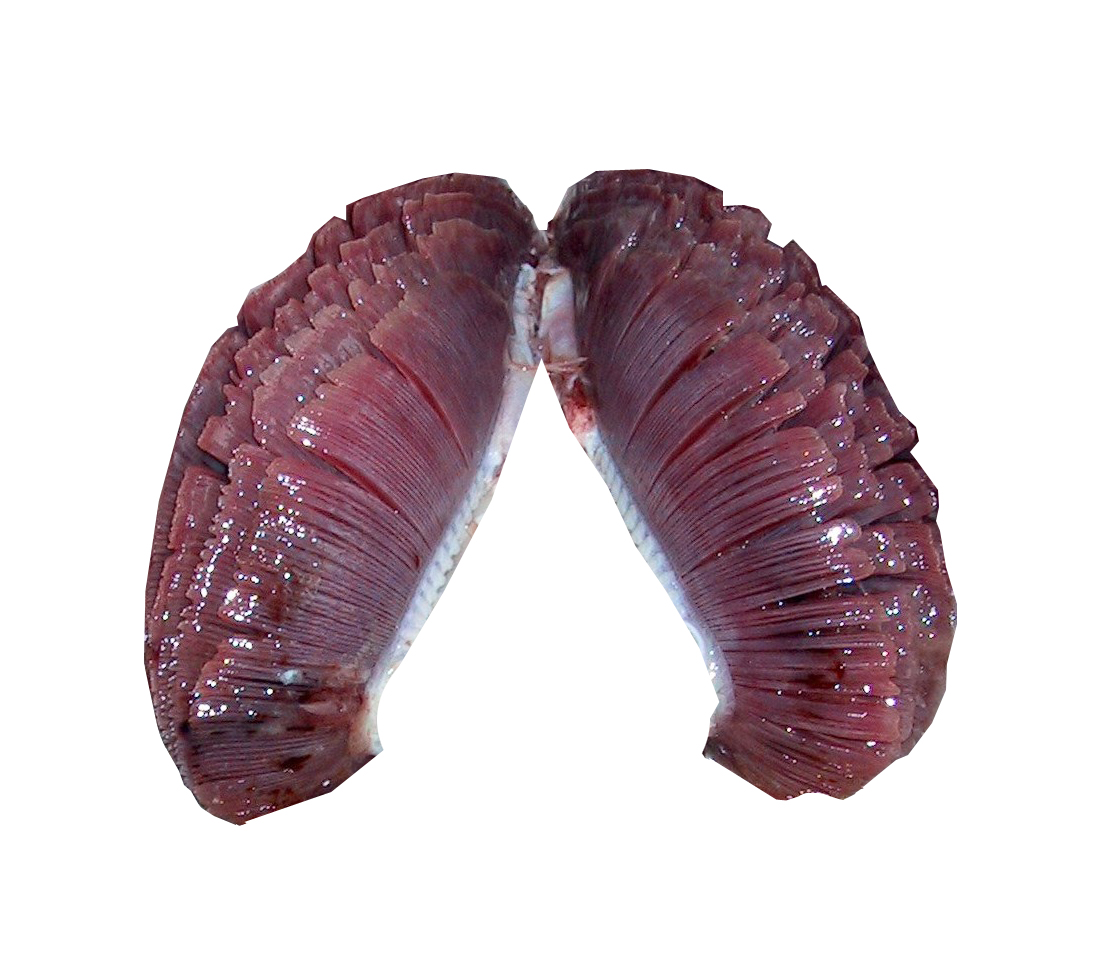
Gills inside the head of a tuna. The head is snout-down, with the view looking towards the mouth. On the right are the detached gills.

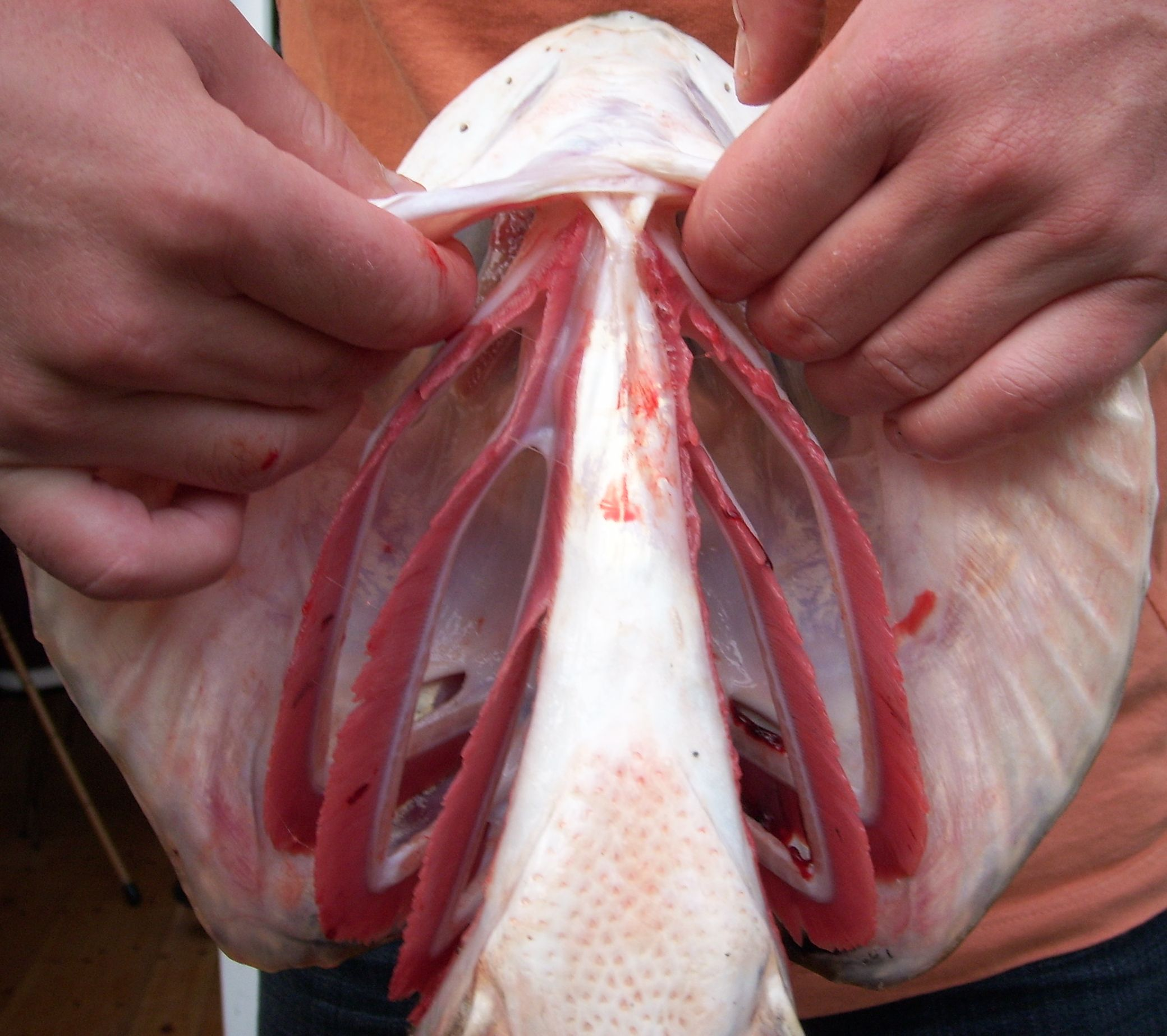
Gill arches bearing gills in a pike

Most fish exchange gases using gills on either side of the pharynx (throat). Gills are tissues which consist of threadlike structures called filaments. These filaments have many functions and "are involved in ion and water transfer as well as oxygen, carbon dioxide, acid and ammonia exchange. Each filament contains a capillary network that provides a large surface area for exchanging oxygen and carbon dioxide. Fish exchange gases by pulling oxygen-rich water through their mouths and pumping it over their gills. In some fish, capillary blood flows in the opposite direction to the water, causing countercurrent exchange. The gills push the oxygen-poor water out through openings in the sides of the pharynx.

Fish from multiple groups can live out of the water for extended time periods. Amphibious fish such as the mudskipper can live and move about on land for up to several days, or live in stagnant or otherwise oxygen depleted water. Many such fish can breathe air via a variety of mechanisms. The skin of anguillid eels may absorb oxygen directly. The buccal cavity of the electric eel may breathe air. Catfish of the families Loricariidae, Callichthyidae, and Scoloplacidae absorb air through their digestive tracts. Lungfish, with the exception of the Australian lungfish, and bichirs have paired lungs similar to those of tetrapods and must surface to gulp fresh air through the mouth and pass spent air out through the gills. Gar and bowfin have a vascularized swim bladder that functions in the same way. Loaches, trahiras, and many catfish breathe by passing air through the gut. Mudskippers breathe by absorbing oxygen across the skin (similar to frogs). A number of fish have evolved so-called accessory breathing organs that extract oxygen from the air. Labyrinth fish (such as gouramis and bettas) have a labyrinth organ above the gills that performs this function. A few other fish have structures resembling labyrinth organs in form and function, most notably snakeheads, pikeheads, and the Clariidae catfish family.

Breathing air is primarily of use to fish that inhabit shallow, seasonally variable waters where the water's oxygen concentration may seasonally decline. Fish dependent solely on dissolved oxygen, such as perch and cichlids, quickly suffocate, while air-breathers survive for much longer, in some cases in water that is little more than wet mud. At the most extreme, some air-breathing fish are able to survive in damp burrows for weeks without water, entering a state of aestivation (summertime hibernation) until water returns.

Air breathing fish can be divided into obligate air breathers and facultative air breathers. Obligate air breathers, such as the African lungfish, are obligated to breathe air periodically or they suffocate. Facultative air breathers, such as the catfish Hypostomus plecostomus, only breathe air if they need to and can otherwise rely on their gills for oxygen. Most air breathing fish are facultative air breathers that avoid the energetic cost of rising to the surface and the fitness cost of exposure to surface predators.

Cocurrent and countercurrent flow exchange systems Red represents a higher value (e.g. of temperature or the partial pressure of a gas) than blue so the property being transported in the channels flows from red to blue. In fish a countercurrent flow (lower diagram) of blood and water in the gills is used to extract oxygen from the environment.

All basal vertebrates breathe with gills. The gills are carried right behind the head, bordering the posterior margins of a series of openings from the esophagus to the exterior. Each gill is supported by a cartilaginous or bony gill arch. The gills of vertebrates typically develop in the walls of the pharynx, along a series of gill slits opening to the exterior. Most species employ a countercurrent exchange system to enhance the diffusion of substances in and out of the gill, with blood and water flowing in opposite directions to each other, which increases the efficiency of oxygen-uptake from the water. Fresh oxygenated water taken in through the mouth is uninterruptedly "pumped" through the gills in one direction, while the blood in the lamellae flows in the opposite direction, creating the countercurrent blood and water flow, on which the fish's survival depends.

The gills are composed of comb-like filaments, the gill lamellae, which help increase their surface area for oxygen exchange. When a fish breathes, it draws in a mouthful of water at regular intervals. Then it draws the sides of its throat together, forcing the water through the gill openings, so that it passes over the gills to the outside. The bony fish have three pairs of arches, cartilaginous fish have five to seven pairs, while the primitive jawless fish have seven. The vertebrate ancestor no doubt had more arches, as some of their chordate relatives have more than 50 pairs of gills.

Higher vertebrates do not develop gills, the gill arches form during fetal development, and lay the basis of essential structures such as jaws, the thyroid gland, the larynx, the columella (corresponding to the stapes in mammals) and in mammals the malleus and incus. Fish gill slits may be the evolutionary ancestors of the tonsils, thymus gland, and Eustachian tubes, as well as many other structures derived from the embryonic branchial pouches.

Scientists have investigated what part of the body is responsible for maintaining the respiratory rhythm. They found that neurons located in the brainstem of fish are responsible for the genesis of the respiratory rhythm. The position of these neurons is slightly different from the centers of respiratory genesis in mammals but they are located in the same brain compartment, which has caused debates about the homology of respiratory centers between aquatic and terrestrial species. In both aquatic and terrestrial respiration, the exact mechanisms by which neurons can generate this involuntary rhythm are still not completely understood (see Involuntary control of respiration).

Another important feature of the respiratory rhythm is that it is modulated to adapt to the oxygen consumption of the body. As observed in mammals, fish "breathe" faster and heavier when they do physical exercise. The mechanisms by which these changes occur have been strongly debated over more than 100 years between scientists. The authors can be classified in 2 schools:

1. Those who think that the major part of the respiratory changes are pre-programmed in the brain, which would imply that neurons from locomotion centers of the brain connect to respiratory centers in anticipation of movements.
2. Those who think that the major part of the respiratory changes result from the detection of muscle contraction, and that respiration is adapted as a consequence of muscular contraction and oxygen consumption. This would imply that the brain possesses some kind of detection mechanisms that would trigger a respiratory response when muscular contraction occurs.

Many now agree that both mechanisms are probably present and complementary, or working alongside a mechanism that can detect changes in oxygen and/or carbon dioxide blood saturation.

=== Bony fish ===
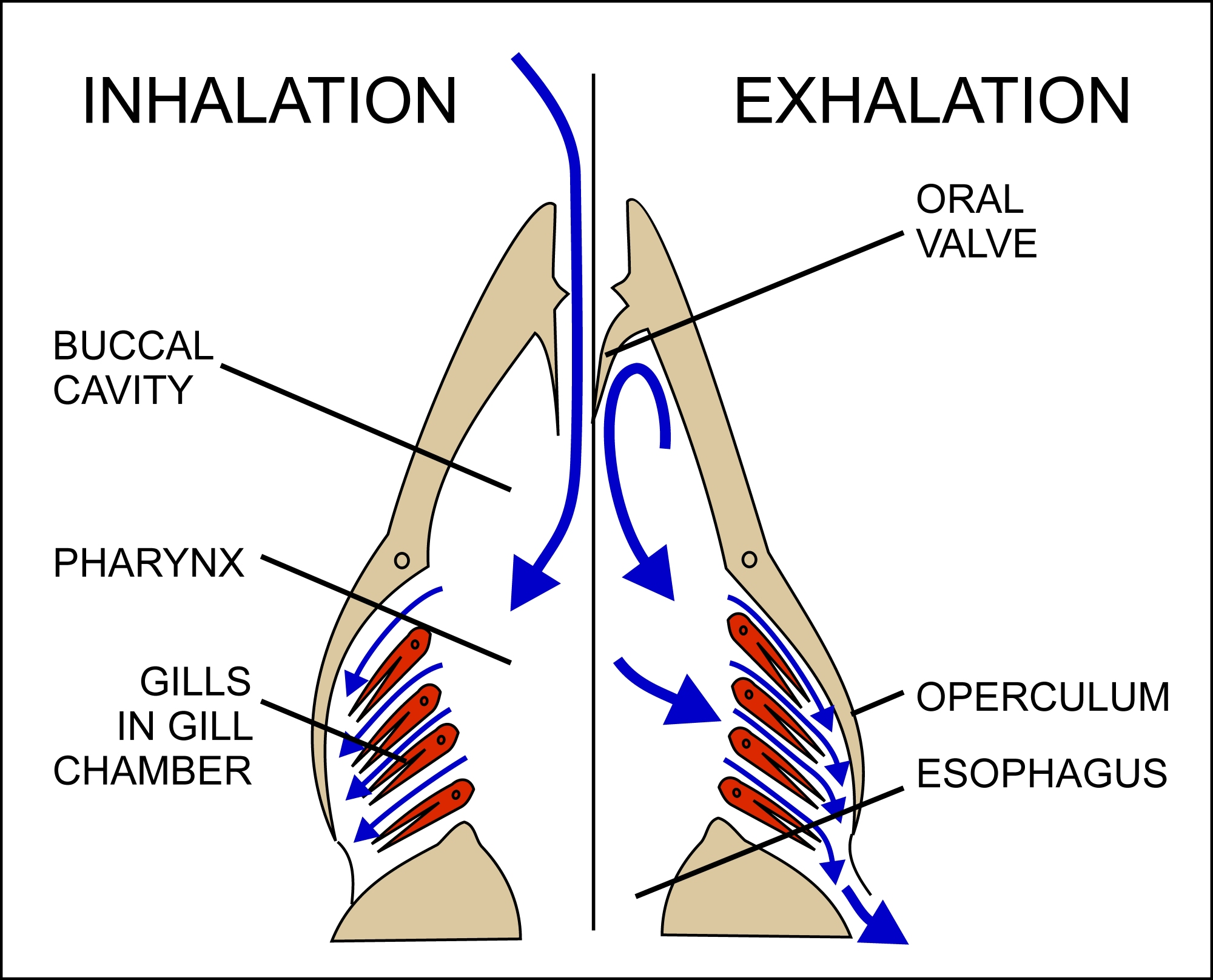
Respiratory mechanism in bony fish The fish draws oxygen-rich water in through the mouth (left). It then pumps it over gills so oxygen enters the bloodstream, and allows oxygen-depleted water to exit through the gill slits (right)

In bony fish, the gills lie in a branchial chamber covered by a bony operculum. The great majority of bony fish species have five pairs of gills, although a few have lost some over the course of evolution. The operculum can be important in adjusting the pressure of water inside of the pharynx to allow proper ventilation of the gills, so that bony fish do not have to rely on ram ventilation (and hence near constant motion) to breathe. Valves inside the mouth keep the water from escaping.

The gill arches of bony fish typically have no septum, so that the gills alone project from the arch, supported by individual gill rays. Some species retain gill rakers. Though all but the most primitive bony fish lack a spiracle, the pseudobranch associated with it often remains, being located at the base of the operculum. This is, however, often greatly reduced, consisting of a small mass of cells without any remaining gill-like structure.

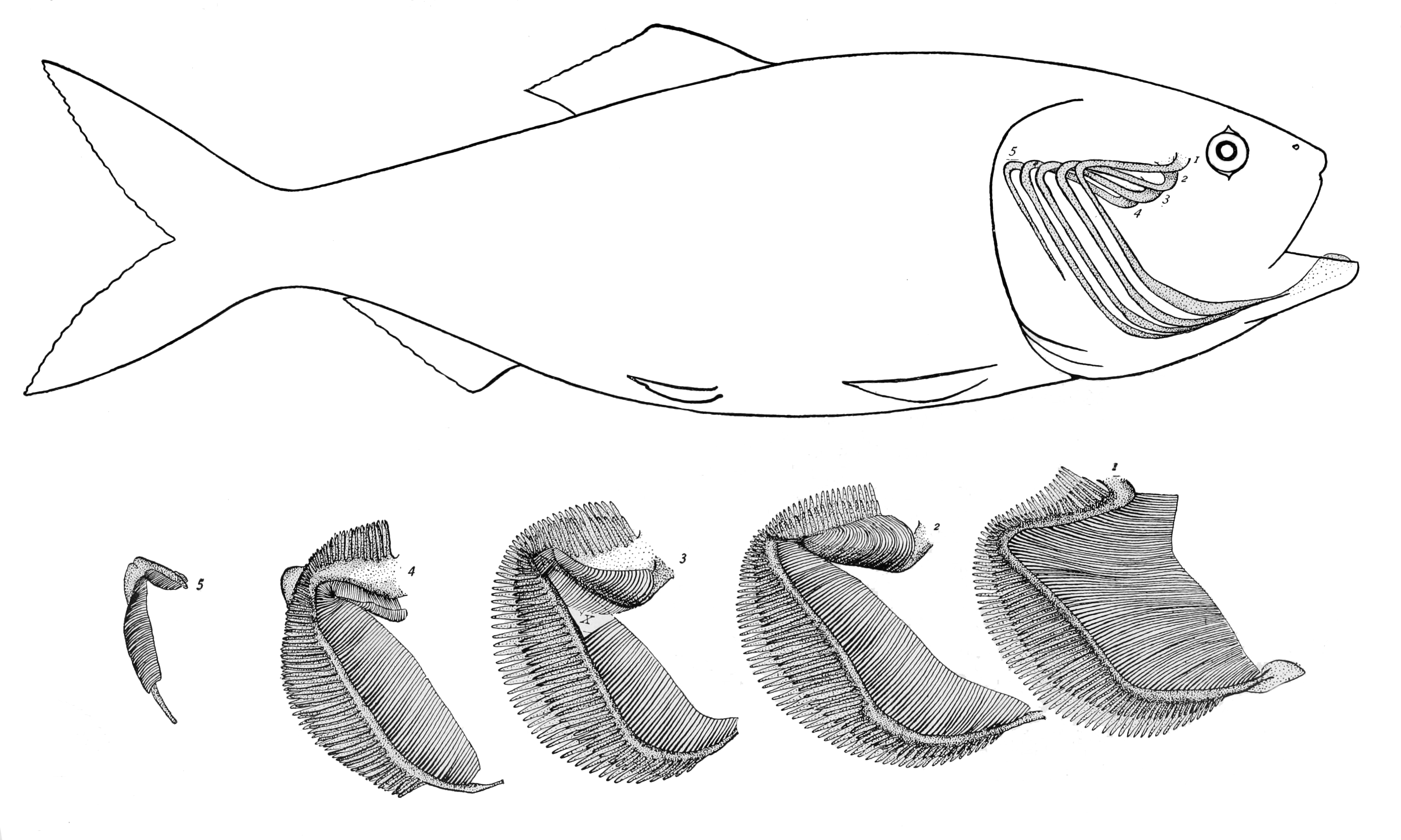
Most bony fish have five gills

Marine teleosts also use gills to excrete electrolytes. The gills' large surface area tends to create a problem for fish that seek to regulate the osmolarity of their internal fluids. Saltwater is less dilute than these internal fluids, so saltwater fish lose large quantities of water osmotically through their gills. To regain the water, they drink large amounts of seawater and excrete the salt. Freshwater is more dilute than the internal fluids of fish, however, so freshwater fish gain water osmotically through their gills.

In some primitive bony fishes and amphibians, the larvae bear external gills, branching off from the gill arches. These are reduced in adulthood, their function taken over by the gills proper in fishes and by lungs in most amphibians. Some amphibians retain the external larval gills in adulthood, the complex internal gill system as seen in fish apparently being irrevocably lost very early in the evolution of tetrapods.

=== Cartilaginous fish ===
Like other fish, sharks extract oxygen from seawater as it passes over their gills. Unlike other fish, shark gill slits are not covered, but lie in a row behind the head. A modified slit called a spiracle lies just behind the eye, which assists the shark with taking in water during respiration and plays a major role in bottom–dwelling sharks. Spiracles are reduced or missing in active pelagic sharks. While the shark is moving, water passes through the mouth and over the gills in a process known as "ram ventilation". While at rest, most sharks pump water over their gills to ensure a constant supply of oxygenated water. A small number of species have lost the ability to pump water through their gills and must swim without rest. These species are obligate ram ventilators and would presumably asphyxiate if unable to move. Obligate ram ventilation is also true of some pelagic bony fish species.

The respiration and circulation process begins when deoxygenated blood travels to the shark's two-chambered heart. Here the shark pumps blood to its gills via the ventral aorta artery where it branches into afferent brachial arteries. Reoxygenation takes place in the gills and the reoxygenated blood flows into the efferent brachial arteries, which come together to form the dorsal aorta. The blood flows from the dorsal aorta throughout the body. The deoxygenated blood from the body then flows through the posterior cardinal veins and enters the posterior cardinal sinuses. From there blood enters the heart ventricle and the cycle repeats.

Sharks and rays typically have five pairs of gill slits that open directly to the outside of the body, though some more primitive sharks have six or seven pairs. Adjacent slits are separated by a cartilaginous gill arch from which projects a long sheet-like septum, partly supported by a further piece of cartilage called the gill ray. The individual lamellae of the gills lie on either side of the septum. The base of the arch may also support gill rakers, small projecting elements that help to filter food from the water.

A smaller opening, the spiracle, lies in the back of the first gill slit. This bears a small pseudobranch that resembles a gill in structure, but only receives blood already oxygenated by the true gills. The spiracle is thought to be homologous to the ear opening in higher vertebrates.

Most sharks rely on ram ventilation, forcing water into the mouth and over the gills by rapidly swimming forward. In slow-moving or bottom dwelling species, especially among skates and rays, the spiracle may be enlarged, and the fish breathes by sucking water through this opening, instead of through the mouth.

Chimaeras differ from other cartilagenous fish, having lost both the spiracle and the fifth gill slit. The remaining slits are covered by an operculum, developed from the septum of the gill arch in front of the first gill.

=== Lampreys and hagfish ===
Lampreys and hagfish do not have gill slits as such. Instead, the gills are contained in spherical pouches, with a circular opening to the outside. Like the gill slits of higher fish, each pouch contains two gills. In some cases, the openings may be fused together, effectively forming an operculum. Lampreys have seven pairs of pouches, while hagfishes may have six to fourteen, depending on the species. In the hagfish, the pouches connect with the pharynx internally. In adult lampreys, a separate respiratory tube develops beneath the pharynx proper, separating food and water from respiration by closing a valve at its anterior end.

== Circulation ==
Two-chambered heart of a fish

The circulatory systems of all vertebrates are closed, just as in humans. Still, the systems of fish, amphibians, reptiles, and birds show various stages of the evolution of the circulatory system. In fish, the system has only one circuit, with the blood being pumped through the capillaries of the gills and on to the capillaries of the body tissues. This is known as single cycle circulation. The heart of fish is therefore only a single pump (consisting of two chambers). Fish have a closed-loop circulatory system. The heart pumps the blood in a single loop throughout the body. In most fish, the heart consists of four parts, including two chambers and an entrance and exit. The first part is the sinus venosus, a thin-walled sac that collects blood from the fish's veins before allowing it to flow to the second part, the atrium, which is a large muscular chamber. The atrium serves as a one-way antechamber, sends blood to the third part, ventricle. The ventricle is another thick-walled, muscular chamber and it pumps the blood, first to the fourth part, bulbus arteriosus, a large tube, and then out of the heart. The bulbus arteriosus connects to the aorta, through which blood flows to the gills for oxygenation.

In amphibians and most reptiles, a double circulatory system is used, but the heart is not always completely separated into two pumps. Amphibians have a three-chambered heart.

== Digestion ==
Jaws allow fish to eat a wide variety of food, including plants and other organisms. Fish ingest food through the mouth and break it down in the esophagus. In the stomach, food is further digested and, in many fish, processed in finger-shaped pouches called pyloric caeca, which secrete digestive enzymes and absorb nutrients. Organs such as the liver and pancreas add enzymes and various chemicals as the food moves through the digestive tract. The intestine completes the process of digestion and nutrient absorption.

In most vertebrates, digestion is a four-stage process involving the main structures of the digestive tract, starting with ingestion, placing food into the mouth, and concluding with the excretion of undigested material through the anus. From the mouth, the food moves to the stomach, where as bolus it is broken down chemically. It then moves to the intestine, where the process of breaking the food down into simple molecules continues and the results are absorbed as nutrients into the circulatory and lymphatic systems.

Although the precise shape and size of the stomach varies widely among different vertebrates, the relative positions of the oesophageal and duodenal openings remain relatively constant. As a result, the organ always curves somewhat to the left before curving back to meet the pyloric sphincter. However, lampreys, hagfishes, chimaeras, lungfishes, and some teleost fish have no stomach at all, with the oesophagus opening directly into the intestine. These animals all consume diets that either require little storage of food, or no pre-digestion with gastric juices, or both.

The small intestine is the part of the digestive tract following the stomach and followed by the large intestine, and is where much of the digestion and absorption of food takes place. In fish, the divisions of the small intestine are not clear, and the terms anterior or proximal intestine may be used instead of duodenum. The small intestine is found in all teleosts, although its form and length vary enormously between species. In teleosts, it is relatively short, typically around one and a half times the length of the fish's body. It commonly has a number of pyloric caeca, small pouch-like structures along its length that help to increase the overall surface area of the organ for digesting food. There is no ileocaecal valve in teleosts, with the boundary between the small intestine and the rectum being marked only by the end of the digestive epithelium.

There is no small intestine as such in non-teleost fish, such as sharks, sturgeons, and lungfish. Instead, the digestive part of the gut forms a spiral intestine, connecting the stomach to the rectum. In this type of gut, the intestine itself is relatively straight, but has a long fold running along the inner surface in a spiral fashion, sometimes for dozens of turns. This valve greatly increases both the surface area and the effective length of the intestine. The lining of the spiral intestine is similar to that of the small intestine in teleosts and non-mammalian tetrapods. In lampreys, the spiral valve is extremely small, possibly because their diet requires little digestion. Hagfish have no spiral valve at all, with digestion occurring for almost the entire length of the intestine, which is not subdivided into different regions.

The large intestine is the last part of the digestive system normally found in vertebrate animals. Its function is to absorb water from the remaining indigestible food matter, and then to pass useless waste material from the body. In fish, there is no true large intestine, but simply a short rectum connecting the end of the digestive part of the gut to the cloaca. In sharks, this includes a rectal gland that secretes salt to help the animal maintain osmotic balance with the seawater. The gland somewhat resembles a caecum in structure, but is not a homologous structure.

As with many aquatic animals, most fish release their nitrogenous wastes as ammonia. Some of the wastes diffuse through the gills. Blood wastes are filtered by the kidneys.

Saltwater fish tend to lose water because of osmosis. Their kidneys return water to the body. The reverse happens in freshwater fish: they tend to gain water osmotically. Their kidneys produce dilute urine for excretion. Some fish have specially adapted kidneys that vary in function, allowing them to move from freshwater to saltwater.

In sharks, digestion can take a long time. The food moves from the mouth to a J-shaped stomach, where it is stored and initial digestion occurs. Unwanted items may never get past the stomach, and instead the shark either vomits or turns its stomachs inside out and ejects unwanted items from its mouth. One of the biggest differences between the digestive systems of sharks and mammals is that sharks have much shorter intestines. This short length is achieved by the spiral valve with multiple turns within a single short section instead of a long tube-like intestine. The valve provides a long surface area, requiring food to circulate inside the short gut until fully digested, when remaining waste products pass into the cloaca.

== Endocrine system ==
=== Regulation of social behaviour ===
Oxytocin is a group of neuropeptides found in most vertebrates. One form of oxytocin functions as a hormone which is associated with human love. In 2012, researchers injected cichlids from the social species Neolamprologus pulcher, either with this form of isotocin or with a control saline solution. They found isotocin increased "responsiveness to social information", which suggests "it is a key regulator of social behavior that has evolved and endured since ancient times".

=== Effects of pollution ===
Fish can bioaccumulate pollutants that are discharged into waterways. Estrogenic compounds found in pesticides, birth control, plastics, plants, fungi, bacteria, and synthetic drugs leeched into rivers are affecting the endocrine systems of native species. In Boulder, Colorado, white sucker fish found downstream of a municipal waste water treatment plant exhibit impaired or abnormal sexual development. The fish have been exposed to higher levels of estrogen, leading to feminized fish. Males display female reproductive organs, and both sexes have reduced fertility, and a higher hatch mortality.

Freshwater habitats in the United States are widely contaminated by the common pesticide atrazine. There is controversy over the degree to which this pesticide harms the endocrine systems of freshwater fish and amphibians. Non-industry-funded researchers consistently report harmful effects while industry-funded researchers consistently report no harmful effects.

In the marine ecosystem, organochlorine contaminants like pesticides, herbicides (DDT), and chlordan are accumulating within fish tissue and disrupting their endocrine system. High frequencies of infertility and high levels of organochlorines have been found in bonnethead sharks along the Gulf Coast of Florida. These endocrine-disrupting compounds are similar in structure to naturally occurring hormones in fish. They can modulate hormonal interactions in fish by:

- binding to cellular receptors, causing unpredictable and abnormal cell activity
- blocking receptor sites, inhibiting activity
- promoting the creation of extra receptor sites, amplifying the effects of the hormone or compound
- interacting with naturally occurring hormones, changing their shape and impact
- affecting hormone synthesis or metabolism, causing an improper balance or quantity of hormones

== Osmoregulation ==
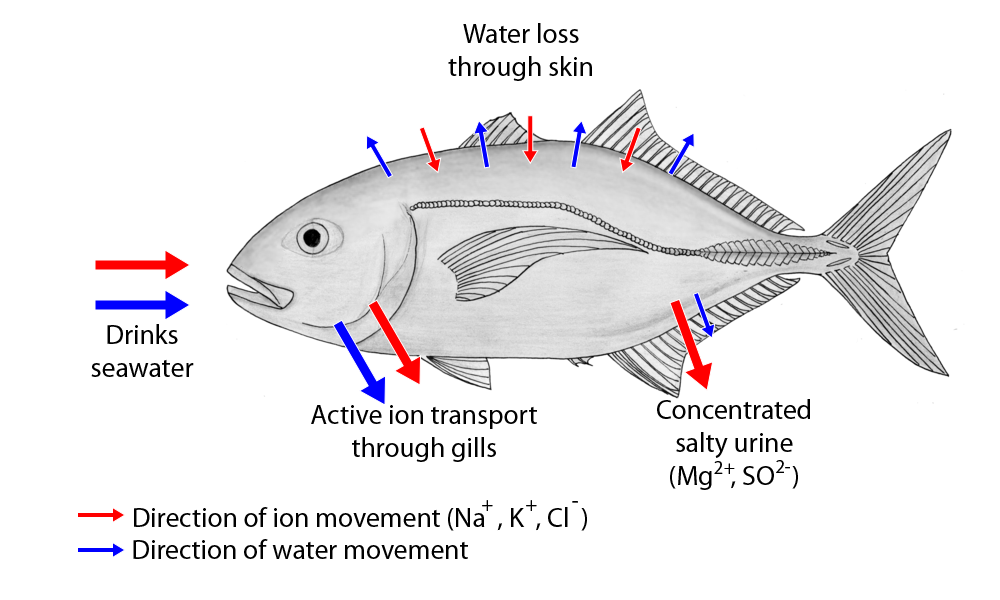
Movement of water and ions in saltwater fish

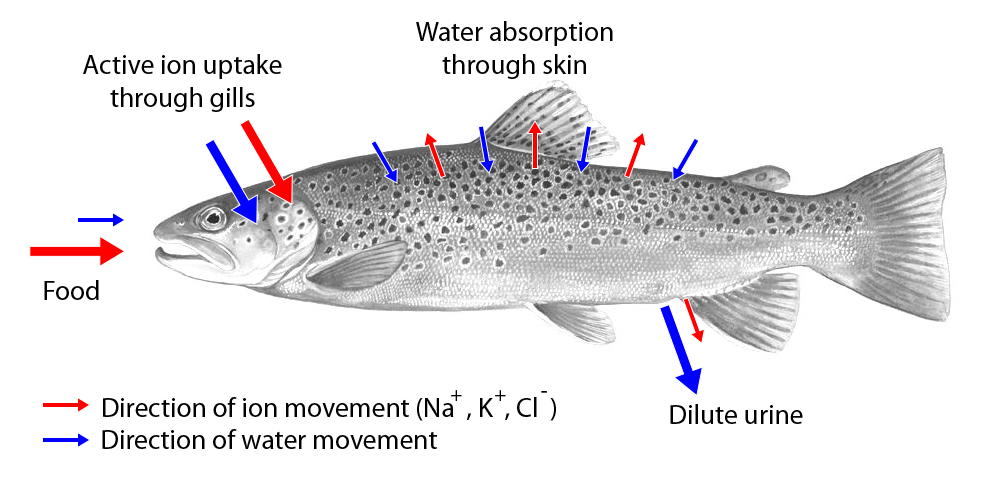
Movement of water and ions in freshwater fish

Two major types of osmoregulation are osmoconformers and osmoregulators. Osmoconformers match their body osmolarity to their environment actively or passively. Most marine invertebrates are osmoconformers, although their ionic composition may be different from that of seawater.

Osmoregulators tightly regulate their body osmolarity, which always stays constant, and are more common in the animal kingdom. Osmoregulators actively control salt concentrations despite the salt concentrations in the environment. An example is freshwater fish. The gills actively uptake salt from the environment by the use of mitochondria-rich cells. Water will diffuse into the fish, so it excretes a very hypotonic (dilute) urine to expel all the excess water. A marine fish has an internal osmotic concentration lower than that of the surrounding seawater, so it tends to lose water and gain salt. It actively excretes salt out of the gills. Most fish are stenohaline, which means they are restricted to either salt or fresh water and cannot survive in water with a different salt concentration than they are adapted to. However, some fish show a tremendous ability to effectively osmoregulate across a broad range of salinities; fish with this ability are known as euryhaline species, e.g., salmon. Salmon has been observed to inhabit two utterly disparate environments – marine and fresh water – and it is inherent to adapt to both by bringing in behavioral and physiological modifications.

In contrast to bony fish, with the exception of the coelacanth, the blood and other tissue of sharks and Chondrichthyes is generally isotonic to their marine environments because of the high concentration of urea and trimethylamine N-oxide (TMAO), allowing them to be in osmotic balance with the seawater. This adaptation prevents most sharks from surviving in freshwater, and they are therefore confined to marine environments. A few exceptions exist, such as the bull shark, which has developed a way to change its kidney function to excrete large amounts of urea. When a shark dies, the urea is broken down to ammonia by bacteria, causing the dead body to gradually smell strongly of ammonia.

Sharks have adopted a different, efficient mechanism to conserve water, i.e., osmoregulation. They retain urea in their blood in relatively higher concentrations. Urea is damaging to living tissue so, to cope with this problem, some fish retain trimethylamine oxide. This provides a better solution to urea's toxicity. Sharks, having slightly higher solute concentrations (i.e., above 1000 mOsm which is sea solute concentration), do not drink water like fresh water fish.

== Thermoregulation ==
Homeothermy and poikilothermy refer to how stable an organism's temperature is. Most endothermic organisms are homeothermic, like mammals. However, animals with facultative endothermy are often poikilothermic, meaning their temperature can vary considerably. Similarly, most fish are ectotherms, as all of their heat comes from the surrounding water. However, most are homeotherms because their temperature is very stable.

Most organisms have a preferred temperature range, however some can be acclimated to temperatures colder or warmer than what they are typically used to. An organism's preferred temperature is typically the temperature at which the organism's physiological processes can act at optimal rates. When fish become acclimated to other temperatures, the efficiency of their physiological processes may decrease but will continue to function. This is called the thermal neutral zone at which an organism can survive indefinitely.

H.M. Vernon has done work on the death temperature and paralysis temperature (temperature of heat rigor) of various animals. He found that species of the same class showed very similar temperature values, those from the Amphibia examined being 38.5 °C, fish 39 °C, Reptilia 45 °C, and various Molluscs 46 °C.

To cope with low temperatures, some fish have developed the ability to remain functional even when the water temperature is below freezing; some use natural antifreeze or antifreeze proteins to resist ice crystal formation in their tissues.

Most sharks are "cold-blooded" or, more precisely, poikilothermic, meaning that their internal body temperature matches that of their ambient environment. Members of the family Lamnidae (such as the shortfin mako shark and the great white shark) are homeothermic and maintain a higher body temperature than the surrounding water. In these sharks, a strip of aerobic red muscle located near the center of the body generates the heat, which the body retains via a countercurrent exchange mechanism by a system of blood vessels called the rete mirabile ("miraculous net"). The common thresher shark has a similar mechanism for maintaining an elevated body temperature, which is thought to have evolved independently.

Tuna can maintain the temperature of certain parts of their body above the temperature of ambient seawater. For example, bluefin tuna maintain a core body temperature of 25–33 °C (77–91 °F), in water as cold as 6 °C (43 °F). However, unlike typical endothermic creatures such as mammals and birds, tuna do not maintain temperature within a relatively narrow range. Tuna achieve endothermy by conserving the heat generated through normal metabolism. The rete mirabile ("wonderful net"), the intertwining of veins and arteries in the body's periphery, transfers heat from venous blood to arterial blood via a counter-current exchange system, thus mitigating the effects of surface cooling. This allows the tuna to elevate the temperatures of the highly aerobic tissues of the skeletal muscles, eyes and brain, which supports faster swimming speeds and reduced energy expenditure, and which enables them to survive in cooler waters over a wider range of ocean environments than those of other fish. In all tunas, however, the heart operates at ambient temperature, as it receives cooled blood, and coronary circulation is directly from the gills.

- Homeothermy: Although most fish are exclusively ectothermic, there are exceptions. Certain species of fish maintain elevated body temperatures. Endothermic teleosts (bony fish) are all in the suborder Scombroidei and include the billfishes, tunas, including a "primitive" mackerel species, Gasterochisma melampus. All sharks in the family Lamnidae – shortfin mako, long fin mako, white, porbeagle, and salmon shark – are endothermic, and evidence suggests the trait exists in family Alopiidae (thresher sharks). The degree of endothermy varies from the billfish, which warm only their eyes and brain, to bluefin tuna and porbeagle sharks who maintain body temperatures elevated in excess of 20 °C (36 °F) above ambient water temperatures. See also gigantothermy. Endothermy, though metabolically costly, is thought to provide advantages such as increased muscle strength, higher rates of central nervous system processing, and higher rates of digestion.

In some fish, a rete mirabile allows for an increase in muscle temperature in regions where this network of vein and arteries is found. The fish is able to thermoregulate certain areas of their body. Additionally, this increase in temperature leads to an increase in basal metabolic temperature. The fish is now able to split ATP at a higher rate and ultimately can swim faster.

The eye of a swordfish can generate heat to better cope with detecting their prey at depths of 600 metres (2,000 feet).

== Muscular system ==
Cross section of a teleost

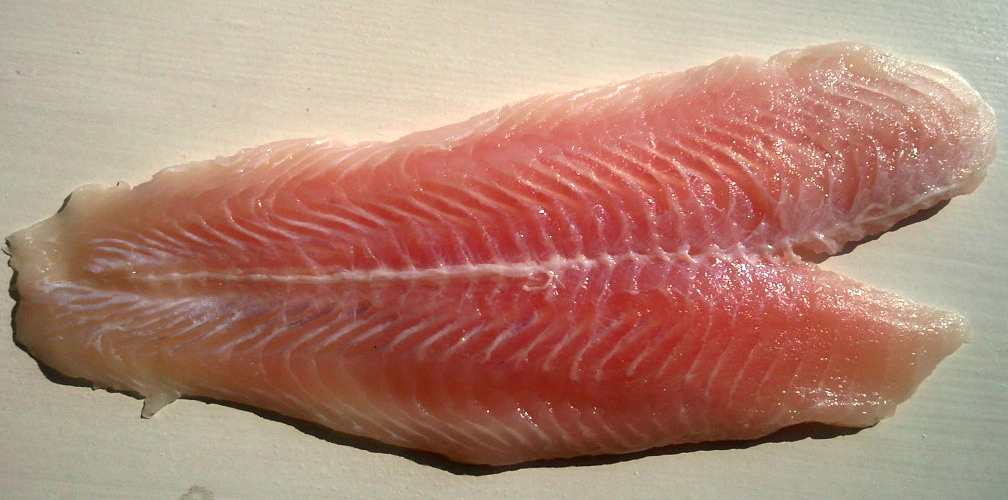
Iridescent shark filets showing myomere structure

Fish swim by contracting longitudinal red muscle and obliquely oriented white muscles. The red muscle is aerobic and needs oxygen which is supplied by myoglobin. The white muscle is anaerobic and it does not need oxygen. Red muscles are used for sustained activity such as cruising at slow speeds on ocean migrations. White muscles are used for bursts of activity, such as jumping or sudden bursts of speed for catching prey.

Mostly fish have white muscles, but the muscles of some fishes, such as scombroids and salmonids, range from pink to dark red. The red myotomal muscles derive their colour from myoglobin, an oxygen-binding molecule, which tuna express in quantities far higher than most other fish. The oxygen-rich blood further enables energy delivery to their muscles.

Most fish move by alternately contracting paired sets of muscles on either side of the backbone. These contractions form S-shaped curves that move down the body. As each curve reaches the back fin, backward force is applied to the water, and in conjunction with the fins, moves the fish forward. The fish's fins function like an airplane's flaps. Fins also increase the tail's surface area, increasing speed. The streamlined body of the fish decreases the amount of friction from the water.

A typical characteristic of many animals that utilize undulatory locomotion is that they have segmented muscles, or blocks of myomeres, running from their head to tails which are separated by connective tissue called myosepta. In addition, some segmented muscle groups, such as the lateral hypaxial musculature in the salamander are oriented at an angle to the longitudinal direction. For these obliquely oriented fibers the strain in the longitudinal direction is greater than the strain in the muscle fiber direction leading to an architectural gear ratio greater than 1. A higher initial angle of orientation and more dorsoventral bulging produces a faster muscle contraction but results in a lower amount of force production. It is hypothesized that animals employ a variable gearing mechanism that allows self-regulation of force and velocity to meet the mechanical demands of the contraction. When a pennate muscle is subjected to a low force, resistance to width changes in the muscle cause it to rotate which consequently produces a higher architectural gear ratio (AGR) (high velocity). However, when subject to a high force, the perpendicular fiber force component overcomes the resistance to width changes and the muscle compresses producing a lower AGR (capable of maintaining a higher force output).

Most fishes bend as a simple, homogenous beam during swimming via contractions of longitudinal red muscle fibers and obliquely oriented white muscle fibers within the segmented axial musculature. The fiber strain (εf) experienced by the longitudinal red muscle fibers is equivalent to the longitudinal strain (εx). The deeper white muscle fibers fishes show diversity in arrangement. These fibers are organized into cone-shaped structures and attach to connective tissue sheets known as myosepta; each fiber shows a characteristic dorsoventral (α) and mediolateral (φ) trajectory. The segmented architecture theory predicts that, εx > εf. This phenomenon results in an architectural gear ratio, determined as longitudinal strain divided by fiber strain (εx / εf), greater than one and longitudinal velocity amplification; furthermore, this emergent velocity amplification may be augmented by variable architectural gearing via mesolateral and dorsoventral shape changes, a pattern seen in pennate muscle contractions. A red-to-white gearing ratio (red εf / white εf) captures the combined effect of the longitudinal red muscle fiber and oblique white muscle fiber strains.

== Buoyancy ==
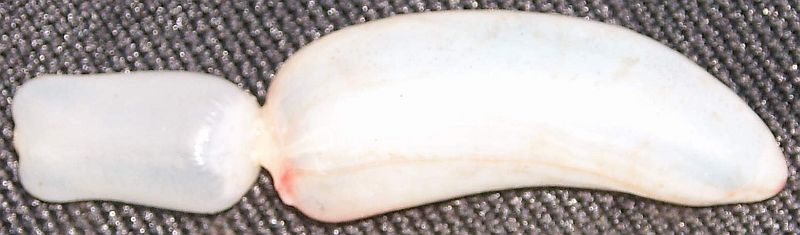
Swim bladder of a common rudd

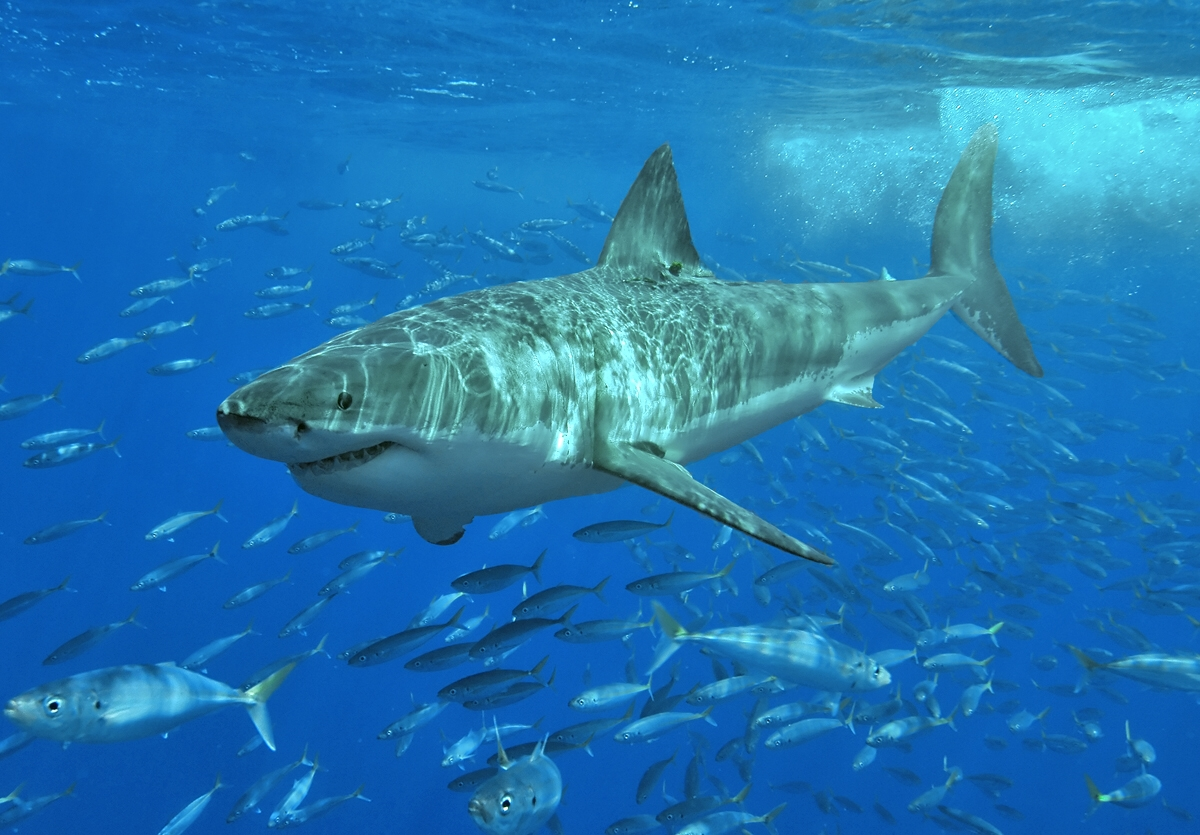
Sharks, like this three tonne great white shark, don't have swim bladders. Most sharks need to keep swimming to avoid sinking.

The body of a fish is denser than water, so fish must compensate for the difference or they will sink. Many bony fishes have an internal organ called a swim bladder, or gas bladder, that adjusts their buoyancy through manipulation of gases. In this way, fish can stay at the current water depth, or ascend or descend without having to waste energy in swimming. The bladder is only found in bony fishes. In the more primitive groups like some minnows, bichirs and lungfish, the bladder is open to the esophagus and double as a lung. It is often absent in fast swimming fishes such as the tuna and mackerel families. The condition of a bladder open to the esophagus is called physostome, the closed condition physoclist. In the latter, the gas content of the bladder is controlled through the rete mirabilis, a network of blood vessels effecting gas exchange between the bladder and the blood.

In some fish, a rete mirabile fills the swim bladder with oxygen. A countercurrent exchange system is utilized between the venous and arterial capillaries. By lowering the pH levels in the venous capillaries, oxygen unbinds from blood hemoglobin. This causes an increase in venous blood oxygen concentration, allowing the oxygen to diffuse through the capillary membrane and into the arterial capillaries, where oxygen is still sequestered to hemoglobin. The cycle of diffusion continues until the concentration of oxygen in the arterial capillaries is supersaturated (larger than the concentration of oxygen in the swim bladder). At this point, the free oxygen in the arterial capillaries diffuses into the swim bladder via the gas gland.

Unlike bony fish, sharks do not have gas-filled swim bladders for buoyancy. Instead, sharks rely on a large liver filled with oil that contains squalene, and their cartilage, which is about half the normal density of bone. Their liver constitutes up to 30% of their total body mass. The liver's effectiveness is limited, so sharks employ dynamic lift to maintain depth when not swimming. Sand tiger sharks store air in their stomachs, using it as a form of swim bladder. Most sharks need to constantly swim in order to breathe and cannot sleep very long without sinking (if at all). However, certain species, like the nurse shark, are capable of pumping water across their gills, allowing them to rest on the ocean bottom.

== Sensory systems ==
Most fish possess highly developed sense organs. Nearly all daylight fish have color vision that is at least as good as a human's (see vision in fishes). Many fish also have chemoreceptors that are responsible for extraordinary senses of taste and smell. Although they have ears, many fish may not hear very well. Most fish have sensitive receptors that form the lateral line system, which detects gentle currents and vibrations, and senses the motion of nearby fish and prey. Sharks can sense frequencies in the range of 25 to 50 Hz through their lateral line.

Fish orient themselves using landmarks and may use mental maps based on multiple landmarks or symbols. Fish behavior in mazes reveals that they possess spatial memory and visual discrimination.

=== Vision ===
Vision is an important sensory system for most species of fish. Fish eyes are similar to those of terrestrial vertebrates like birds and mammals, but have a more spherical lens. Their retinas generally have both rod cells and cone cells (for scotopic and photopic vision), and most species have colour vision. Some fish can see ultraviolet and some can see polarized light. Amongst jawless fish, the lamprey has well-developed eyes, while the hagfish has only primitive eyespots. Fish vision shows adaptation to their visual environment, for example deep sea fishes have eyes suited to the dark environment.

=== Hearing ===
Hearing is an important sensory system for most species of fish. Hearing threshold and the ability to localize sound sources are reduced underwater, in which the speed of sound is faster than in air. Underwater hearing is by bone conduction, and localization of sound appears to depend on differences in amplitude detected by bone conduction. Aquatic animals such as fish, however, have a more specialized hearing apparatus that is effective underwater.

Fish can sense sound through their lateral lines and their otoliths (ears). Some fishes, such as some species of carp and herring, hear through their swim bladders, which function rather like a hearing aid.

Hearing is well-developed in carp, which have the Weberian organ, three specialized vertebral processes that transfer vibrations in the swim bladder to the inner ear.

Although it is hard to test sharks' hearing, they may have a sharp sense of hearing and can possibly hear prey many miles away. A small opening on each side of their heads (not the spiracle) leads directly into the inner ear through a thin channel. The lateral line shows a similar arrangement, and is open to the environment via a series of openings called lateral line pores. This is a reminder of the common origin of these two vibration- and sound-detecting organs that are grouped together as the acoustico-lateralis system. In bony fish and tetrapods the external opening into the inner ear has been lost.

=== Chemoreception ===
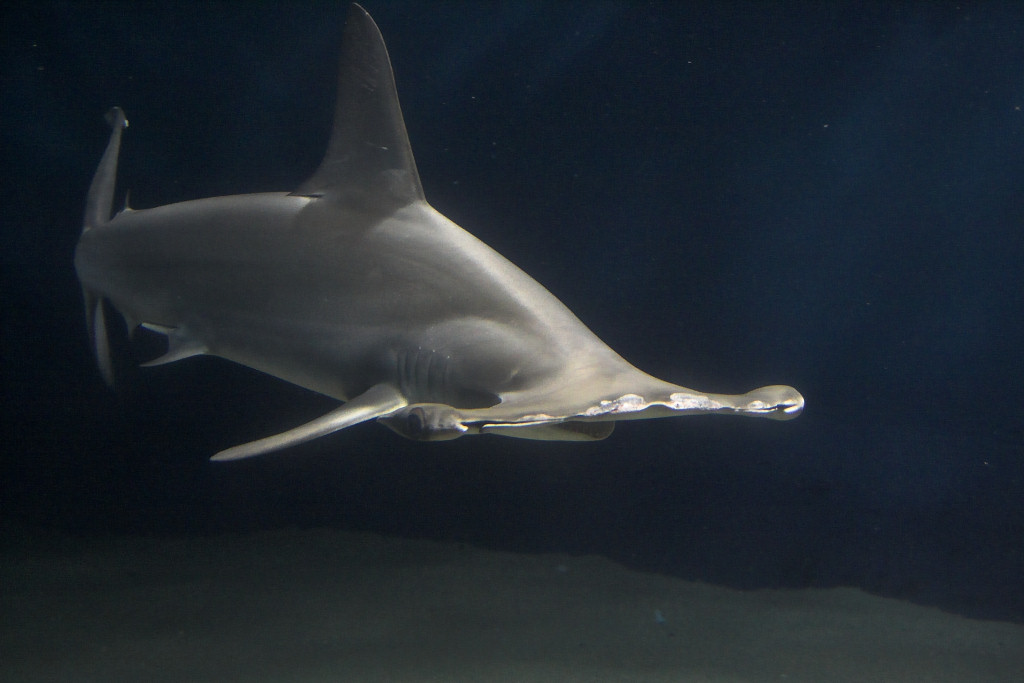
The shape of the hammerhead shark's head may enhance olfaction by spacing the nostrils further apart.

Sharks have keen olfactory senses, located in the short duct (which is not fused, unlike bony fish) between the anterior and posterior nasal openings, with some species able to detect as little as one part per million of blood in seawater.

Sharks have the ability to determine the direction of a given scent based on the timing of scent detection in each nostril. This is similar to the method mammals use to determine the direction of sound.

They are more attracted to the chemicals found in the intestines of many species, and as a result often linger near or in sewage outfalls. Some species, such as nurse sharks, have external barbels that greatly increase their ability to sense prey.

=== Electroreception ===
Electromagnetic field receptors (ampullae of Lorenzini) and motion detecting canals in the head of a shark

Some fish, such as catfish and sharks, have organs that detect weak electric currents on the order of millivolt. Other fish, like the South American electric fishes Gymnotiformes, can produce weak electric currents, which they use in navigation and social communication. In sharks, the ampullae of Lorenzini are electroreceptor organs. They number in the hundreds to thousands. Sharks use the ampullae of Lorenzini to detect the electromagnetic fields that all living things produce. This helps sharks (particularly the hammerhead shark) find prey. The shark has the greatest electrical sensitivity of any animal. Sharks find prey hidden in sand by detecting the electric fields they produce. Ocean currents moving in the magnetic field of the Earth also generate electric fields that sharks can use for orientation and possibly navigation.

- The ampullae of Lorenzini allow sharks to sense electrical discharges.
- Electric fish are able to produce electric fields by modified muscles in their body.

=== Pain ===
Experiments done by William Tavolga provide evidence that fish have pain and fear responses. For instance, in Tavolga's experiments, toadfish grunted when electrically shocked and over time they came to grunt at the mere sight of an electrode.

In 2003, Scottish scientists at the University of Edinburgh and the Roslin Institute concluded that rainbow trout exhibit behaviors often associated with pain in other animals. Bee venom and acetic acid injected into the lips resulted in fish rocking their bodies and rubbing their lips along the sides and floors of their tanks, which the researchers concluded were attempts to relieve pain, similar to what mammals would do. Neurons fired in a pattern resembling human neuronal patterns.

Professor James D. Rose of the University of Wyoming claimed the study was flawed since it did not provide proof that fish possess "conscious awareness, particularly a kind of awareness that is meaningfully like ours". Rose argues that since fish brains are so different from human brains, fish are probably not conscious in the manner humans are, so that reactions similar to human reactions to pain instead have other causes. Rose had published a study a year earlier arguing that fish cannot feel pain because their brains lack a neocortex. However, animal behaviorist Temple Grandin argues that fish could still have consciousness without a neocortex because "different species can use different brain structures and systems to handle the same functions."

Animal welfare advocates raise concerns about the possible suffering of fish caused by angling. Some countries, such as Germany have banned specific types of fishing, and the British RSPCA now formally prosecutes individuals who are cruel to fish.

== Reproductive processes ==
Oogonia development in teleost fish varies according to the group, and the determination of oogenesis dynamics allows the understanding of maturation and fertilisation processes. Changes in the nucleus, ooplasm, and the surrounding layers characterize the oocyte maturation process.

Postovulatory follicles are structures formed after oocyte release; they do not have endocrine function, present a wide irregular lumen, and are rapidly reabsorbed in a process involving the apoptosis of follicular cells. A degenerative process called follicular atresia reabsorbs vitellogenic oocytes not spawned. This process can also occur, but less frequently, in oocytes in other development stages.

Some fish are hermaphrodites, having both testes and ovaries either at different phases in their life cycle or, as in hamlets, have them simultaneously.

Over 97% of all known fish are oviparous, that is, the eggs develop outside the mother's body. Examples of oviparous fish include salmon, goldfish, cichlids, tuna, and eels. In the majority of these species, fertilisation takes place outside the mother's body, with the male and female fish shedding their gametes into the surrounding water. However, a few oviparous fish practice internal fertilisation, with the male using some sort of intromittent organ to deliver sperm into the genital opening of the female, most notably the oviparous sharks, such as the horn shark, and oviparous rays, such as skates. In these cases, the male is equipped with a pair of modified pelvic fins known as claspers.

Marine fish can produce high numbers of eggs which are often released into the open water column. The eggs have an average diameter of 1 millimetre (0.039 in). The eggs are generally surrounded by the extraembryonic membranes but do not develop a shell, hard or soft, around these membranes. Some fish have thick, leathery coats, especially if they must withstand physical force or desiccation. These types of eggs can also be very small and fragile.

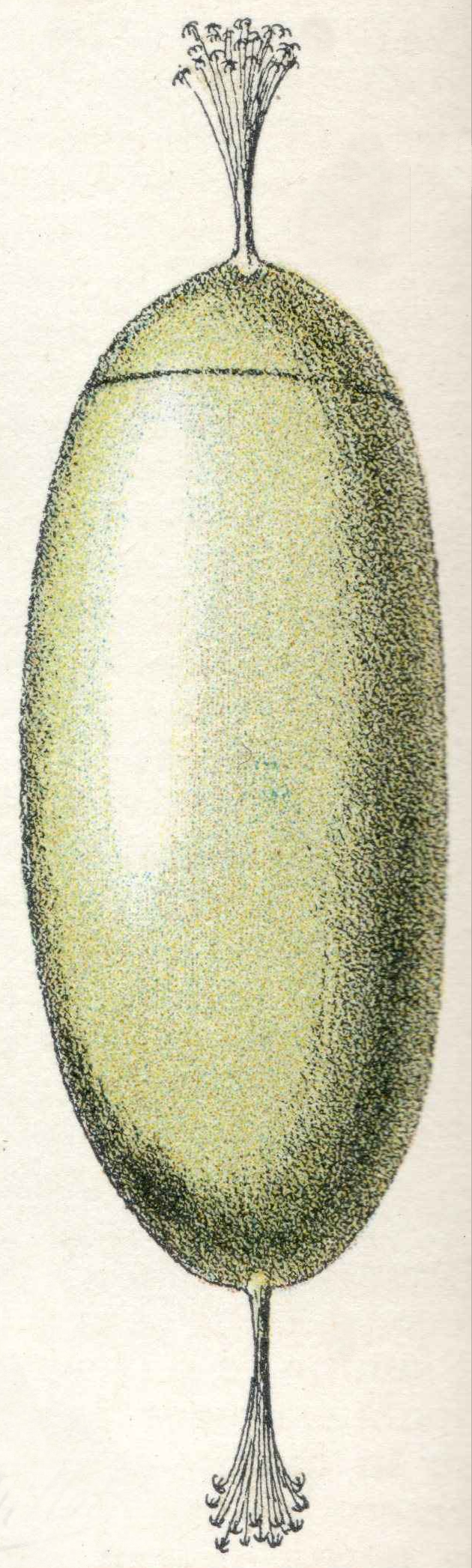
Egg of lamprey

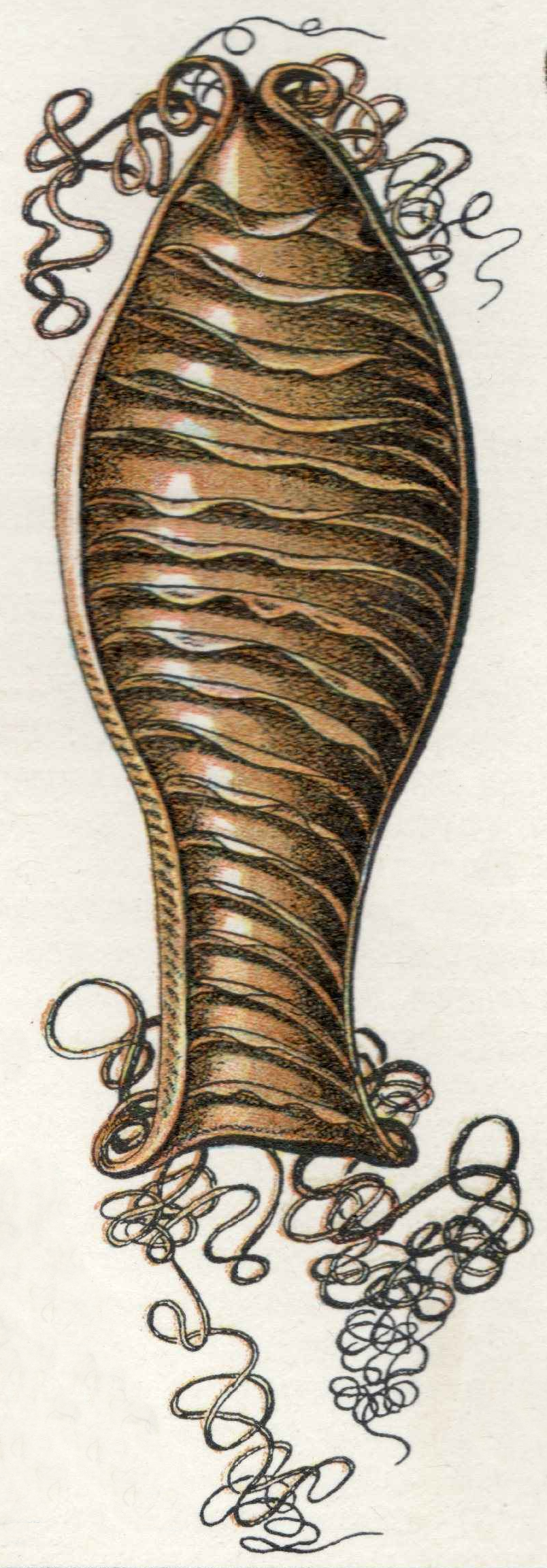
Egg of catshark (mermaids' purse)

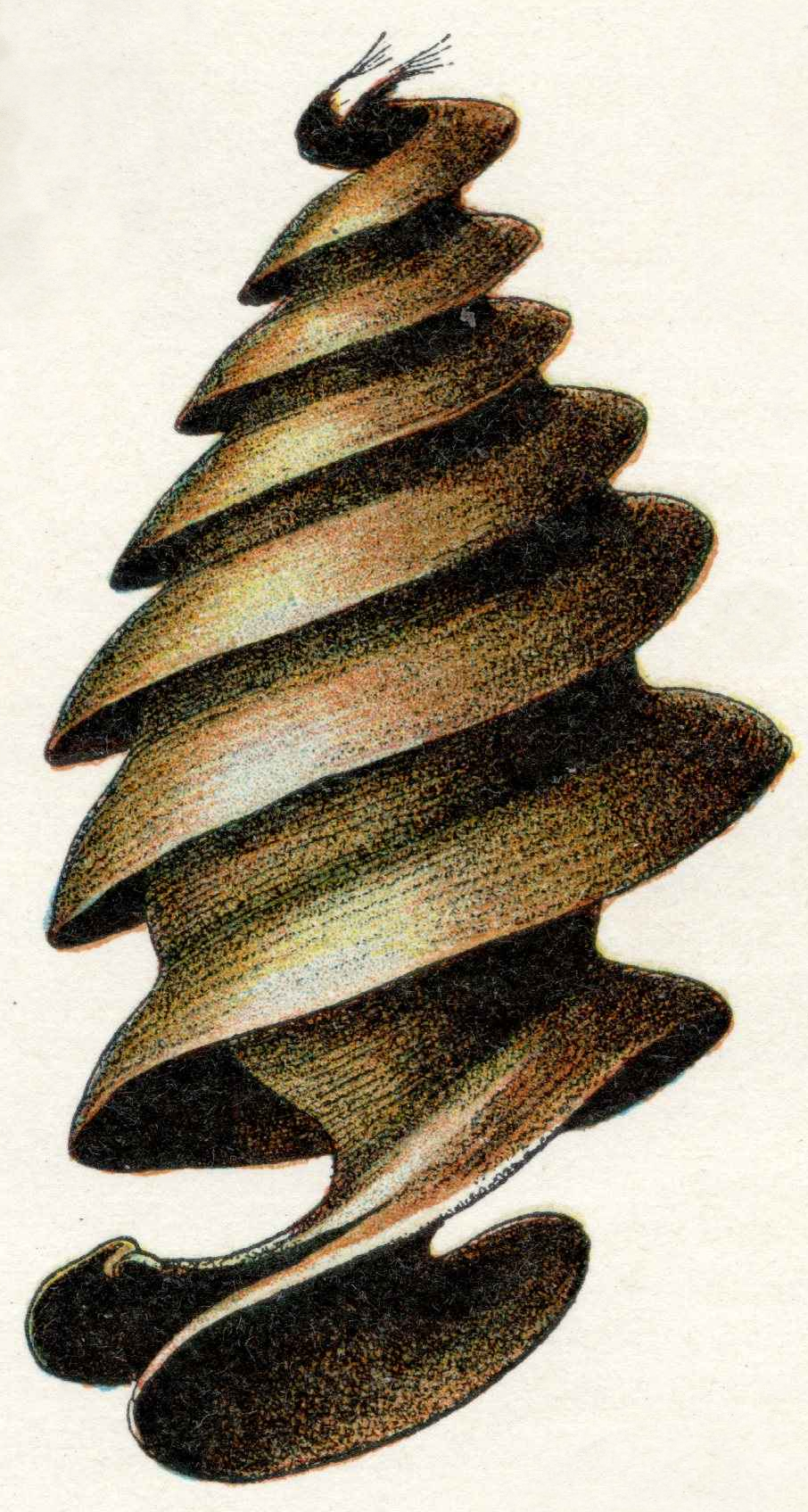
Egg of bullhead shark

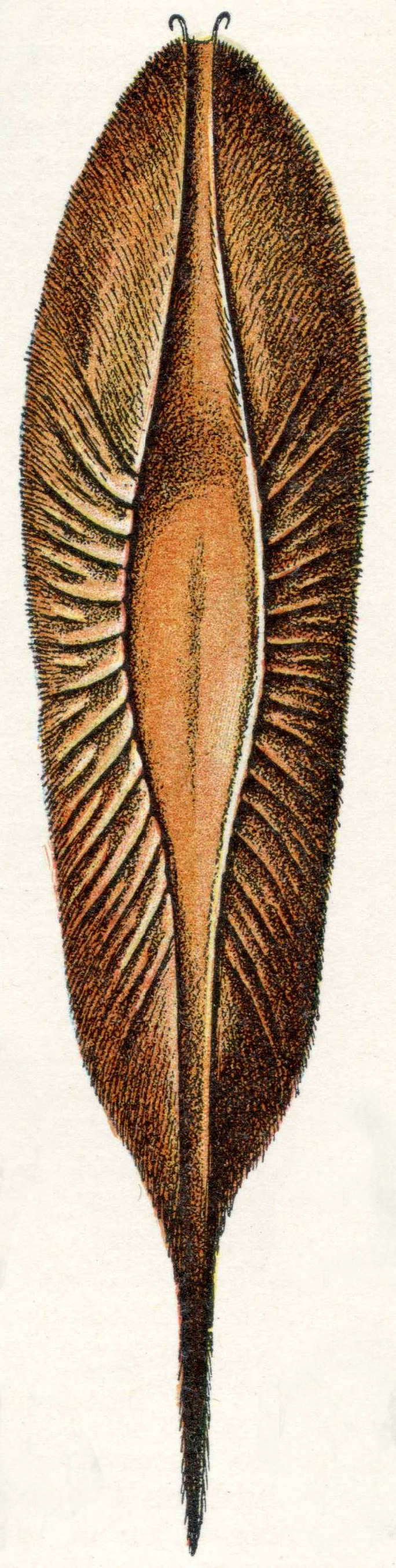
Egg of chimaera

The newly hatched young of oviparous fish are called larvae. They are usually poorly formed, carry a large yolk sac (for nourishment) and are very different in appearance from juvenile and adult specimens. The larval period in oviparous fish is relatively short (usually only several weeks), and larvae rapidly grow and change appearance and structure (a process termed metamorphosis) to become juveniles. During this transition larvae must switch from their yolk sac to feeding on zooplankton prey, a process which depends on typically inadequate zooplankton density, starving many larvae.

In ovoviviparous fish the eggs develop inside the mother's body after internal fertilisation but receive little or no nourishment directly from the mother, depending instead on the yolk. Each embryo develops in its own egg. Familiar examples of ovoviviparous fish include guppies, angel sharks, and coelacanths.

Some species of fish are viviparous. In such species the mother retains the eggs and nourishes the embryos. Typically, viviparous fish have a structure analogous to the placenta seen in mammals connecting the mother's blood supply with that of the embryo. Examples of viviparous fish include the surf-perches, splitfins, and lemon shark. Some viviparous fish exhibit oophagy, in which the developing embryos eat other eggs produced by the mother. This has been observed primarily among sharks, such as the shortfin mako and porbeagle, but is known for a few bony fish as well, such as the halfbeak Nomorhamphus ebrardtii. Intrauterine cannibalism is an even more unusual mode of vivipary, in which the largest embryos eat weaker and smaller siblings. This behavior is also most commonly found among sharks, such as the grey nurse shark, but has also been reported for Nomorhamphus ebrardtii.

In many species of fish, fins have been modified to allow Internal fertilisation.

Aquarists commonly refer to ovoviviparous and viviparous fish as livebearers.

- Many fish species are hermaphrodites. Synchronous hermaphrodites possess both ovaries and testes at the same time. Sequential hermaphrodites have both types of tissue in their gonads, with one type being predominant while the fish belongs to the corresponding gender.

== Social behaviour ==
Fish social behaviour called 'shoaling' involves a group of fish swimming together. This behaviour is a defence mechanism in the sense that there is safety in large numbers, where chances of being eaten by predators are reduced. Shoaling also increases mating and foraging success. Schooling on the other hand, is a behaviour within the shoal where fish can be seen performing various manoeuvres in a synchronised manner. The parallel swimming is a form of 'social copying' where fish in the school replicate the direction and velocity of its neighbouring fishes.

Experiments done by D.M. Steven, on the shoaling behaviour of fish concluded that during the day, fish had a higher tendency to stay together as a result of a balance between single fish leaving and finding their own direction and the mutual attraction between fishes of the same species. It was found that at night the fish swam noticeably faster however, often singly and in no co-ordination. Groups of two or three could be seen frequently formed although were dispersed after a couple of seconds.

Theoretically, the amount of time that a fish stays together in a shoal should represent their cost of staying instead of leaving. A past laboratory experiment done on cyprinids has established that the time budget for social behaviour within a shoal varies proportionally to the quantity of fishes present. This originates from the cost/benefit ratio which changes accordingly with group size, measured by the risk of predation versus food intake. When the cost/benefit ratio is favourable to shoaling behaviour then decisions to stay with a group or join one is favourable. Depending on this ratio, fish will correspondingly decide to leave or stay. Thus, shoaling behaviour is considered to be driven by an individual fish's constant stream of decisions.

== See also ==
- Anatomical terms of location
- Digital Fish Library
- Evolution of fish
- Fish anatomy
- Fish development
- Fish measurement
- Ichthyology terms
- Panderichthys digits
