= Swim bladder disease =

Disease of fish

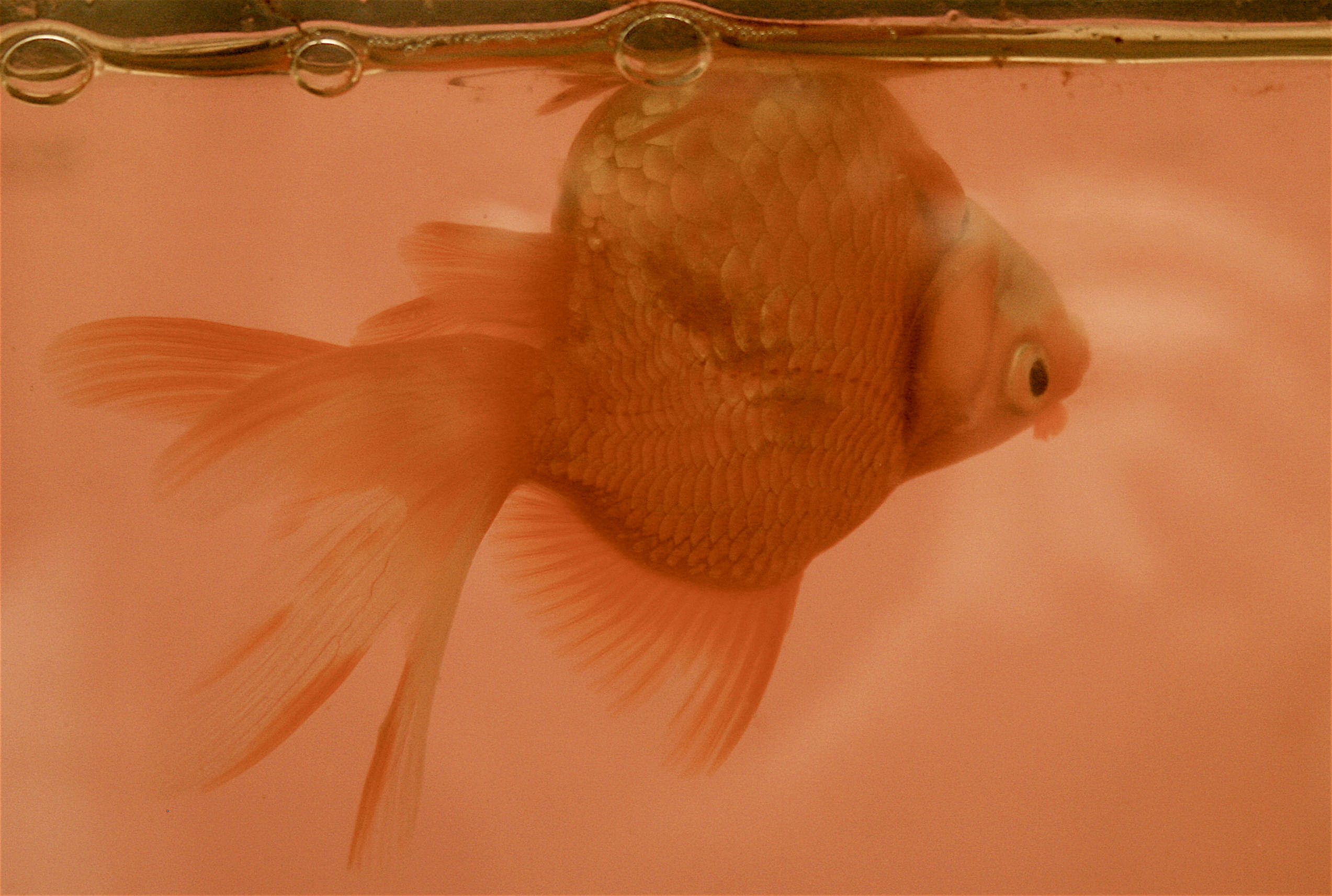
Female ryukin goldfish with swim bladder disease

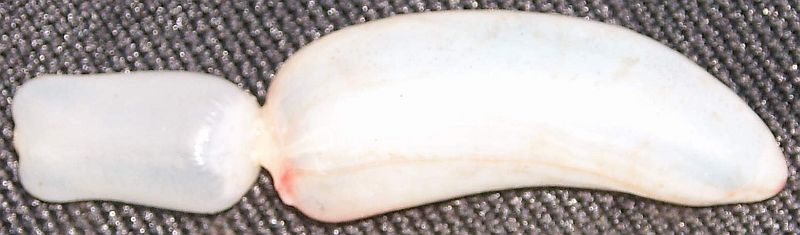
The gas bladder of a fish

Swim bladder disease, also called swim bladder disorder or flipover, is a common ailment in aquarium fish. The swim bladder is an internal gas-filled organ that contributes to the ability of a fish to control its buoyancy, and thus to stay at the current water depth without having to waste energy in swimming. A fish with swim bladder disorder can float nose down tail up, or can float to the top or sink to the bottom of the aquarium.

Swim bladder disease is a very common illness within aquarium fish that results in the bladder not functioning properly causing the fish to swim upside down. This disorder can be due to multiple factors such as physical abnormalities, environmental, mechanical, or in some cases due to fishes being inbred. This disorder is commonly known to be seen in goldfish and bettas. With this element being impaired, it will affect the way that they travel and balance themselves throughout the water which is important to how they keep afloat. In worse cases, this disease can result in fish death.

== Background ==
A swim bladder is an organ that goes by the name air bladder or gas bladder. This organ is created during the embryonic stage from the out-pocketing canal. Within the fish air bladder is two different halves. The front half (dorsal) side covered in a thick tissue, which does not allow for much movement or fluctuation. The bladder is tightly linked to the spine, which prevents it from shifting position. The other half (the ventral side) of the swim bladder is located closer to the tail. When there is air in the bladder the ventral side can vary substantially in size depending on how much gas is present. The chamber of the swim bladder is only linked to the dorsal chamber by a tiny duct, and its position can shift according to a variety of factors.

== Causes ==
Fancy goldfish are among the fish most commonly affected by this disorder. The disease may be caused by intestinal parasites or by constipation induced by high nitrate levels from over feeding.

As we look deeper into what is happening throughout the body, tissue and organs are being heavily affected. This can be due to overeating, overconsumption, low water temperatures, bacterial infections, parasites, or other impaired organs affecting the bladder. In these particular cases, the fish can end up with a distended belly, curved back, impaired swimming, or even death leaving them floating on top of the water. Typically a fish owner would be able to identify whether or not their fish is suffering from this disease. A change in swim pattern, and change in physical shape and appearance, are the most common signs that a fish is struggling with this disease.

== Remedies ==
A remedy, which can work within hours, perhaps by countering constipation, is to feed green peas to affected fish. Fish surgeons can also adjust the buoyancy of the fish by placing a stone in the swim bladder or performing a partial removal of the bladder.

In order to prevent this disease, keep the tank as clean as possible, make sure the temperature is slightly higher than normal to aid in digestion, and, most importantly, feed the fish highly nutritious foods. Maintaining these three factors will give the fish the best chance of not catching this disease.

The disease is not contagious, and will not be transmitted to other fish within the same tank. It will be best to separate the fish from others so it can better be treated and have its symptoms observed. By giving them their own separate space will also aid in recovery. It is suggested to keep all pebbles, stones, habitat, floras and other fish accessories out of the tank to give the fish the best chance of survival.
