= Physostome =

Type of fish

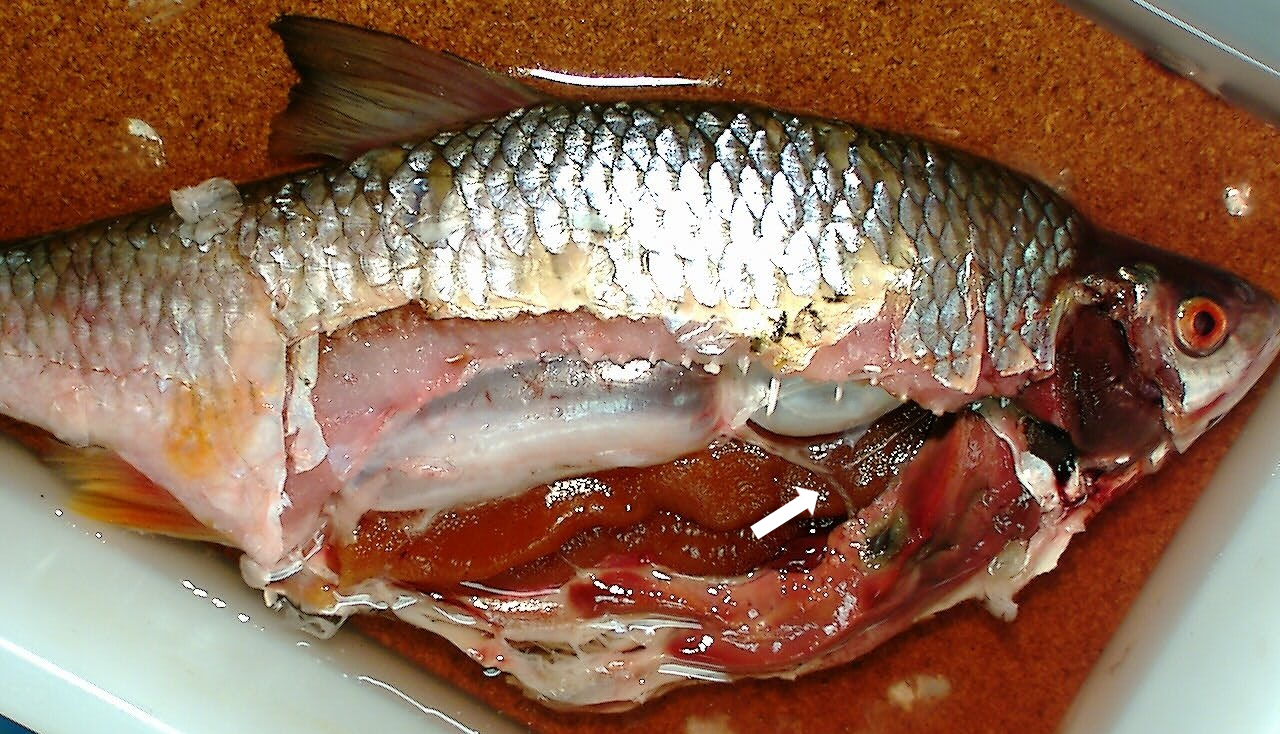
The ductus pneumaticus from the gas bladder to the gut in a common rudd.

Physostomes are fishes that have a pneumatic duct connecting the gas bladder to the alimentary canal. This allows the gas bladder to be filled or emptied via the mouth. This not only allows the fish to fill their bladder by gulping air, but also to rapidly ascend in the water without the bladder expanding to bursting point. In contrast, fish without any connection to their gas bladder are called physoclisti.

The physostome fish encompass the bichirs, gars, a number of carps, trouts, herrings, catfish, eels and the lungfish. While the gas bladder in fish mainly serves as a buoyancy organ, some physostomes (though not all) can use their gas bladder as a lung, allowing them to live from atmospheric oxygen in conditions where aquatic oxygen levels have dropped to a point which would kill other fish.
