= Swim bladder =

Gas-filled organ in bony fish

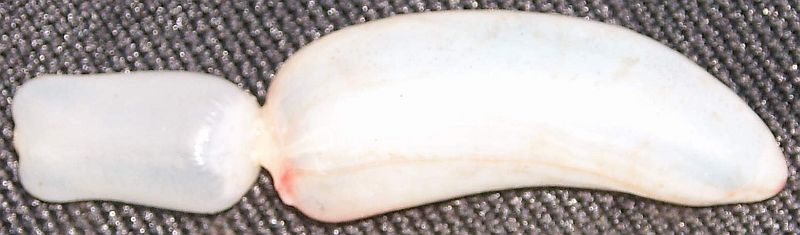
The swim bladder of a rudd

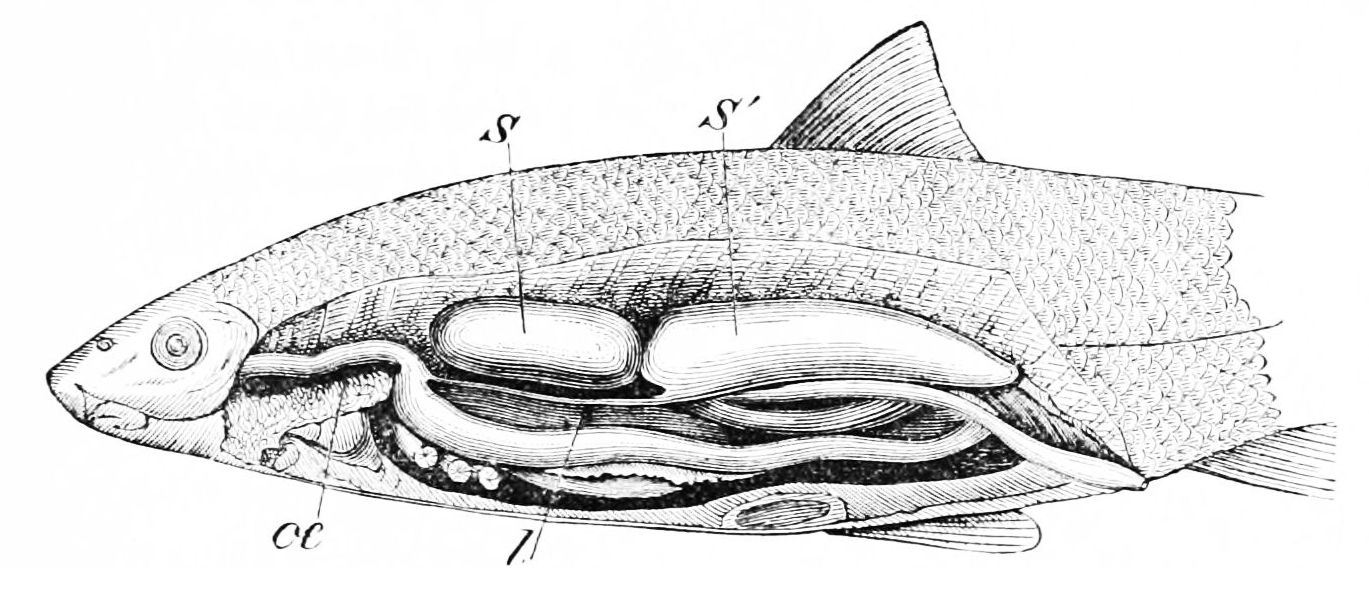
Internal positioning of the swim bladder of a bleak S: anterior, S': posterior portion of the air bladder œ: œsophagus; l: air passage of the air bladder

The swim bladder, gas bladder, fish maw, air bladder or sound is an internal gas-filled organ in bony fish that functions to modulate buoyancy, and thus allowing the fish to stay at desired water depth without having to maintain lift via swimming, which expends more energy. The ventral position of the swim bladder means that the center of mass is above the center of buoyancy, reducing stability but improving maneuverability. Additionally, the swim bladder functions as a resonating chamber to produce or receive sound.

The swim bladder is evolutionarily homologous to the lungs of tetrapods and lungfish, and some ray-finned fish such as bowfins have also evolved similar respiratory functions in their swim bladders. Charles Darwin remarked upon this in On the Origin of Species, and reasoned that the lung in air-breathing vertebrates had derived from a more primitive swim bladder as a specialized form of enteral respiration.

Some species, such as mostly bottom dwellers like the weather fish and redlip blenny, have secondarily lost the swim bladder during the embryonic stage. Other fish, like the opah and the pomfret, use their pectoral fins to swim and balance the weight of the head to keep a horizontal position. The normally bottom-dwelling sea robin can use their pectoral fins to produce lift while swimming like cartilaginous fish do.

The gas/tissue interface at the swim bladder produces a strong reflection of sound, which is used by sonar equipment to find fish.

Cartilaginous fish such as sharks and rays do not have swim bladders, as they belong to a completely different evolutionary clade. Without swim bladders to modulate buoyancy, most cartilaginous fish can only control depth by actively swimming, which produces dynamic lift; others store up lipids with specific density less than that of seawater to produce a neutral or near-neutral buoyancy, which cannot be readily changed with depth.

== Structure and function ==
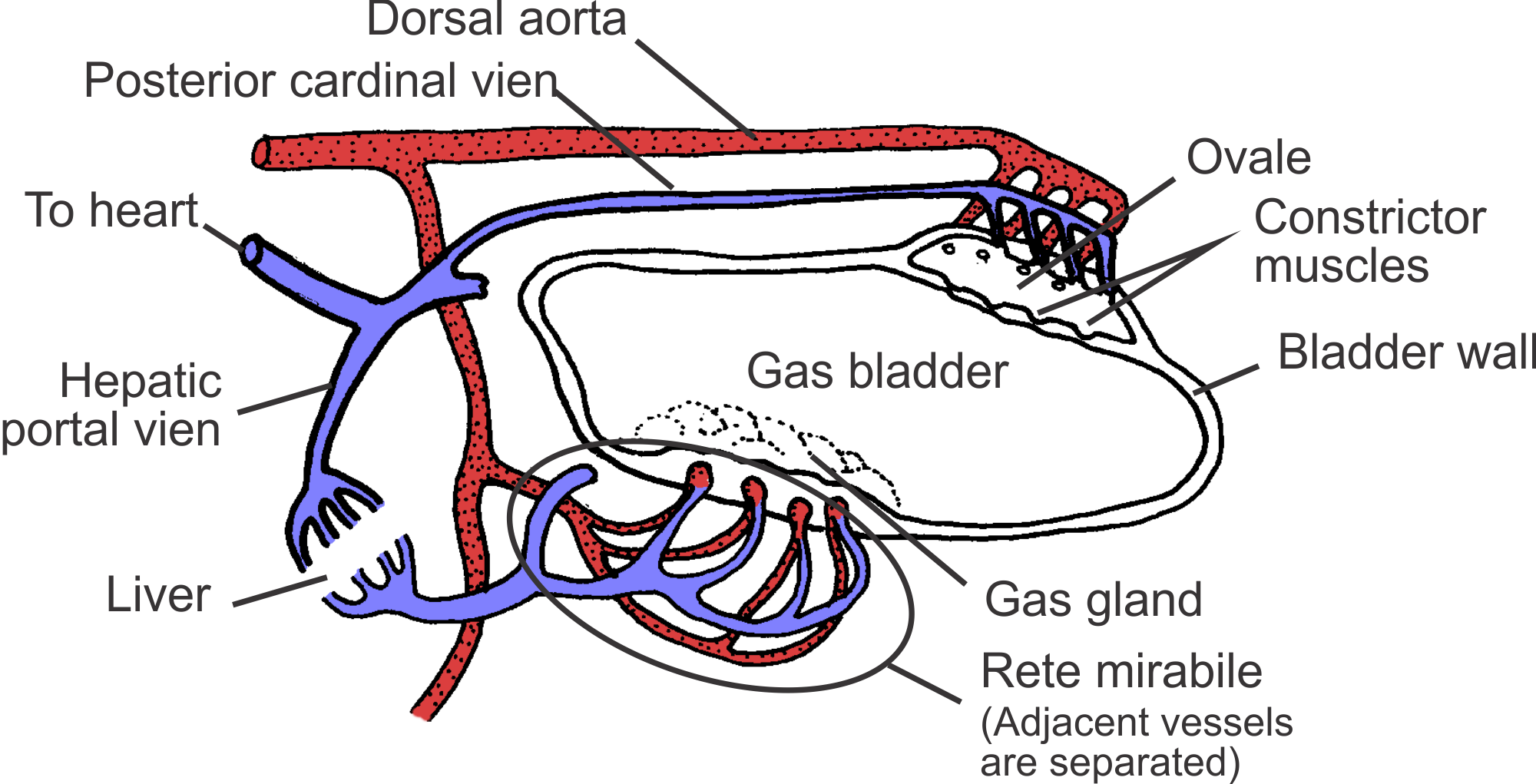
Swim bladder from a bony (teleost) fish

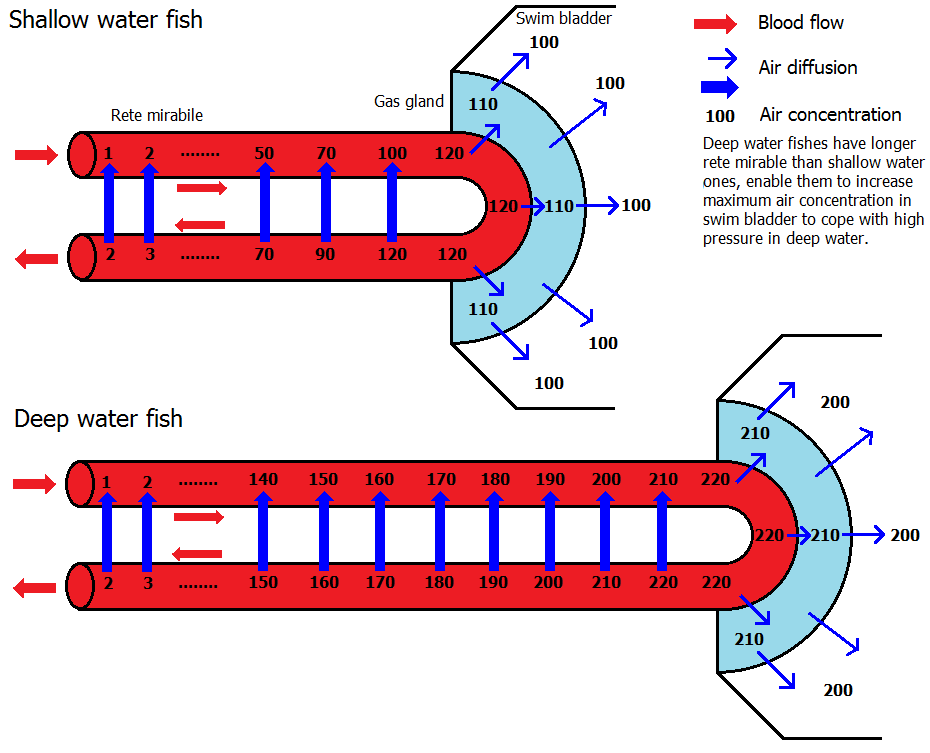
How gas is pumped into the swim bladder using counter-current exchange

The swim bladder normally consists of two gas-filled sacs located in the dorsal portion of the fish, although in a few primitive species, there is only a single sac. It has flexible walls that contract or expand according to the ambient pressure. The walls of the bladder contain very few blood vessels and are lined with guanine crystals, which make them impermeable to gases. By adjusting the gas pressurising organ using the gas gland or oval window, the fish can obtain neutral buoyancy and ascend and descend to a large range of depths. Due to the dorsal position it gives the fish lateral stability.

In physostomous swim bladders, a connection is retained between the swim bladder and the gut, the pneumatic duct, allowing the fish to fill up the swim bladder by "gulping" air. Excess gas can be removed in a similar manner.

In more derived varieties of fish (the physoclisti), the connection to the digestive tract is lost. In early life stages, these fish must rise to the surface to fill up their swim bladders; in later stages, the pneumatic duct disappears, and the gas gland has to introduce gas (usually oxygen) to the bladder to increase its volume and thus increase buoyancy. This process begins with the acidification of the blood in the rete mirabile when the gas gland excretes lactic acid and produces carbon dioxide, the latter of which acidifies the blood via the bicarbonate buffer system. The resulting acidity causes the hemoglobin of the blood to lose its oxygen (Root effect) which then diffuses partly into the swim bladder. Before returning to the body, the blood re-enters the rete mirabile, and as a result, virtually all the excess carbon dioxide and oxygen produced in the gas gland diffuses back to the arteries supplying the gas gland via a countercurrent multiplication loop. Thus a very high gas pressure of oxygen can be obtained, which can even account for the presence of gas in the swim bladders of deep sea fish like the eel, requiring a pressure of hundreds of bars. Elsewhere, at a similar structure known as the 'oval window', the bladder is in contact with blood and the oxygen can diffuse back out again. Together with oxygen, other gases are salted out in the swim bladder which accounts for the high pressures of other gases as well.

The combination of gases in the bladder varies. In shallow water fish, the ratios closely approximate that of the atmosphere, while deep sea fish tend to have higher percentages of oxygen. For instance, the eel Synaphobranchus has been observed to have 75.1% oxygen, 20.5% nitrogen, 3.1% carbon dioxide, and 0.4% argon in its swim bladder.

Physoclist swim bladders have one important disadvantage: they prohibit fast rising, as the bladder would burst. Physostomes can "burp" out gas, though this complicates the process of re-submergence.

The swim bladder in some species, mainly fresh water fishes (common carp, catfish, bowfin) is interconnected with the inner ear of the fish. They are connected by four bones called the Weberian ossicles from the Weberian apparatus. These bones can carry the vibrations to the saccule and the lagena. They are suited for detecting sound and vibrations due to its low density in comparison to the density of the fish's body tissues. This increases the ability of sound detection. The swim bladder can radiate the pressure of sound which help increase its sensitivity and expand its hearing. In some deep sea fishes like the Antimora, the swim bladder may also be connected to the macula of saccule in order for the inner ear to receive a sensation from the sound pressure. In red-bellied piranha, the swim bladder may play an important role in sound production as a resonator. The sounds created by piranhas are generated through rapid contractions of the sonic muscles and is associated with the swim bladder.

Teleosts are thought to lack a sense of absolute hydrostatic pressure, which could be used to determine absolute depth. However, it has been suggested that teleosts may be able to determine their depth by sensing the rate of change of swim-bladder volume.

== Evolution ==
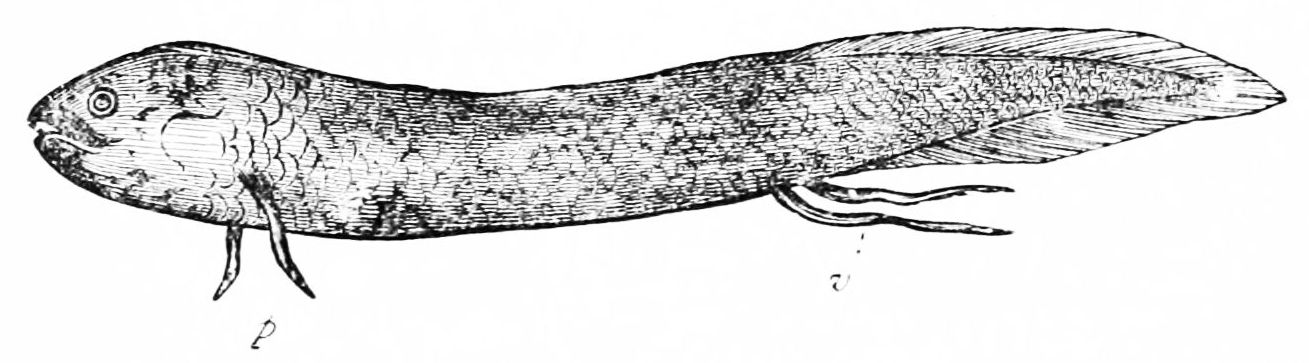
The West African lungfish possesses a lung homologous to swim bladders.

The illustration of the swim bladder in fishes ... shows us clearly the highly important fact that an organ originally constructed for one purpose, namely, flotation, may be converted into one for a widely different purpose, namely, respiration. The swim bladder has, also, been worked in as an accessory to the auditory organs of certain fishes. All physiologists admit that the swimbladder is homologous, or "ideally similar" in position and structure with the lungs of the higher vertebrate animals: hence there is no reason to doubt that the swim bladder has actually been converted into lungs, or an organ used exclusively for respiration. According to this view it may be inferred that all vertebrate animals with true lungs are descended by ordinary generation from an ancient and unknown prototype, which was furnished with a floating apparatus or swim bladder.

— Charles Darwin, 1859

Swim bladders are evolutionarily closely related (i.e., homologous) to lungs. The first lungs originated in the last common ancestor of the Actinopterygii (ray-finned fish) and Sarcopterygii (lobe-finned fish and the tetrapods) as expansions of the upper digestive tract which allowed them to gulp air under oxygen-poor conditions. In the Actinopteri (ray-finned fish minus the bichirs) the lungs evolved into a swim bladder (secondary absent in some lineages), which—unlike lungs, which bud ventrally—buds dorsally from the anterior foregut. Coelacanths have a "fatty organ" that has sometimes been referred to as a swim bladder, but it is structurally different and has a separate evolutionary history.

In 1997, Farmer proposed that lungs evolved to supply the heart with oxygen. In fish, blood circulates from the gills to the skeletal muscle, and only then to the heart. During intense exercise, the oxygen in the blood gets used by the skeletal muscle before the blood reaches the heart. Primitive lungs gave an advantage by supplying the heart with oxygenated blood via the cardiac shunt. This theory is robustly supported by the fossil record, the ecology of extant air-breathing fishes, and the physiology of extant fishes. In embryonal development, both lung and swim bladder originate as an outpocketing from the gut; in the case of swim bladders, this connection to the gut continues to exist as the pneumatic duct in the more "primitive" ray-finned fish, and is lost in some of the more derived teleost orders. There are no animals which have both lungs and a swim bladder.

As an adaptation to migration between the surface and deeper waters, some fish have evolved a swim bladder where the gas is replaced with low-density wax esters as a way to cope with Boyle's law.

The cartilaginous fish (e.g., sharks and rays) split from the other fishes about 420 million years ago and lack both lungs and swim bladders, suggesting that these structures evolved after that split. Correspondingly, these fish also have both heterocercal tails and stiff, wing-like pectoral fins which provide the necessary lift needed due to the lack of a swim bladder. Teleost fish with swim bladders have neutral buoyancy and thus have no need for this lift.

== Sonar reflectivity ==
The swim bladder of a fish can strongly reflect sound of an appropriate frequency. Strong reflection happens if the frequency is tuned to the volume resonance of the swim bladder. This can be calculated by knowing a number of properties of the fish, notably the volume of the swim bladder, although the well-accepted method for doing so requires correction factors for gas-bearing zooplankton where the radius of the swim bladder is less than about 5 cm. This is important, since sonar scattering is used to estimate the biomass of commercially- and environmentally-important fish species.

== Deep scattering layer ==
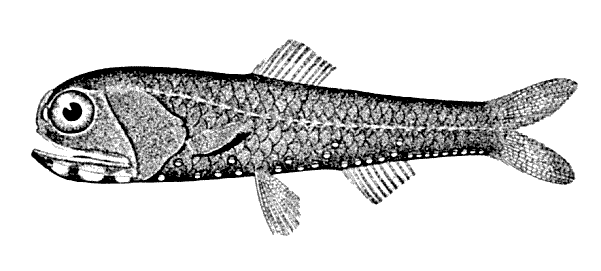
Most mesopelagic fishes are small filter feeders which ascend at night using their swimbladders to feed in the nutrient rich waters of the epipelagic zone. During the day, they return to the dark, cold, oxygen deficient waters of the mesopelagic where they are relatively safe from predators. Lanternfish account for as much as 65 percent of all deep sea fish biomass and are largely responsible for the deep scattering layer of the world's oceans.

Sonar operators, using the newly developed sonar technology during World War II, were puzzled by what appeared to be a false sea floor 300–350 metres (980–1,150 ft) deep at day, and less deep at night. This turned out to be due to millions of marine organisms, most particularly small mesopelagic fish, with swimbladders that reflected the sonar. These organisms migrate up into shallower water at dusk to feed on plankton. The layer is deeper when the moon is out, and can become shallower when clouds obscure the moon.

Most mesopelagic fish make daily vertical migrations, moving at night into the epipelagic zone, often following similar migrations of zooplankton, and returning to the depths for safety during the day. These vertical migrations often occur over large vertical distances, and are undertaken with the assistance of a swim bladder. The swim bladder is inflated when the fish wants to move up, and, given the high pressures in the mesopelagic zone, this requires significant energy. As the fish ascends, the pressure in the swimbladder must adjust to prevent it from bursting. When the fish wants to return to the depths, the swimbladder is deflated. Some mesopelagic fishes make daily migrations through the thermocline, where the temperature changes between 10 and 20 °C (50 and 68 °F), thus displaying considerable tolerance for temperature change.

Sampling via deep trawling indicates that lanternfish account for as much as 65% of all deep sea fish biomass. Indeed, lanternfish are among the most widely distributed, populous, and diverse of all vertebrates, playing an important ecological role as prey for larger organisms. The estimated global biomass of lanternfish is 550–660 million tonnes, several times the annual world fisheries catch. Lanternfish also account for much of the biomass responsible for the deep scattering layer of the world's oceans. Sonar reflects off the millions of lanternfish swim bladders, giving the appearance of a false bottom.

== Human uses ==
Historically, swim bladders were used to make condoms. They were also used as artificial hymens to satisfy cultural expectations of virginity during consummation of marriage.

=== Fish maw ===
In the East Asian culinary sphere, the swim bladders of certain large fishes are considered a food delicacy. In Chinese cuisine, they are known as fish maw (Chinese: 花膠; pinyin: huājiāo or Chinese: 鱼鳔; pinyin: yúbiào), and are served in soups or stews.

The vanity price of a vanishing kind of maw is behind the imminent extinction of the vaquita, the world's smallest porpoise species. Found only in Mexico's Gulf of California, the once numerous vaquita are now critically endangered. Vaquita die in gillnets set to catch totoaba (the world's largest drum fish). Totoaba are being hunted to extinction for its maw, which can sell for as much $10,000 per kilogram.

=== Isinglass ===
Swim bladders are also used in the food industry as a source of collagen called isinglass. Isinglass can be made into a strong, water-resistant glue, or used for the clarification of beer.

== Swim bladder disease ==
Swim bladder disease is a common ailment in aquarium fish. A fish with swim bladder disorder can float nose down tail up, or can float to the top or sink to the bottom of the aquarium.

== Risk of injury ==
Many anthropogenic activities, such as pile driving or even seismic waves, can create high-intensity sound waves that cause internal injury to fish that possess a gas bladder. Physoclisti can not expel air quickly enough from the gas bladder, the organ most susceptible to sonic damage, thus making it difficult for them to escape major injury. Physostomes, on the other hand, can release air from their gas bladder expeditiously enough to protect it; nevertheless, they can not relieve pressure in their other vital organs, and are therefore also vulnerable to injury. Some of the commonly seen injuries include ruptured gas bladder and renal haemorrhage. These mostly affect the overall health of the fish but not their mortality rate. Investigators employed the High-Intensity-Controlled Impedance-Fluid-Filled (HICI-FT), a stainless-steel wave tube with an electromagnetic shaker. It simulates high-energy sound waves in aquatic far-field, plane-wave acoustic conditions.

== Similar structures in other organisms ==
Siphonophores have a special swim bladder that allows the jellyfish-like colonies to float along the surface of the water while their tentacles trail below. This organ is unrelated to the one in fish.

== Gallery ==
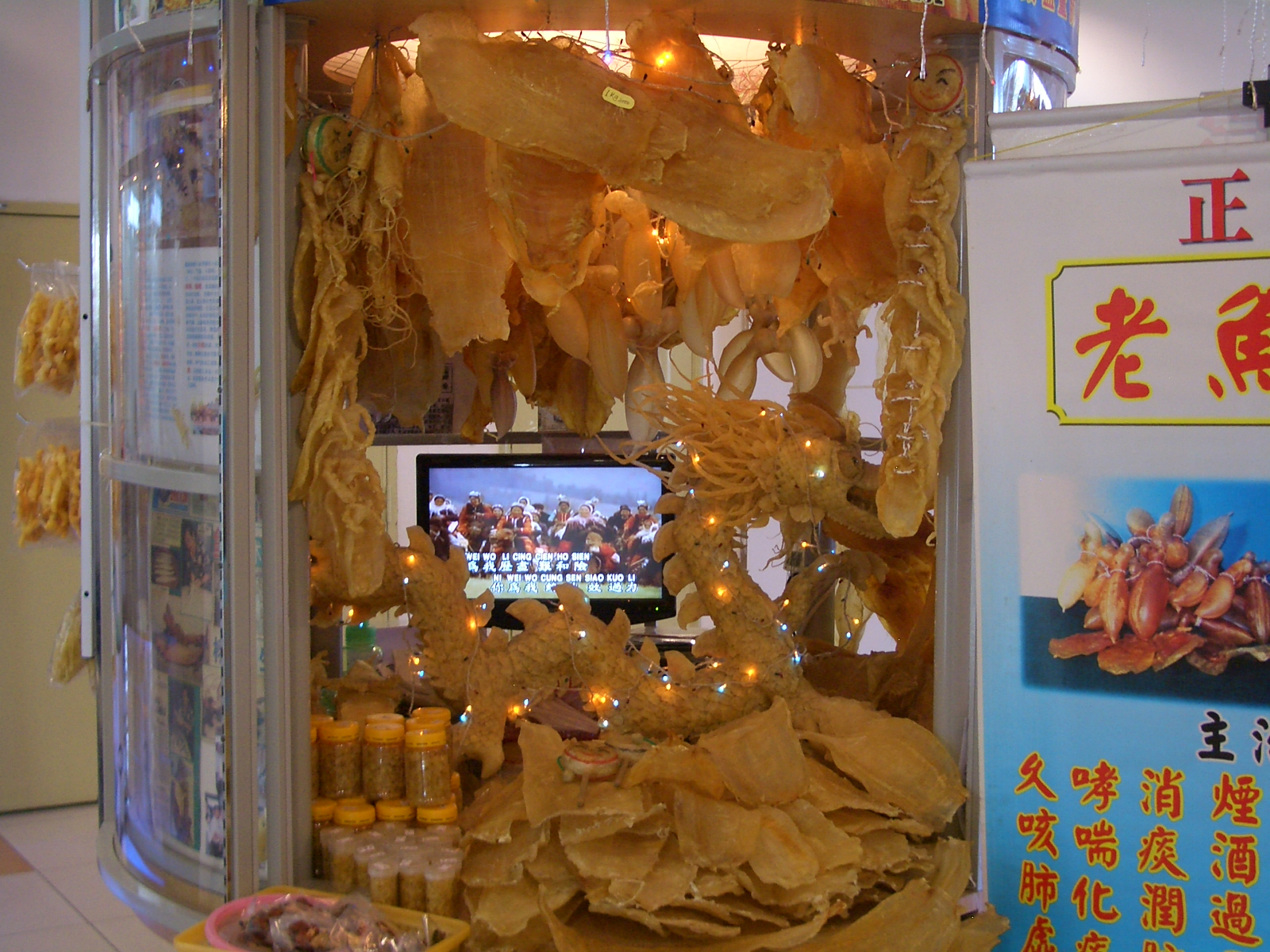
Swim bladder display in a Malacca shopping mall

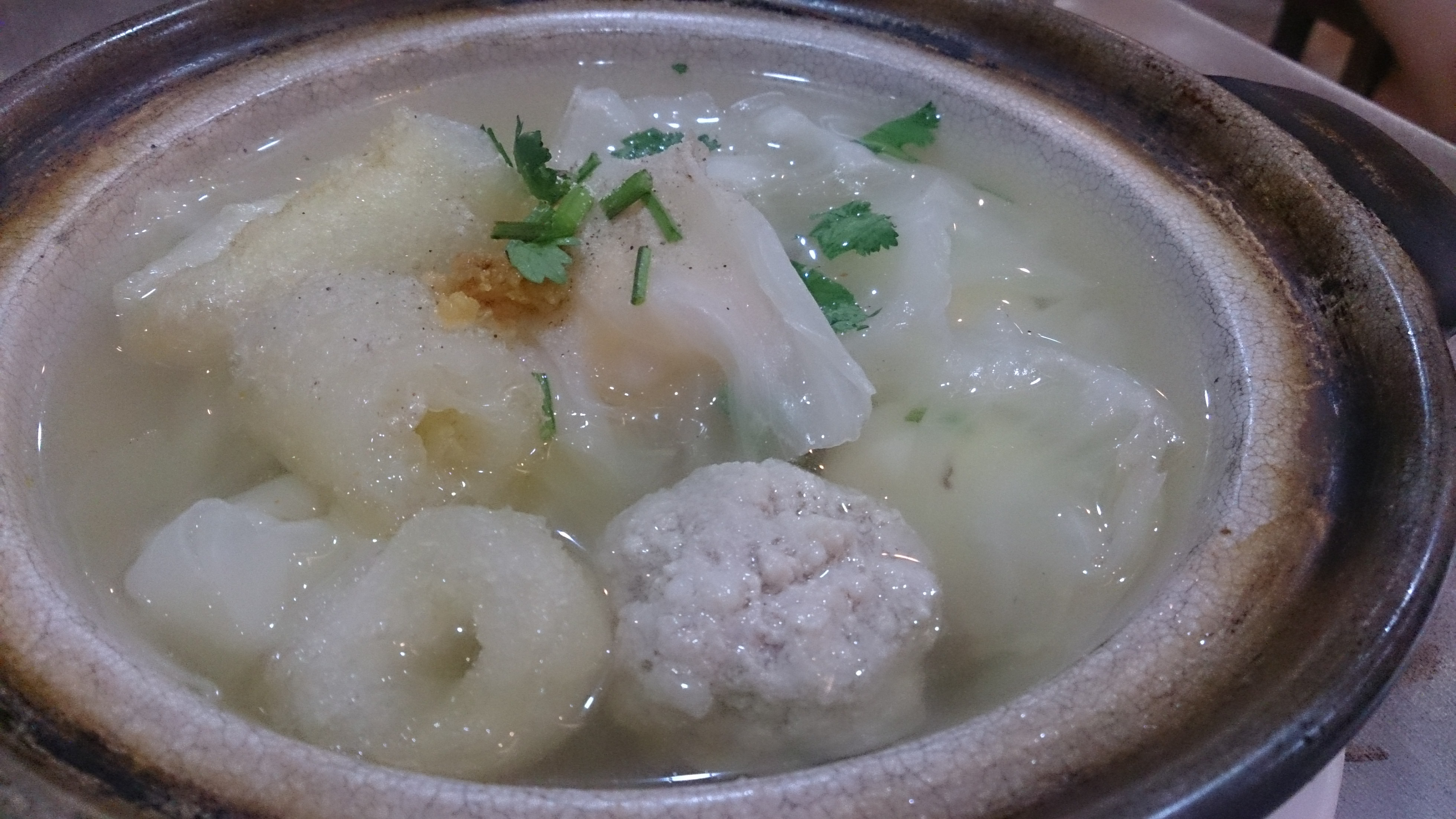
Fish maw soup

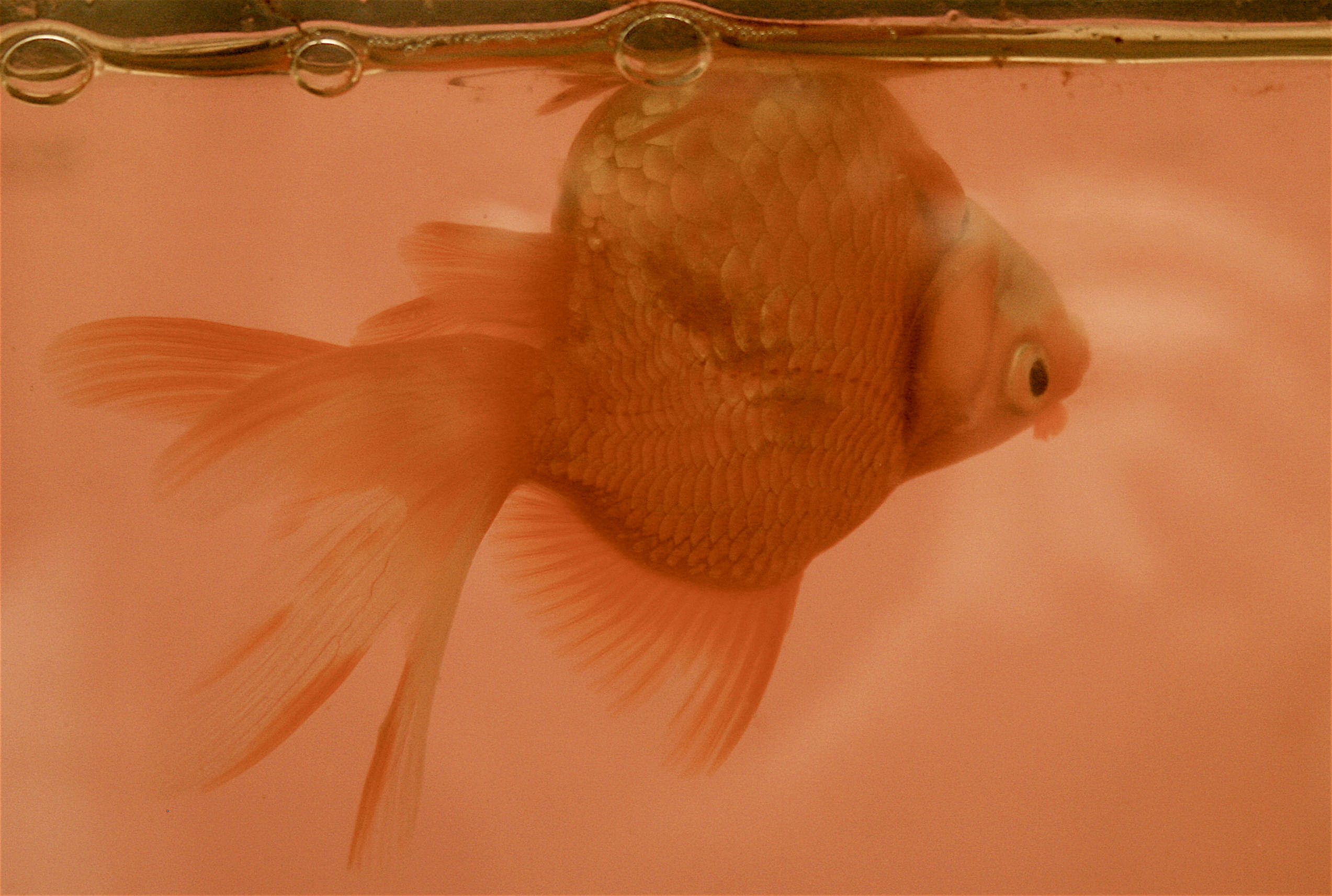
Swim bladder disease has resulted in this female Ryukin goldfish floating upside down.

1930 illustration of the structure of a gar swim bladder

== Further references ==
- Bond, Carl E. (1996) Biology of Fishes, 2nd ed., Saunders, pp. 283–290.
- Pelster, Bernd (1997) "Buoyancy at depth" In: WS Hoar, DJ Randall and AP Farrell (Eds) Deep-Sea Fishes, pages 195–237, Academic Press. ISBN 9780080585406.
