= Physoclisti =

Type of fish

Physoclisti are, collectively, fishes that lack a connection between the gas bladder and the alimentary canal, with the bladder serving only as a buoyancy organ.

Addition and removal of the gases from the gas bladder in such physoclistous fishes occurs through specialised structures called the gas gland and ovale respectively. The pneumatic duct that connects the gut and gas bladder is present in the embryos of these fish but it is lost during development. This anatomical state (the physoclistous condition) is believed to be evolutionarily derived from the ancestral physostomous state.

Some fishes, such as eels, are anatomically physostomous, but their gas bladders function similar to those of physoclists.

== See also ==
- Physostome
