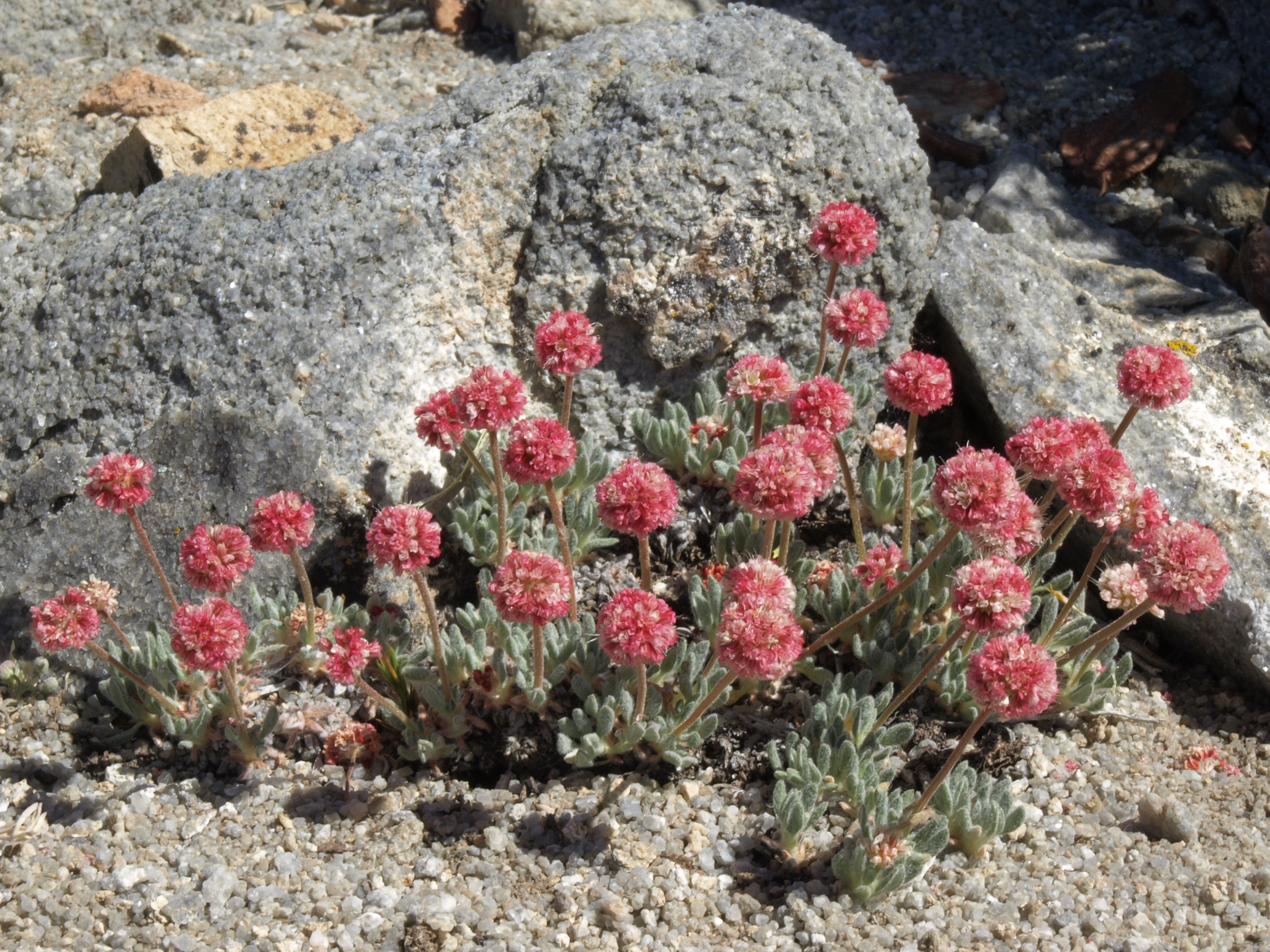

Conservation status
- Vulnerable (NatureServe)

Scientific classification
- Kingdom: Plantae
- Clade: Embryophytes
- Clade: Tracheophytes
- Clade: Spermatophytes
- Clade: Angiosperms
- Clade: Eudicots
- Order: Caryophyllales
- Family: Polygonaceae
- Genus: Eriogonum
- Species: E. gracilipes

Binomial name
- Eriogonum gracilipes S.Wats.

= Eriogonum gracilipes =

Species of flowering plant

Eriogonum gracilipes is a species of wild buckwheat known by the common name White Mountains buckwheat.

It is found in granite and sandstone gravels on the slopes of the southern Sierra Nevada and Inyo Mountains of California and the White Mountains of California and Nevada.

== Description ==
Eriogonum gracilipes is a small perennial herb that grows in flat mats up to 20 centimeters (7.9 in) wide. Its leaves, each under two centimeters long, have a coat of dense white hairs and grow in packed clusters on the ground.

The plant blooms in stalks holding rounded clusters of bright raspberry red flowers, each only a few millimeters wide.

== Taxonomy ==
Eriogonum gracilipes was scientifically described and named by Sereno Watson in 1889. It is classified in the genus Eriogonum within the Polygonaceae family. Although listed as accepted by Plants of the World Online, it has been described as a subspecies of Eriogonum kennedyi in 1936 by Susan Gabriella Stokes and a variety of Eriogonum ochrocephalum in 1963 by John Thomas Howell.
