= Marine vertebrate =

Marine animals with a vertebrate column

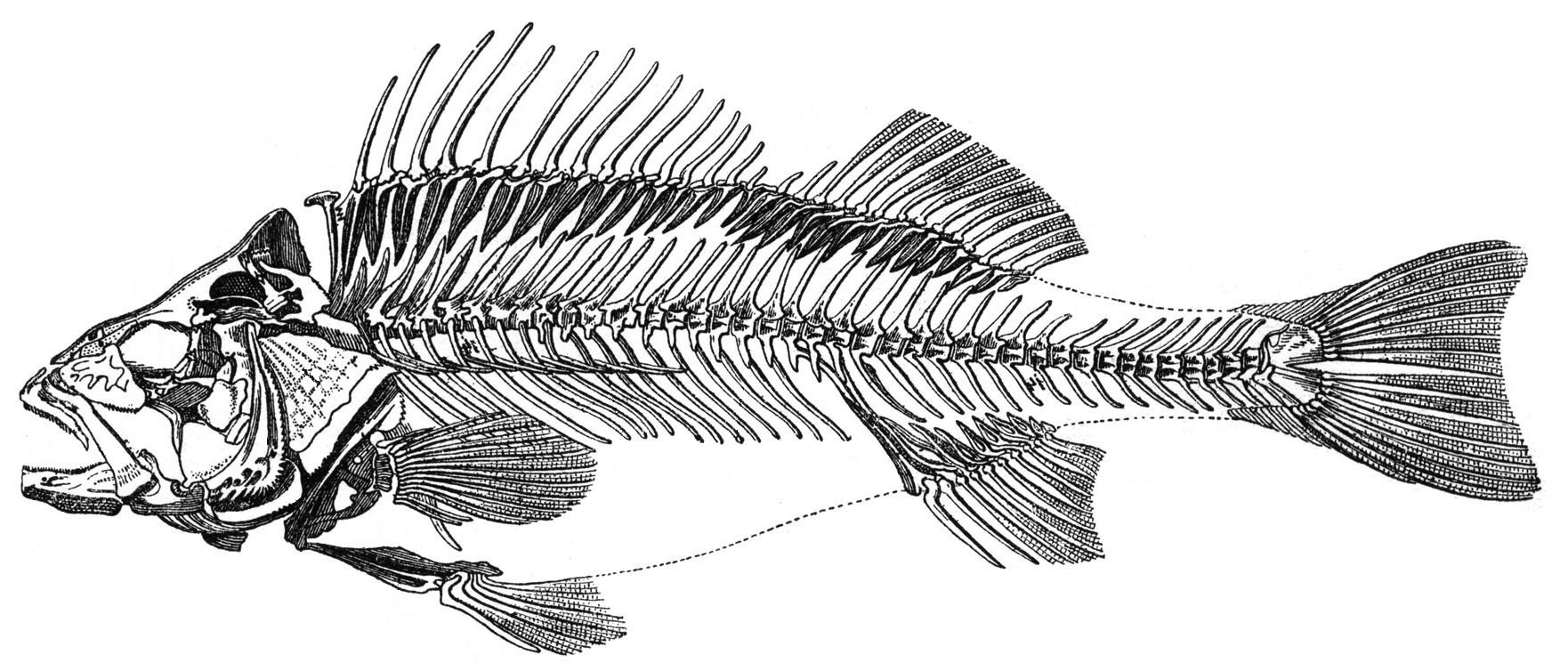
Ray-finned fish

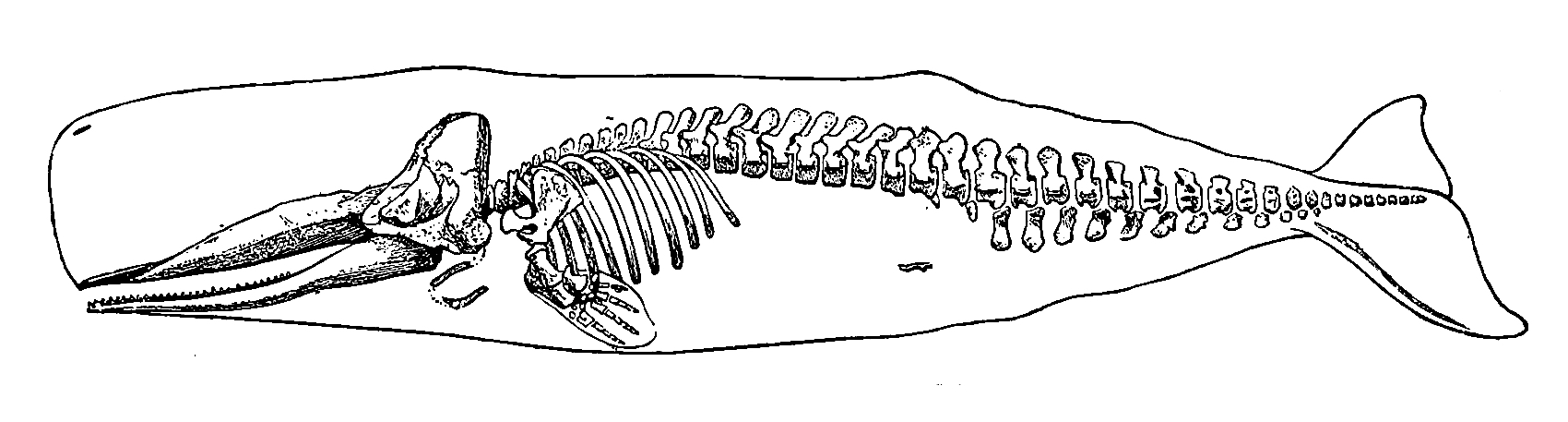
Marine tetrapod (sperm whale)

Internal skeletal structures showing the vertebral column running from the head to the tail

Marine vertebrates are vertebrates that live in marine environments, which include saltwater fish (including pelagic, coral and deep sea fish) and marine tetrapods (primarily marine mammals and marine reptiles, as well as semiaquatic clades such as seabirds). As a subphylum of chordates, all vertebrates have evolved a vertebral column (backbone) based around the embryonic notochord (which becomes the intervertebral discs), forming the core structural support of an internal skeleton, and also serves to enclose and protect the spinal cord.

Compared to other marine animals, marine vertebrates are distinctly more nektonic, and their aquatic locomotions rely mainly on propulsion by the tail and paired appendages such as fins, flippers and webbed limbs. Marine vertebrates also have a far more centralized nervous system than marine invertebrates, with most of the higher functions cephalized and monopolized by the brain; and most of them have evolved myelinated central and peripheral nerve system, which increases conduction speeds significantly. The combination of endoskeleton (which allows much larger body sizes for the same skeletal mass) and a more robust and efficient nervous system (which enables more acute perception and more sophisticated motor control) gives vertebrates much quicker body reactivity and behavioral adaptability, which have led to marine vertebrates dominating most of the higher-level niches in the marine ecosystems.

== Marine fish ==
Fish fall into two main groups: fish with bony internal skeletons and fish with cartilaginous internal skeletons. Fish anatomy and physiology generally includes a two-chambered heart, eyes adapted to seeing underwater, and a skin protected by scales and mucous. They typically breathe by extracting oxygen from water through gills. Fish use fins to propel and stabilise themselves in the water. Over 33,000 species of fish have been described as of 2017, of which about 20,000 are marine fish.

=== Jawless fish ===
Hagfish form a class of about 20 species of eel-shaped, slime-producing marine fish. They are the only known living animals that have a skull but no vertebral column. Lampreys form a superclass containing 38 known extant species of jawless fish. The adult lamprey is characterized by a toothed, funnel-like sucking mouth. Although they are well known for boring into the flesh of other fish to suck their blood, only 18 species of lampreys are actually parasitic. Together hagfish and lampreys are the sister group to vertebrates. Living hagfish remain similar to hagfish from around 300 million years ago. The lampreys are a very ancient lineage of vertebrates, though their exact relationship to hagfishes and jawed vertebrates is still a matter of dispute. Molecular analysis since 1992 has suggested that hagfish are most closely related to lampreys, and so also are vertebrates in a monophyletic sense. Others consider them a sister group of vertebrates in the common taxon of craniata.

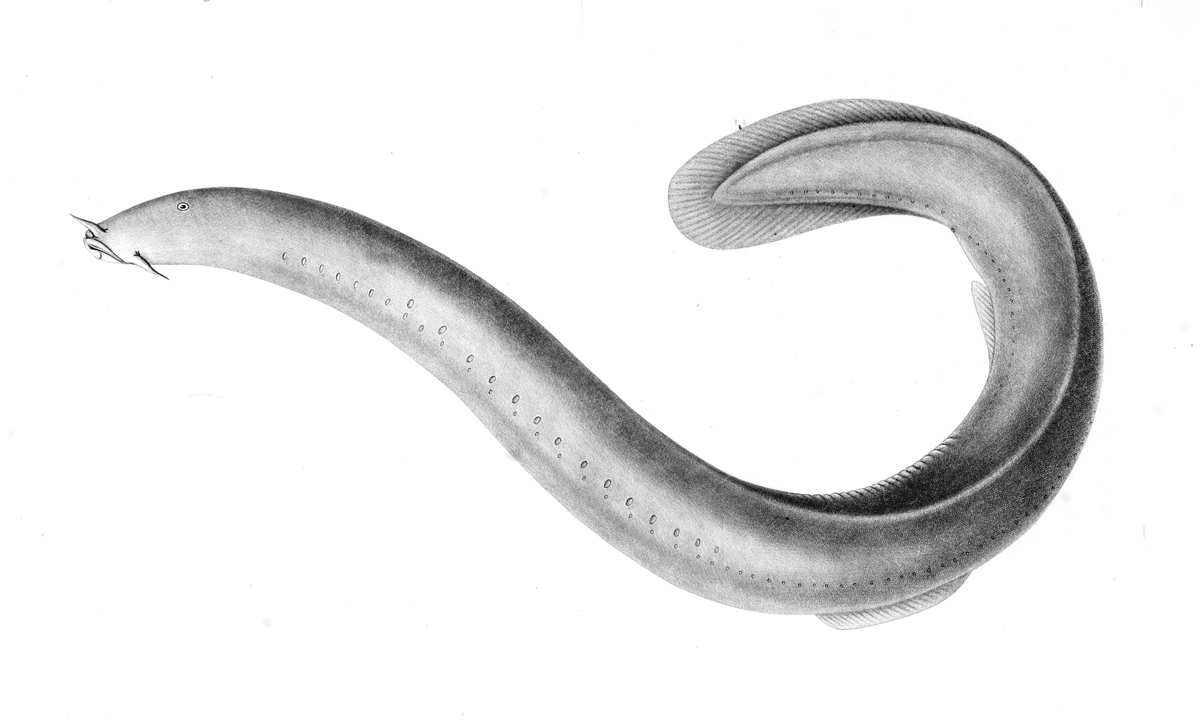
Hagfish are the only known living animals with a skull but no vertebral column.

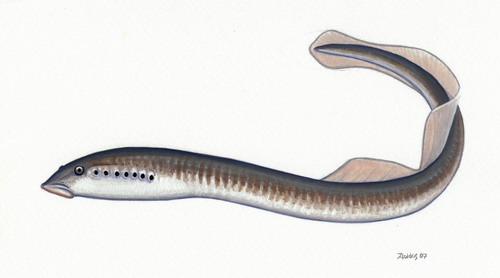
Lampreys are often parasitic and have a toothed, funnel-like sucking mouth

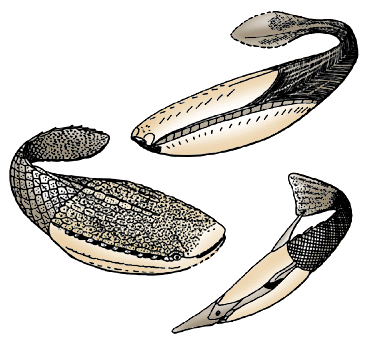
The extinct Pteraspidomorphi, ancestral to jawed vertebrates

Pteraspidomorphi is an extinct class of early jawless fish ancestral to jawed vertebrates. The few characteristics they share with the latter are now considered as primitive for all vertebrates.

=== Cartilaginous fish ===
Cartilaginous fish, such as sharks and rays, have jaws and skeletons made of cartilage rather than bone. Megalodon is an extinct species of shark that lived about 28 to 1.5 Ma. It looked much like a stocky version of the great white shark, but was much larger with fossil lengths reaching 20.3 metres (67 ft). Found in all oceans it was one of the largest and most powerful predators in vertebrate history, and probably had a profound impact on marine life. The Greenland shark has the longest known lifespan of all vertebrates, about 400 years.

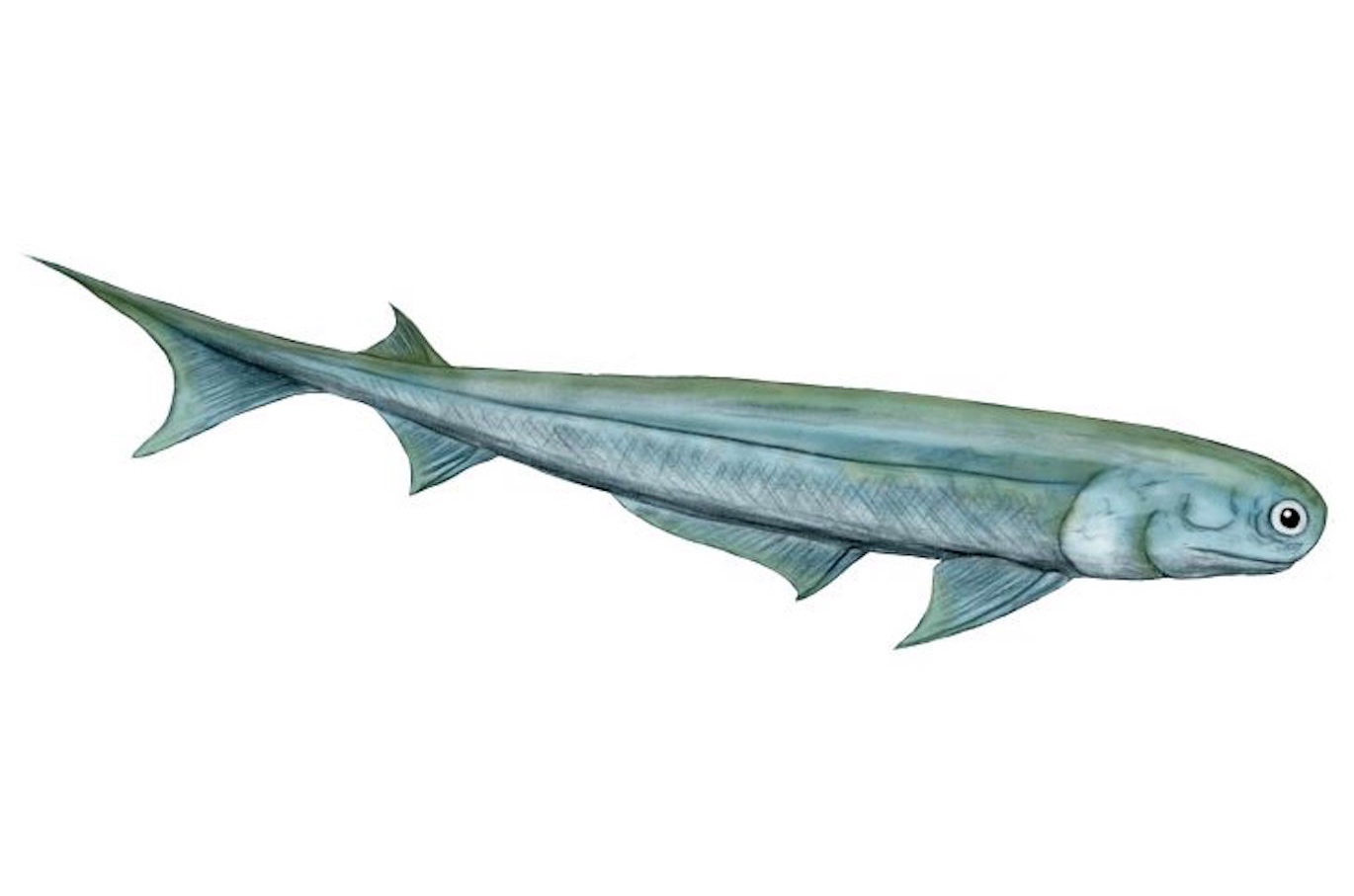
Cartilaginous fishes may have evolved from spiny sharks

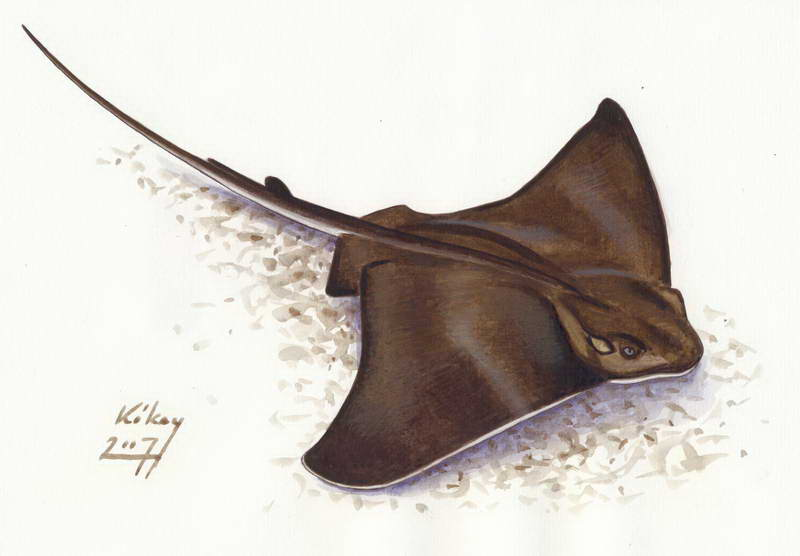
Stingray

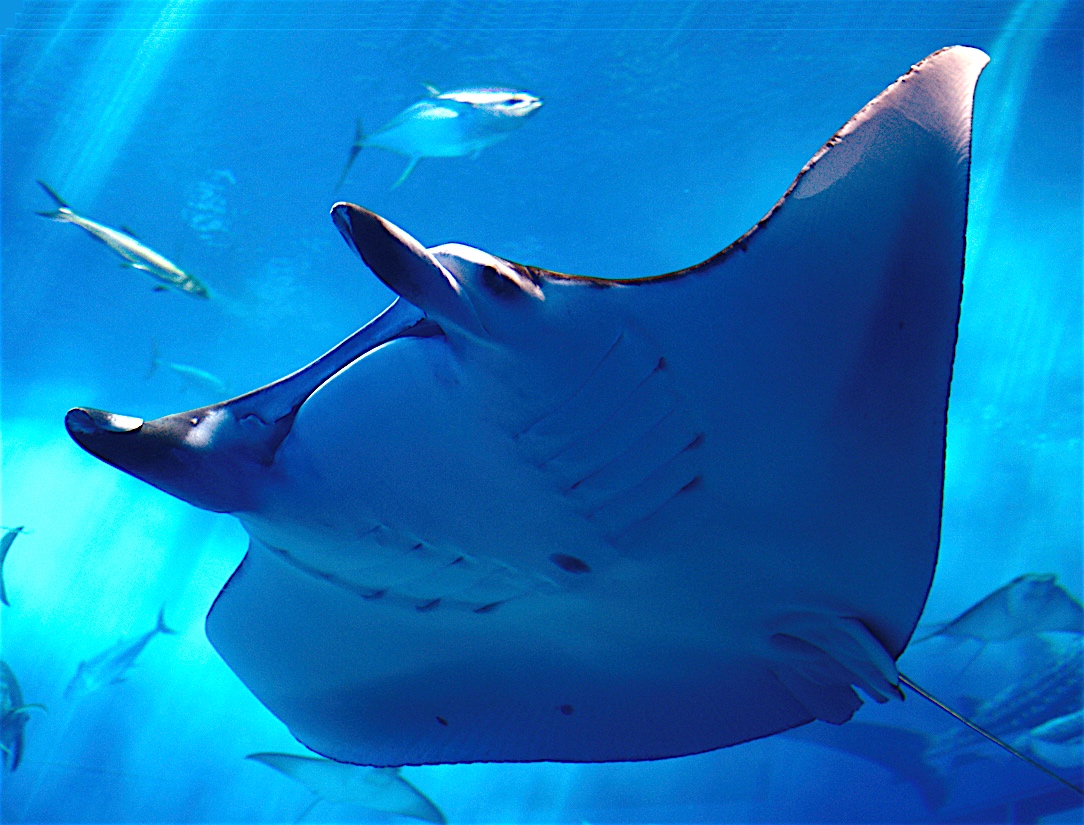
The manta ray, largest ray in the world, has been targeted by fisheries and is now vulnerable.

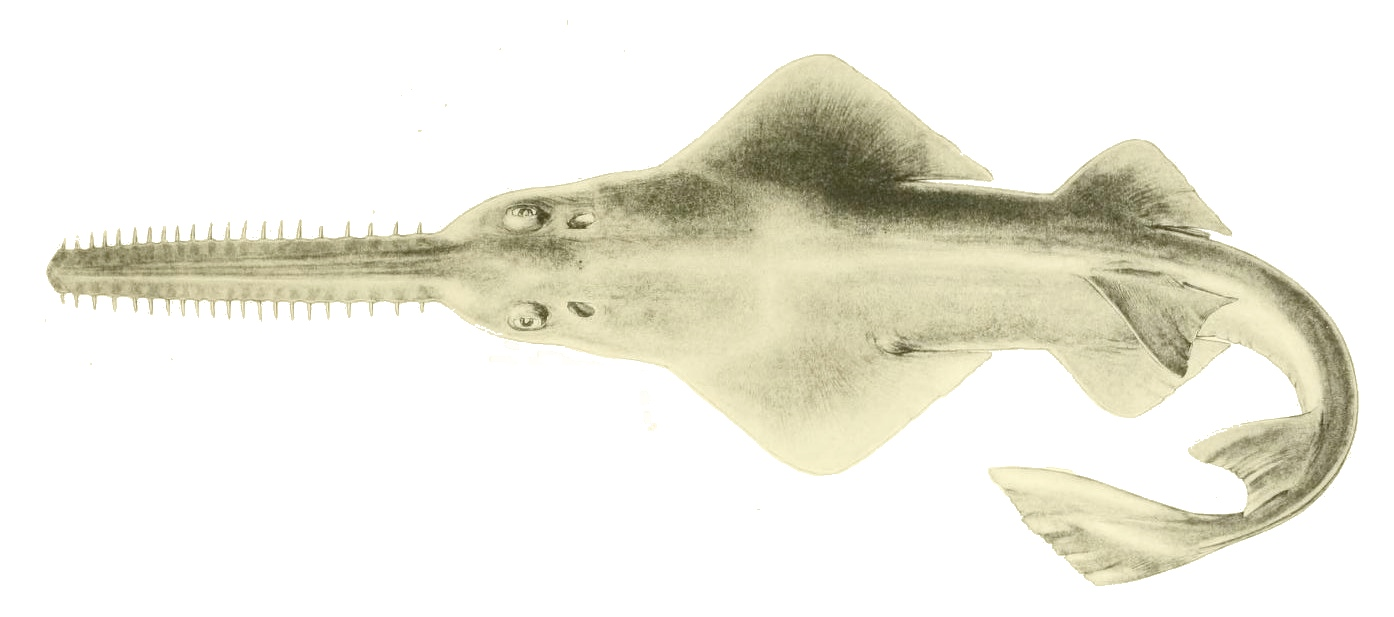
Sawfish are rays with long rostrums resembling a saw. All are now endangered or critically endangered
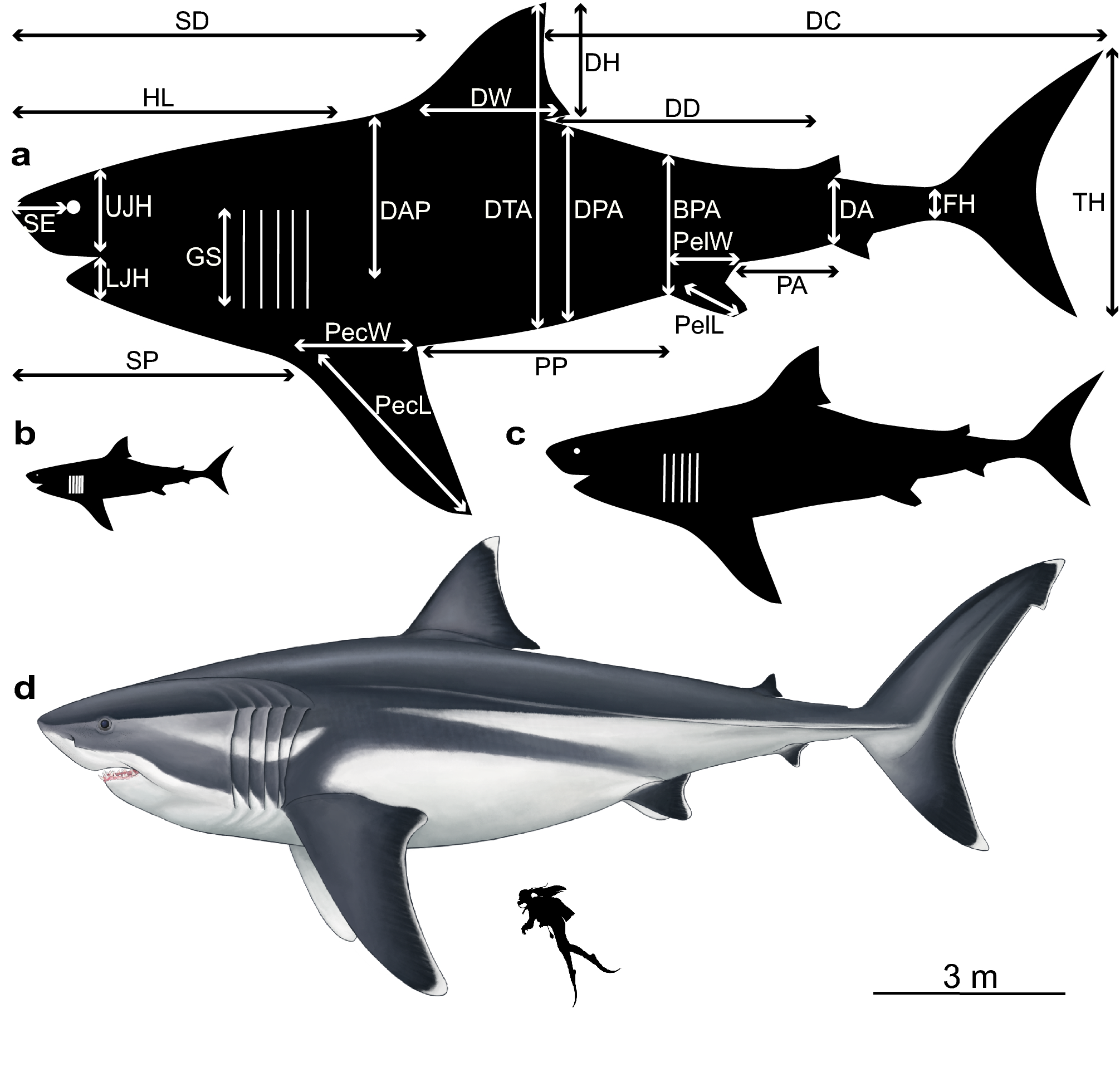
The extinct megalodon resembled a giant great white shark

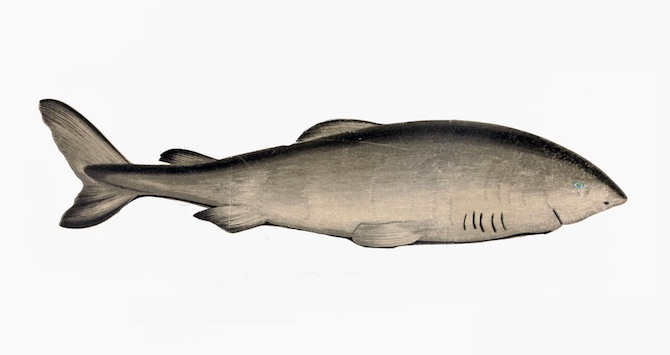
The Greenland shark lives longer than any other vertebrate

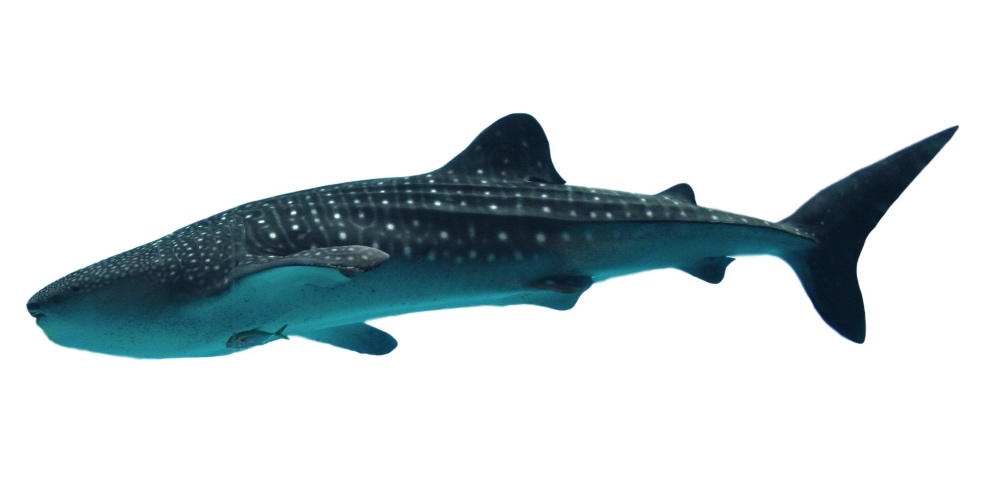
The largest extant fish, the whale shark, is now a vulnerable species

=== Bony fish ===
Bony fish have jaws and skeletons made of bone rather than cartilage. About 90% of the world's fish species are bony fish. Bony fish also have hard, bony plates called operculum which help them respire and protect their gills, and they often possess a swim bladder which they use for better control of their buoyancy.

Bony fish can be further divided into those with lobe fins and those with ray fins. Lobe fins have the form of fleshy lobes supported by bony stalks which extend from the body. Lobe fins evolved into the legs of the first tetrapod land vertebrates, so by extension an early ancestor of humans was a lobe-finned fish. Apart from the coelacanths and the lungfishes, lobe-finned fishes are now extinct. The rest of the modern fish have ray fins. These are made of webs of skin supported by bony or horny spines (rays) which can be erected to control the fin stiffness.

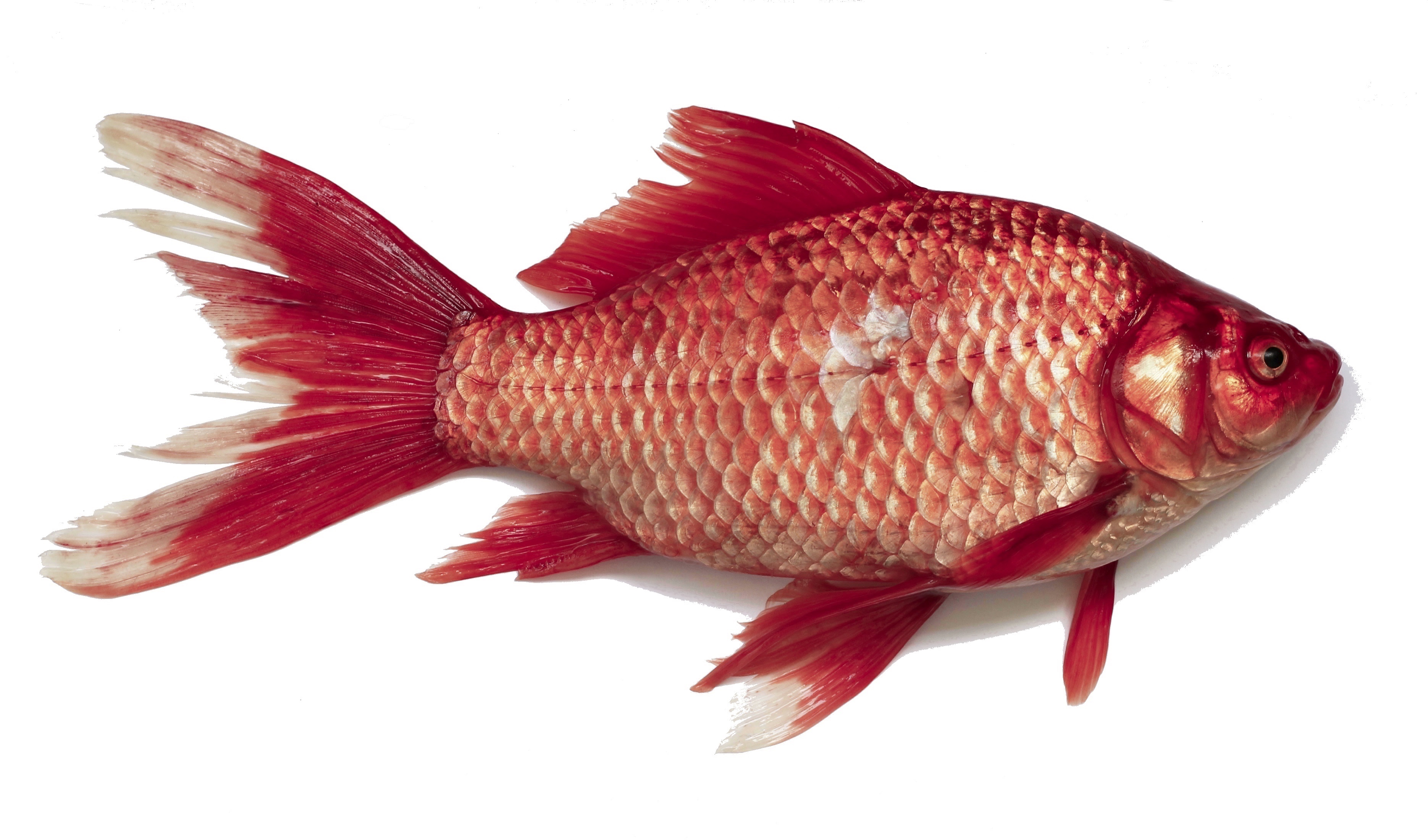
Ray-finned fish (Prussian carp)

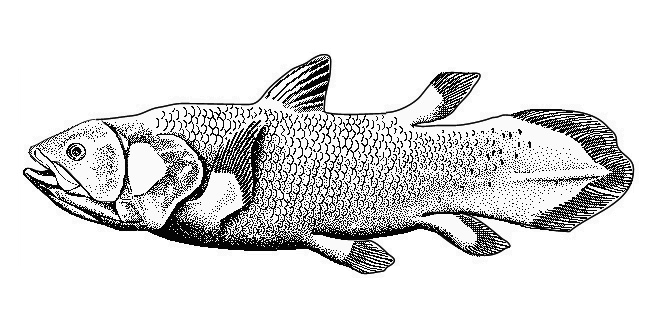
Lobe-finned fish
(coelacanth)

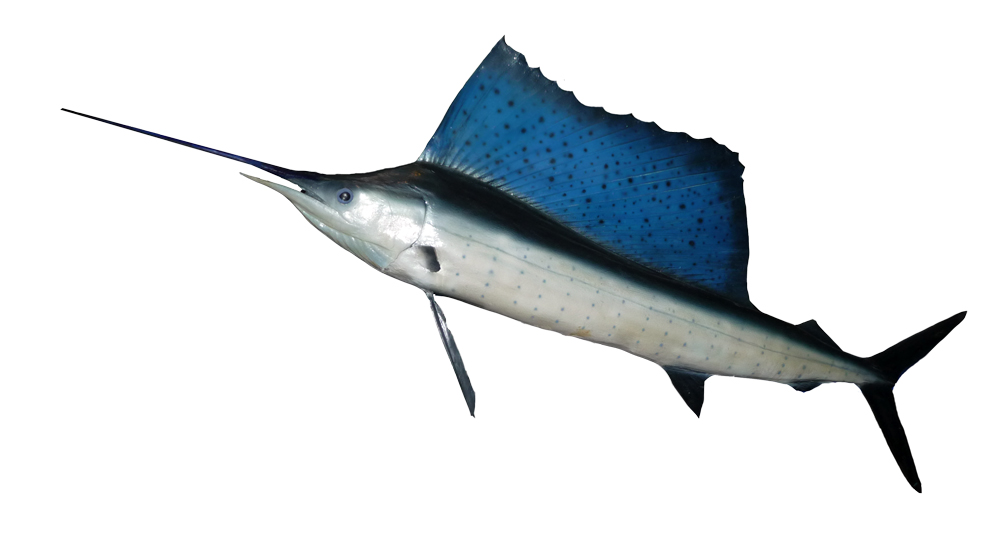
Sailfish

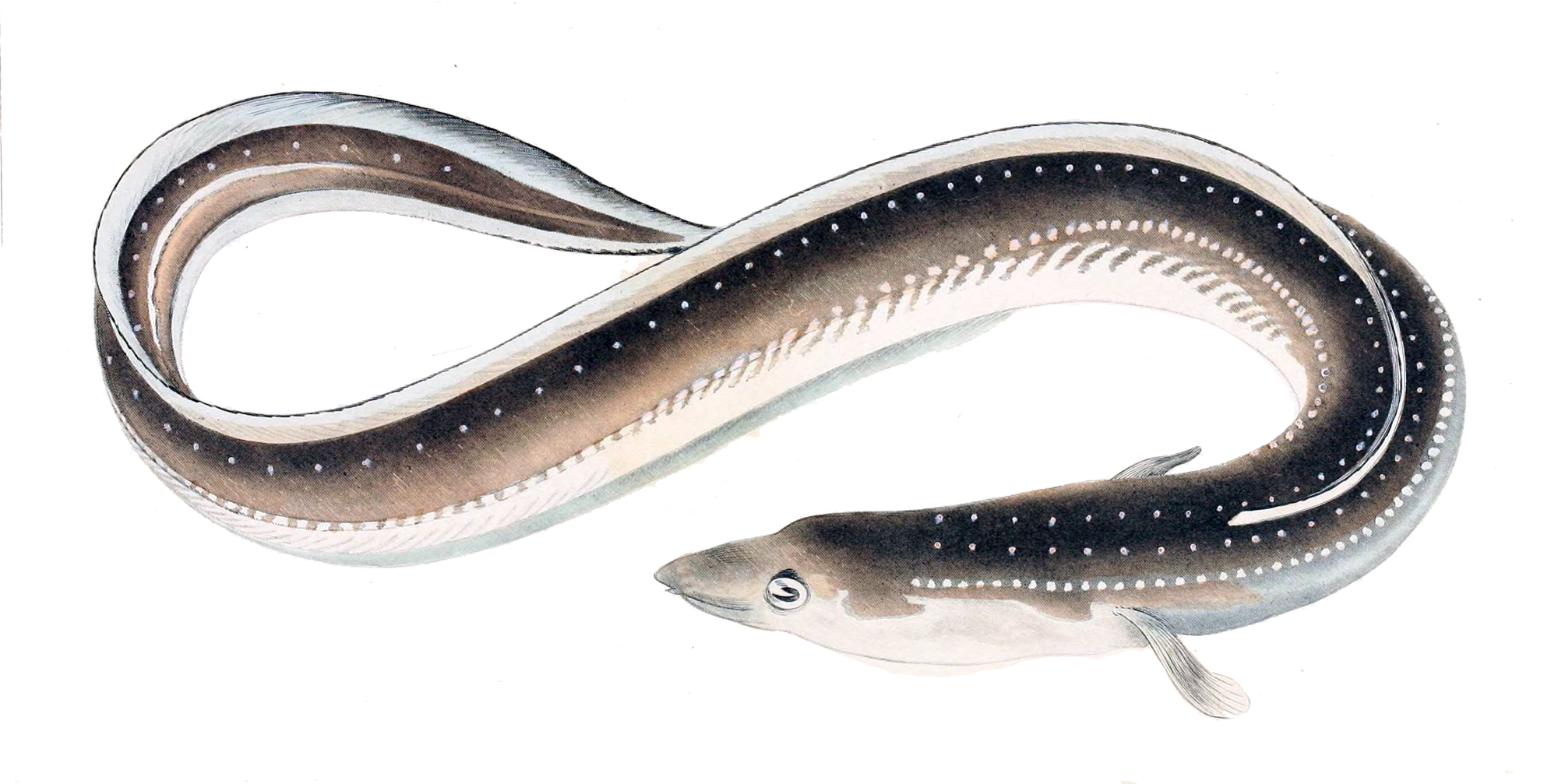
Eel

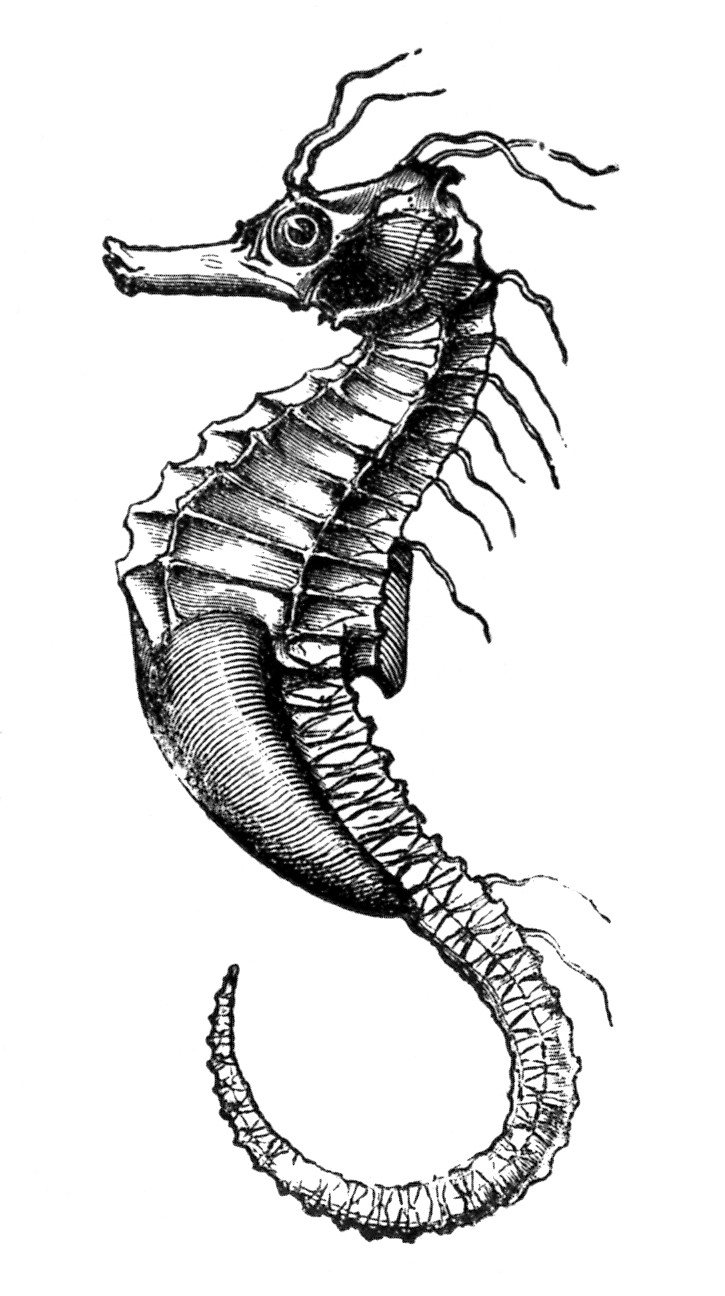
Sea-
horse
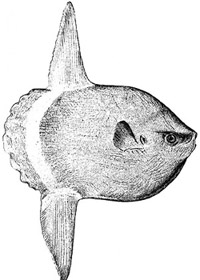
Ocean sunfish

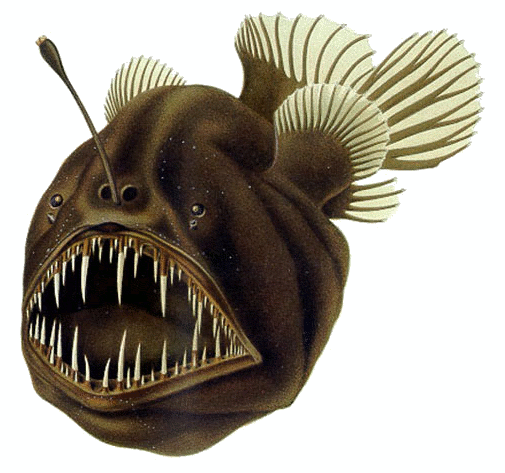
Anglerfish

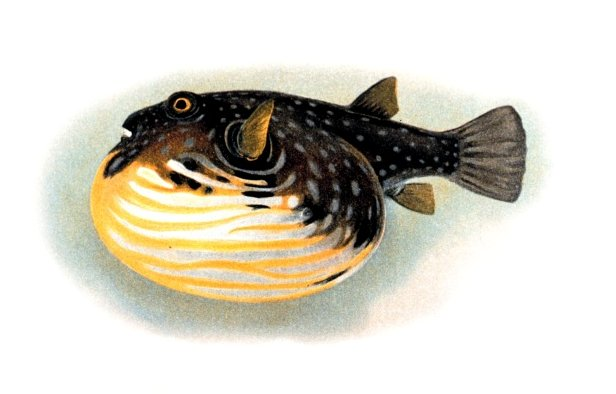
Pufferfish

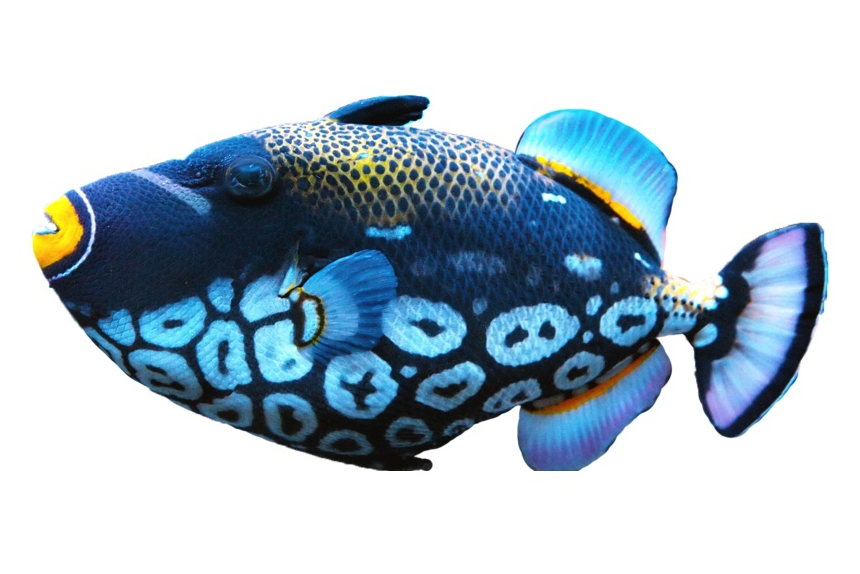
Clown triggerfish

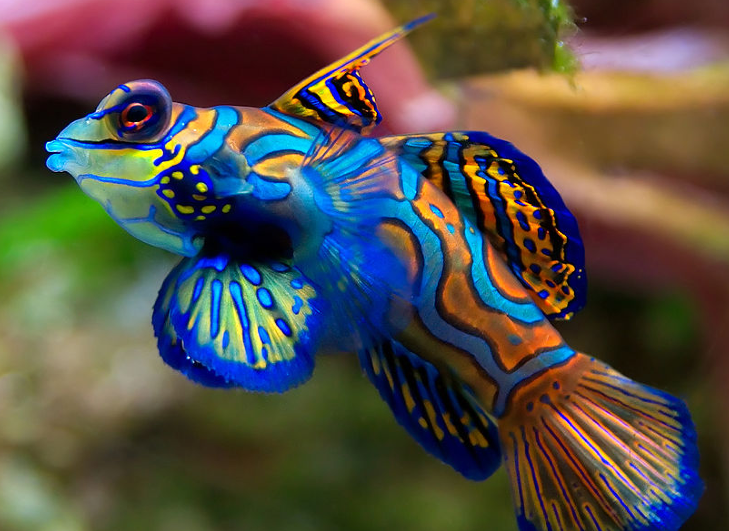
Mandarin dragonet

== Marine tetrapods ==
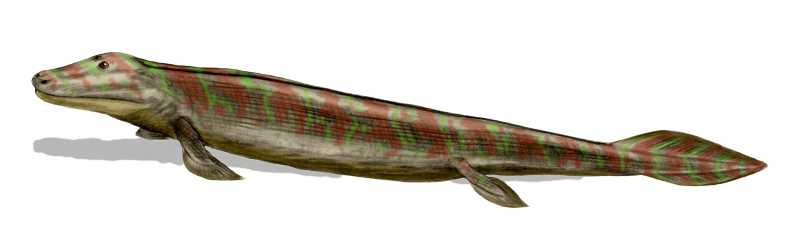
Some lobe-finned fishes, like the extinct Tiktaalik, developed limb-like fins that could take them onto land

A tetrapod (Greek for four feet) is a vertebrate with limbs (feet). Tetrapods evolved from ancient lobe-finned fishes about 400 million years ago during the Devonian Period when their earliest ancestors emerged from the sea and adapted to living on land. This change from a body plan for breathing and navigating in gravity-neutral water to a body plan with mechanisms enabling the animal to breathe in air without dehydrating and move on land is one of the most profound evolutionary changes known. Tetrapods can be divided into four classes: amphibians, reptiles, birds and mammals.

Marine tetrapods are tetrapods that returned from land back to the sea again. The first returns to the ocean may have occurred as early as the Carboniferous Period whereas other returns occurred as recently as the Cenozoic, as in cetaceans, pinnipeds, and several modern amphibians.

=== Amphibians ===
Amphibians (Greek for both kinds of life) live part of their life in water and part on land. They mostly require fresh water to reproduce. A few inhabit brackish water, but there are no true marine amphibians. There have been reports, however, of amphibians invading marine waters, such as a Black Sea invasion by the natural hybrid Pelophylax esculentus reported in 2010.

=== Reptiles ===
Reptiles (Late Latin for creeping or crawling) do not have an aquatic larval stage, and in this way are unlike amphibians. Most reptiles are oviparous, although several species of squamates are viviparous, as were some extinct aquatic clades — the fetus develops within the mother, contained in a placenta rather than an eggshell. As amniotes, reptile eggs are surrounded by membranes for protection and transport, which adapt them to reproduction on dry land. Many of the viviparous species feed their fetuses through various forms of placenta analogous to those of mammals, with some providing initial care for their hatchlings.

Some reptiles are more closely related to birds than other reptiles, and many scientists prefer to make Reptilia a monophyletic group which includes the birds. Extant non-avian reptiles which inhabit or frequent the sea include sea turtles, sea snakes, terrapins, the marine iguana, and the saltwater crocodile. Currently, of the approximately 12,000 extant reptile species and sub-species, only about 100 of are classed as marine reptiles.

Except for some sea snakes, most extant marine reptiles are oviparous and need to return to land to lay their eggs. Apart from sea turtles, the species usually spend most of their lives on or near land rather than in the ocean. Sea snakes generally prefer shallow waters nearby land, around islands, especially waters that are somewhat sheltered, as well as near estuaries. Unlike land snakes, sea snakes have evolved flattened tails which help them swim.

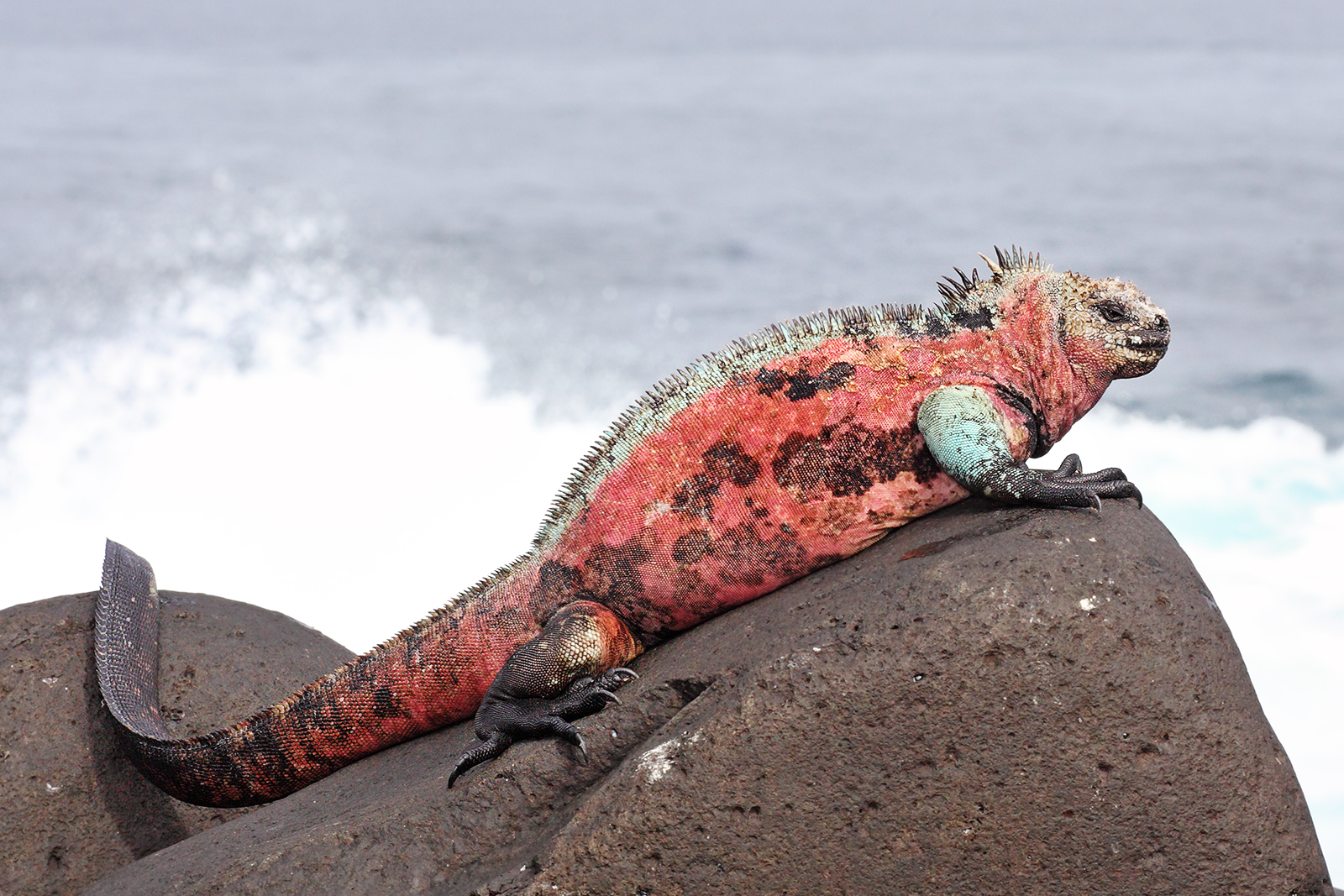
Marine iguana

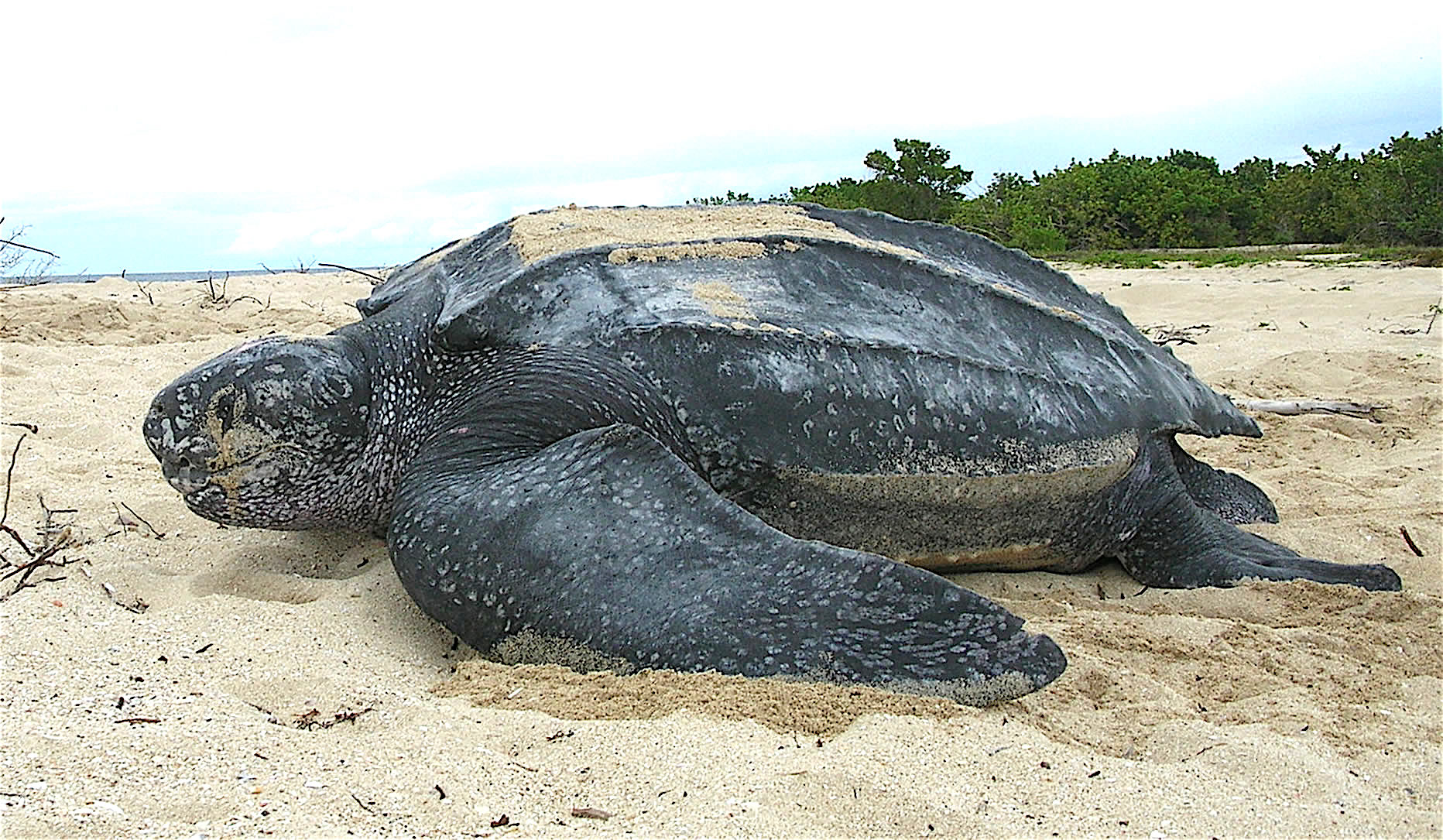
Leatherback sea turtle

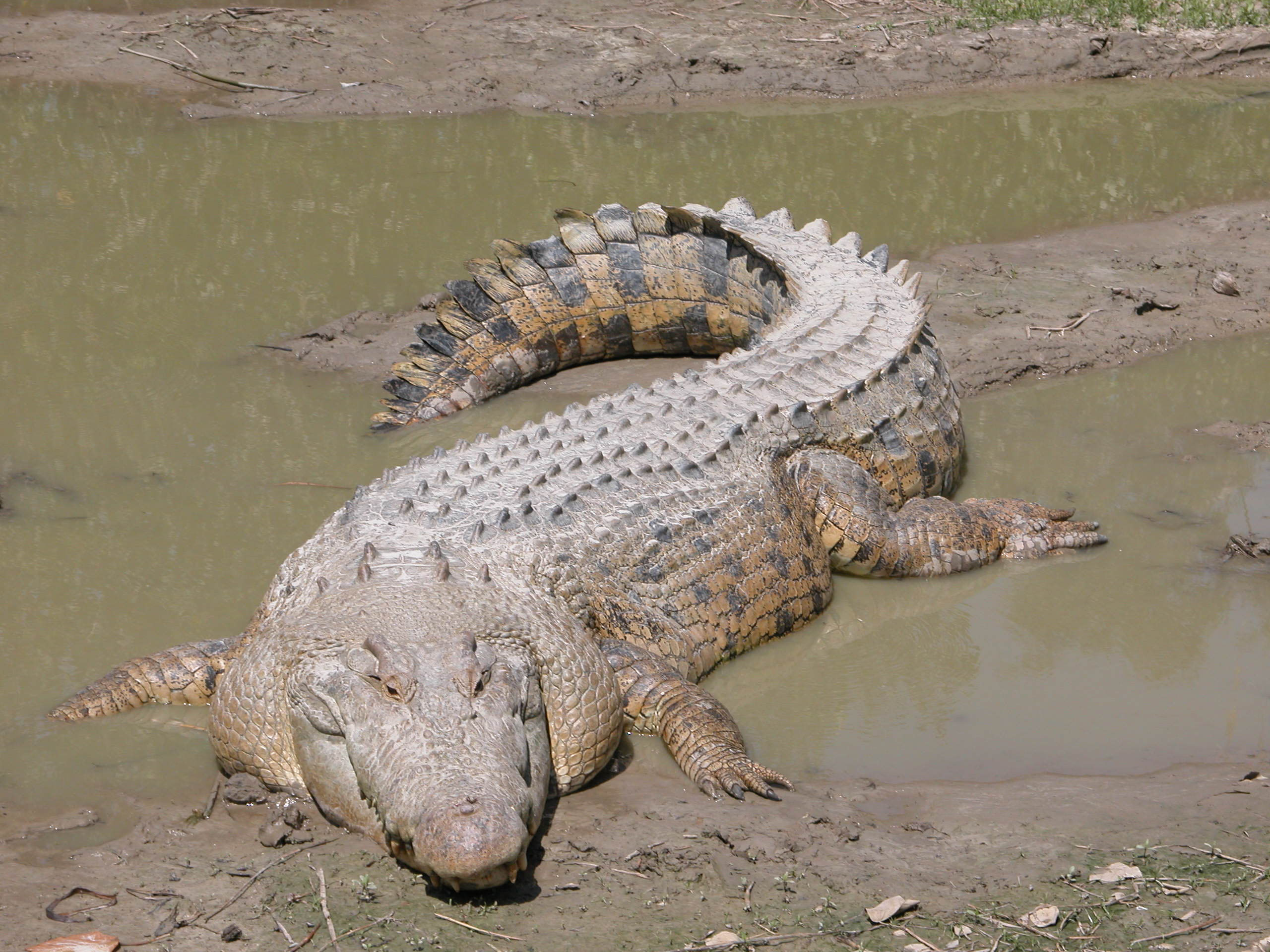
Saltwater crocodile

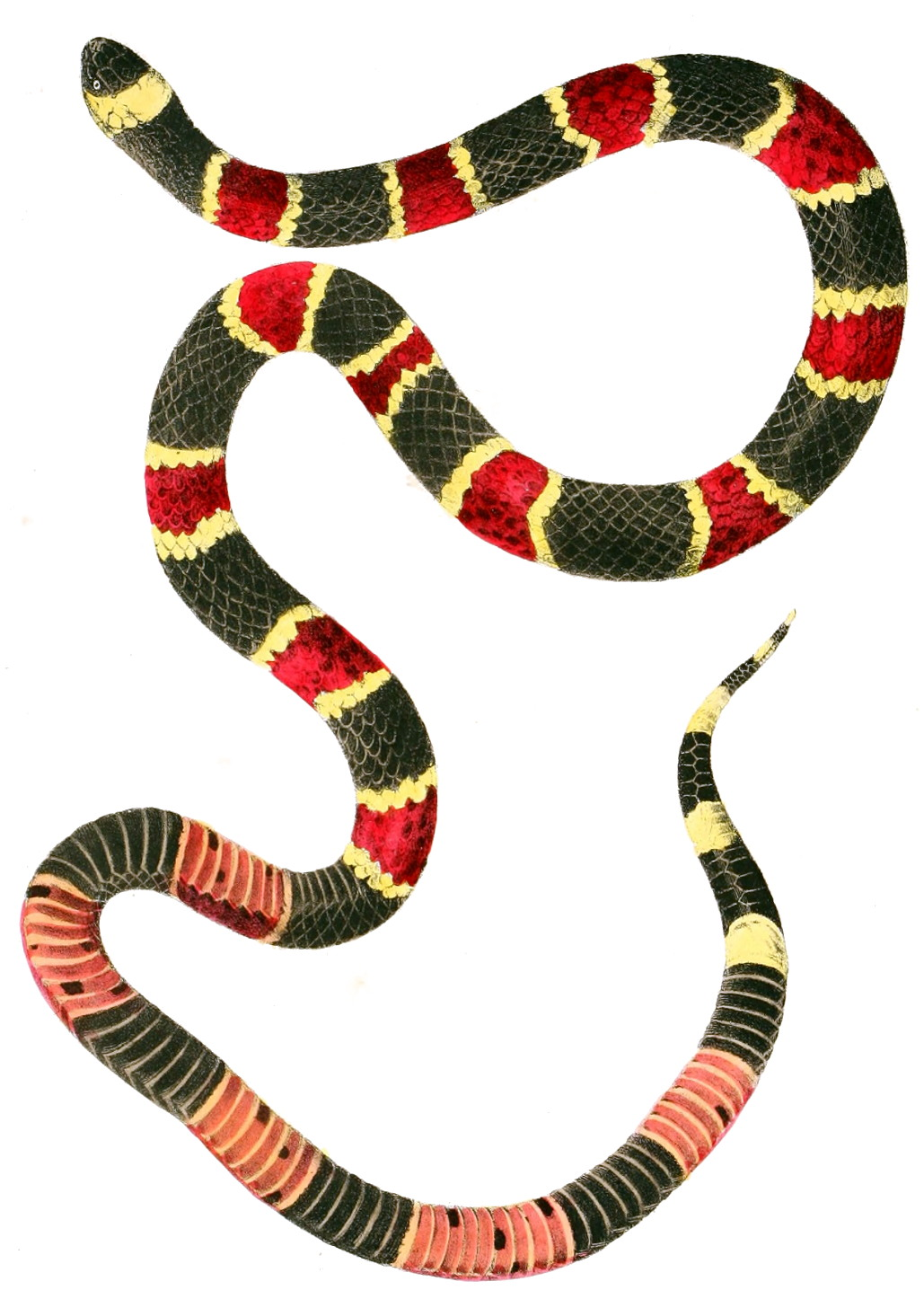
Marine snakes have flattened tails

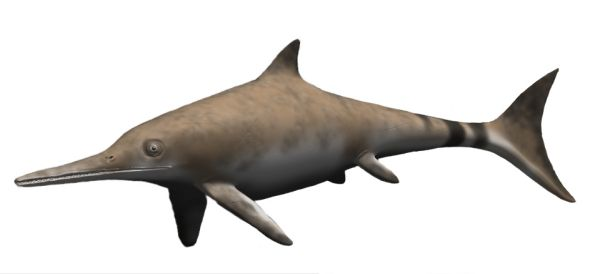
The ancient Ichthyosaurus communis independently evolved flippers similar to dolphins

Some extinct marine reptiles, such as ichthyosaurs, evolved to be viviparous and had no requirement to return to land. Ichthyosaurs resembled dolphins. They first appeared about 245 million years ago and disappeared about 90 million years ago. The terrestrial ancestor of the ichthyosaur had no features already on its back or tail that might have helped along the evolutionary process. Yet the ichthyosaur developed a dorsal and tail fin which improved its ability to swim. The biologist Stephen Jay Gould said the ichthyosaur was his favourite example of convergent evolution. The earliest marine reptiles arose in the Permian. During the Mesozoic many groups of reptiles became adapted to life in the seas, including ichthyosaurs, plesiosaurs, mosasaurs, nothosaurs, placodonts, sea turtles, thalattosaurs and thalattosuchians. Marine reptiles were less numerous after mass extinction at the end of the Cretaceous.

=== Birds ===
Marine birds are adapted to life within the marine environment. They are often called seabirds. While marine birds vary greatly in lifestyle, behaviour and physiology, they often exhibit striking convergent evolution, as the same environmental problems and feeding niches have resulted in similar adaptations. Examples include albatross, penguins, gannets, and auks.

In general, marine birds live longer, breed later and have fewer young than terrestrial birds do, but they invest a great deal of time in their young. Most species nest in colonies, which can vary in size from a few dozen birds to millions. Many species are famous for undertaking long annual migrations, crossing the equator or circumnavigating the Earth in some cases. They feed both at the ocean's surface and below it, and even feed on each other. Marine birds can be highly pelagic, coastal, or in some cases spend a part of the year away from the sea entirely. Some marine birds plummet from heights, plunging through the water leaving vapour-like trails, similar to that of fighter planes. Gannets plunge into the water at up to 100 kilometres per hour (60 mph). They have air sacs under their skin in their face and chest which act like bubble-wrap, cushioning the impact with the water.

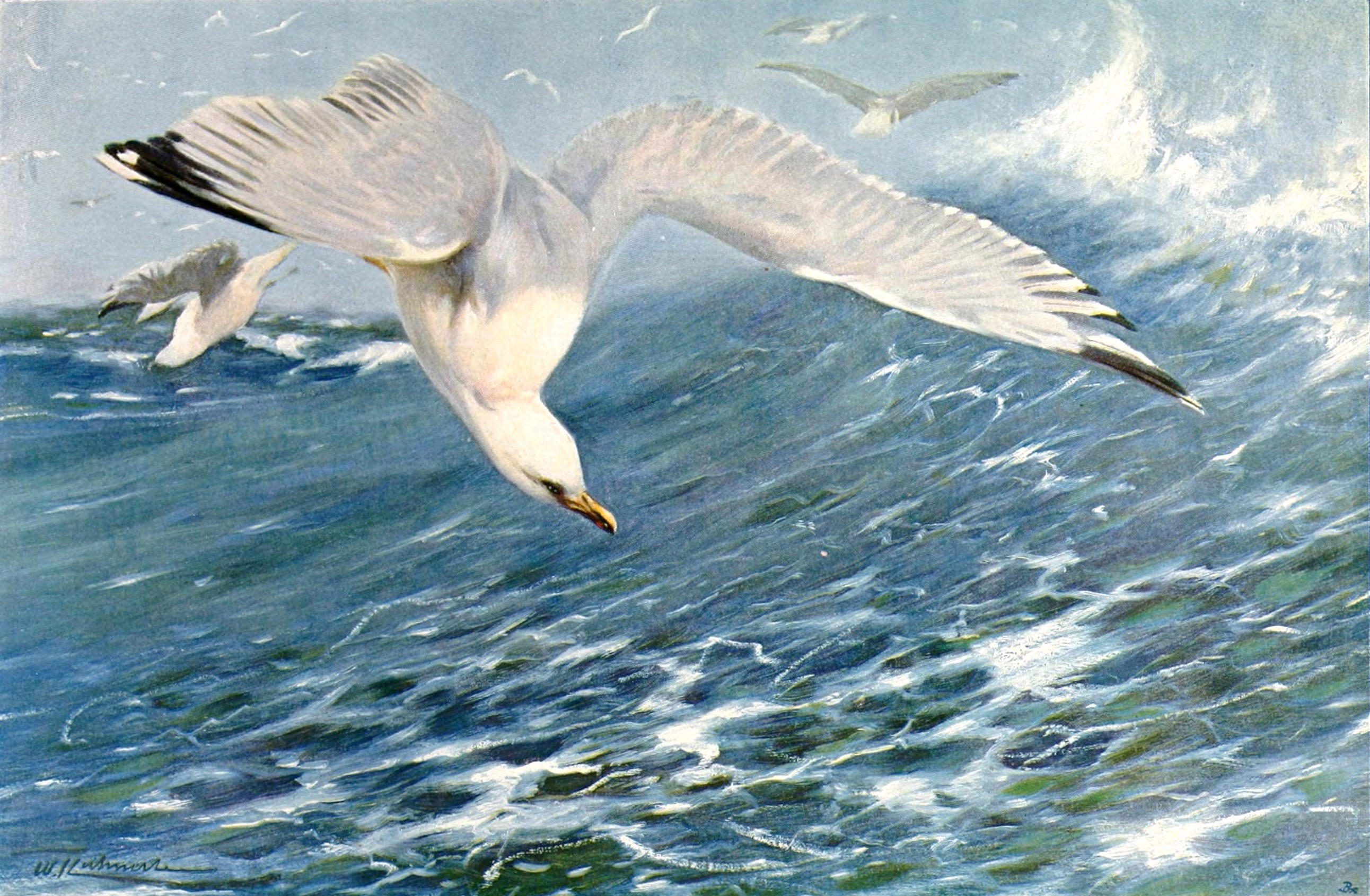
European herring gull attack herring schools from above

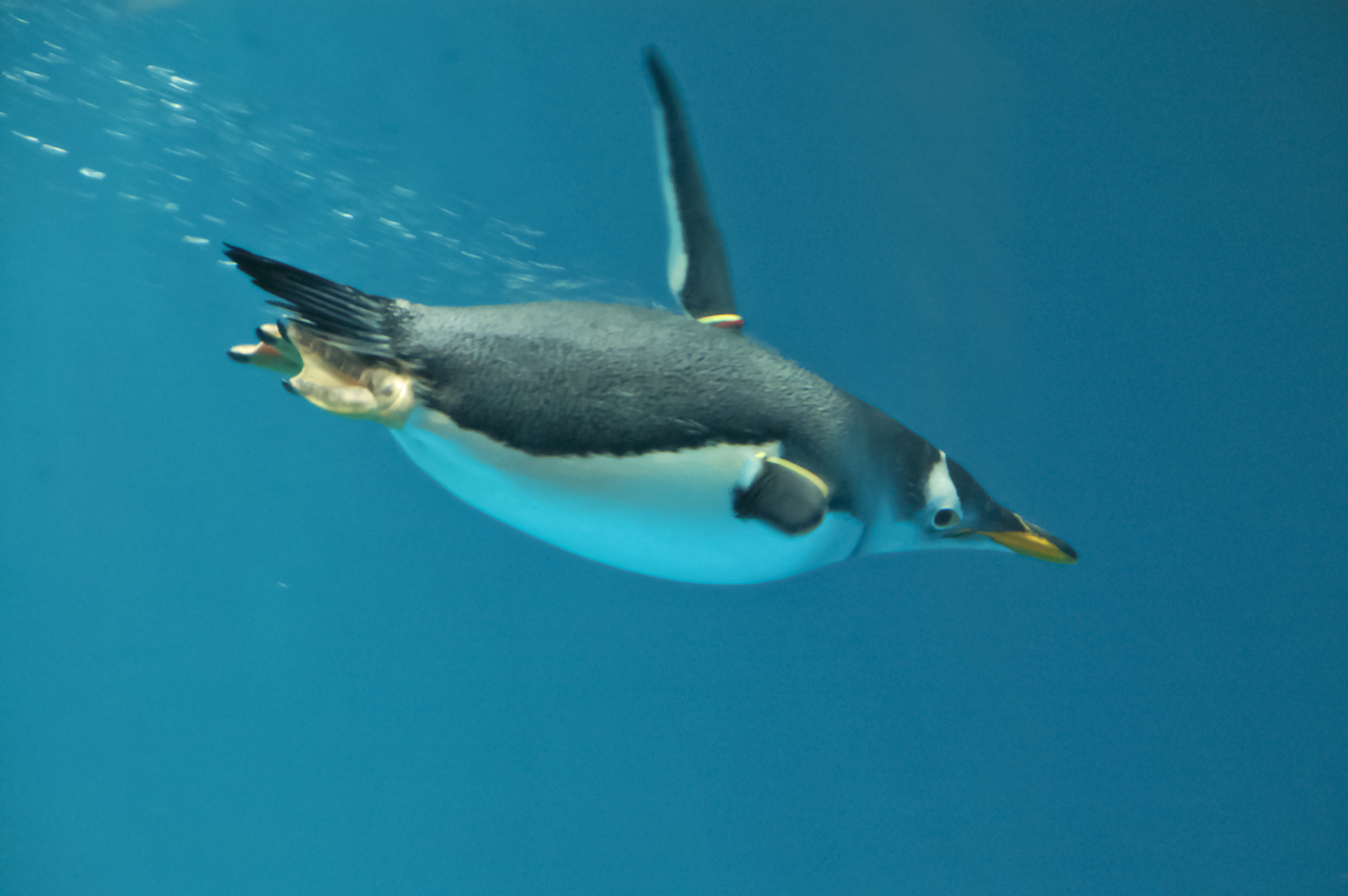
Gentoo penguin swimming underwater

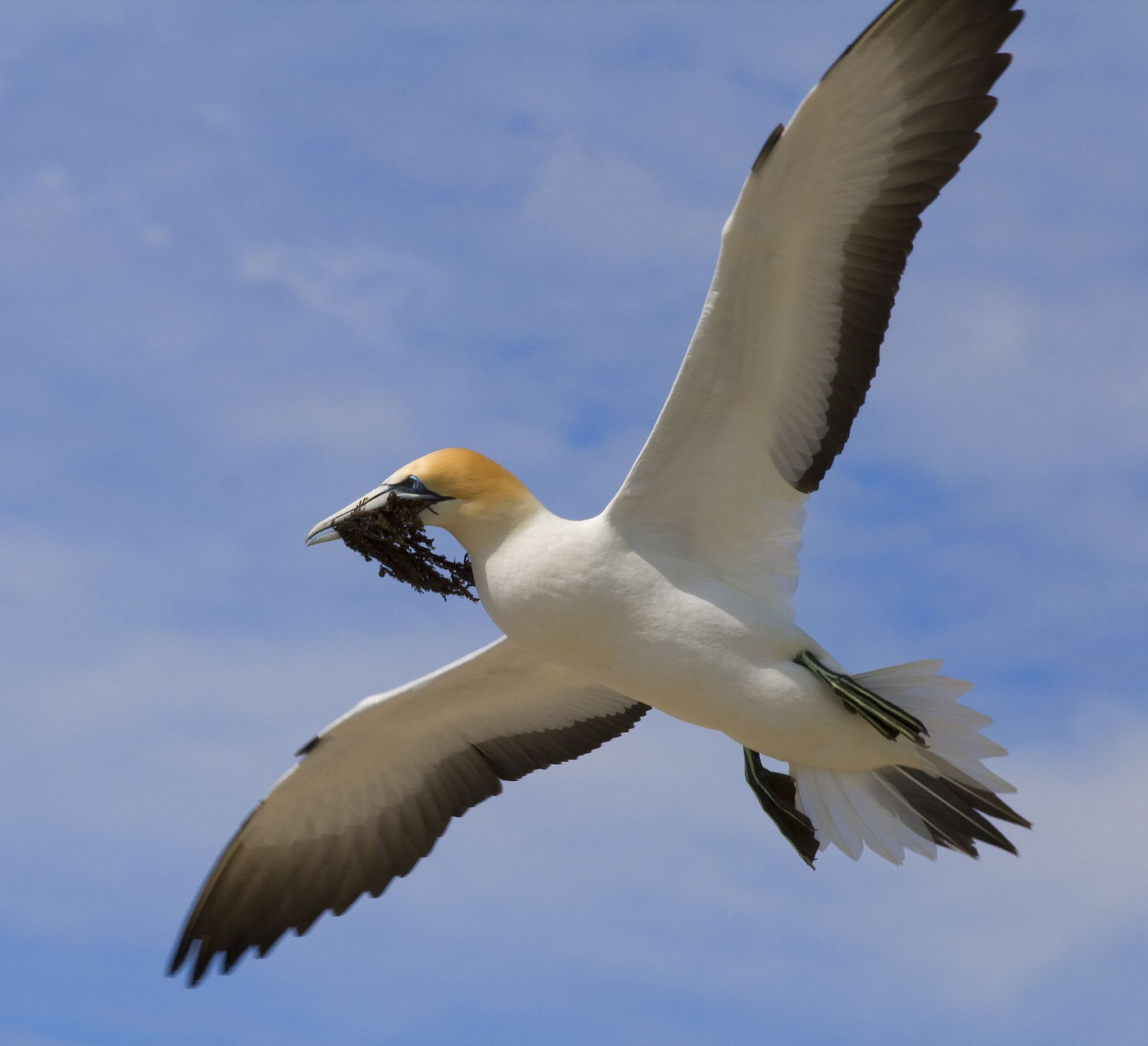
Gannets "divebomb" at high speed

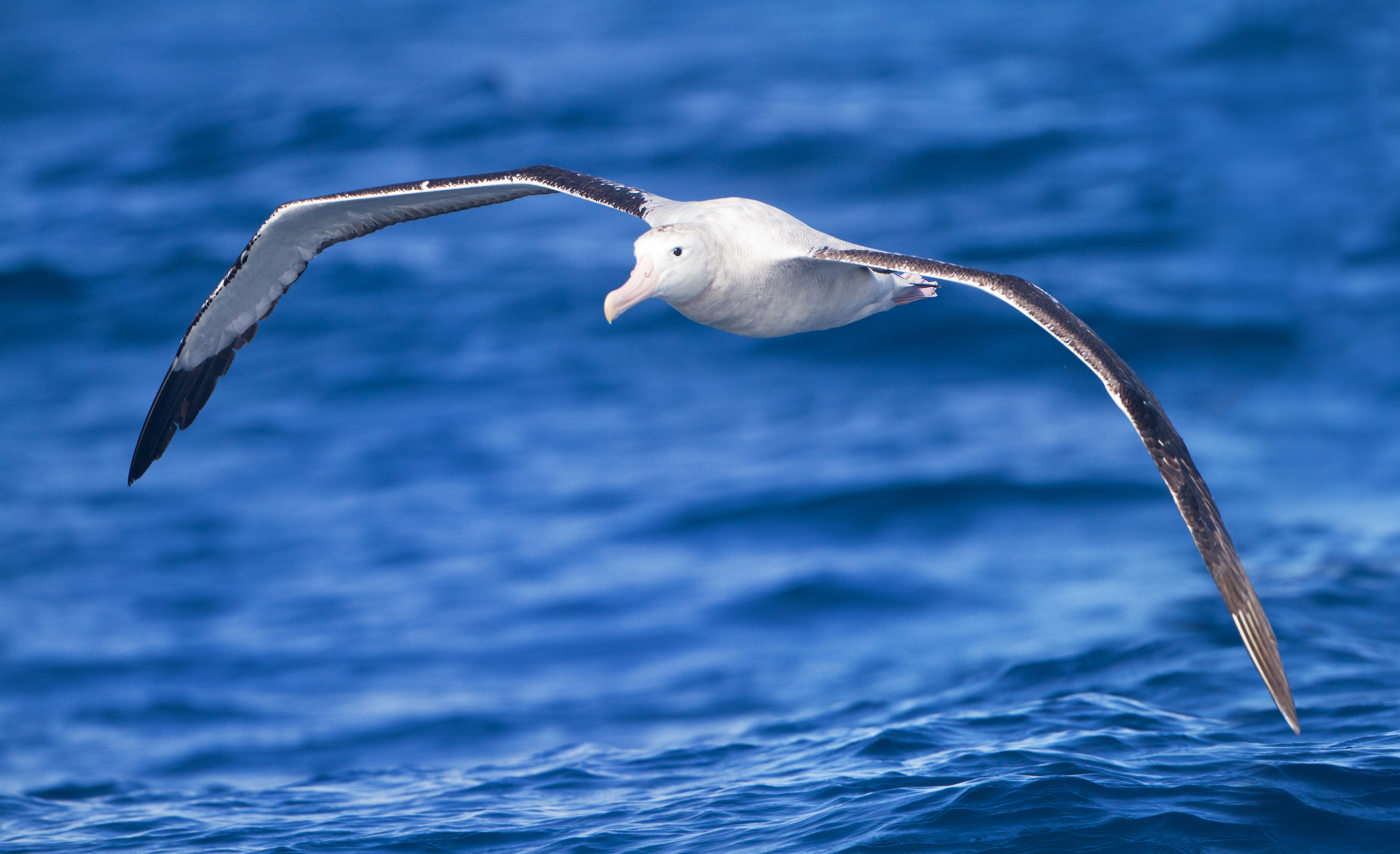
Albatrosses range over huge areas of ocean and regularly circle the globe.

The first marine birds evolved in the Cretaceous period, and modern marine bird families emerged in the Paleogene.

=== Mammals ===
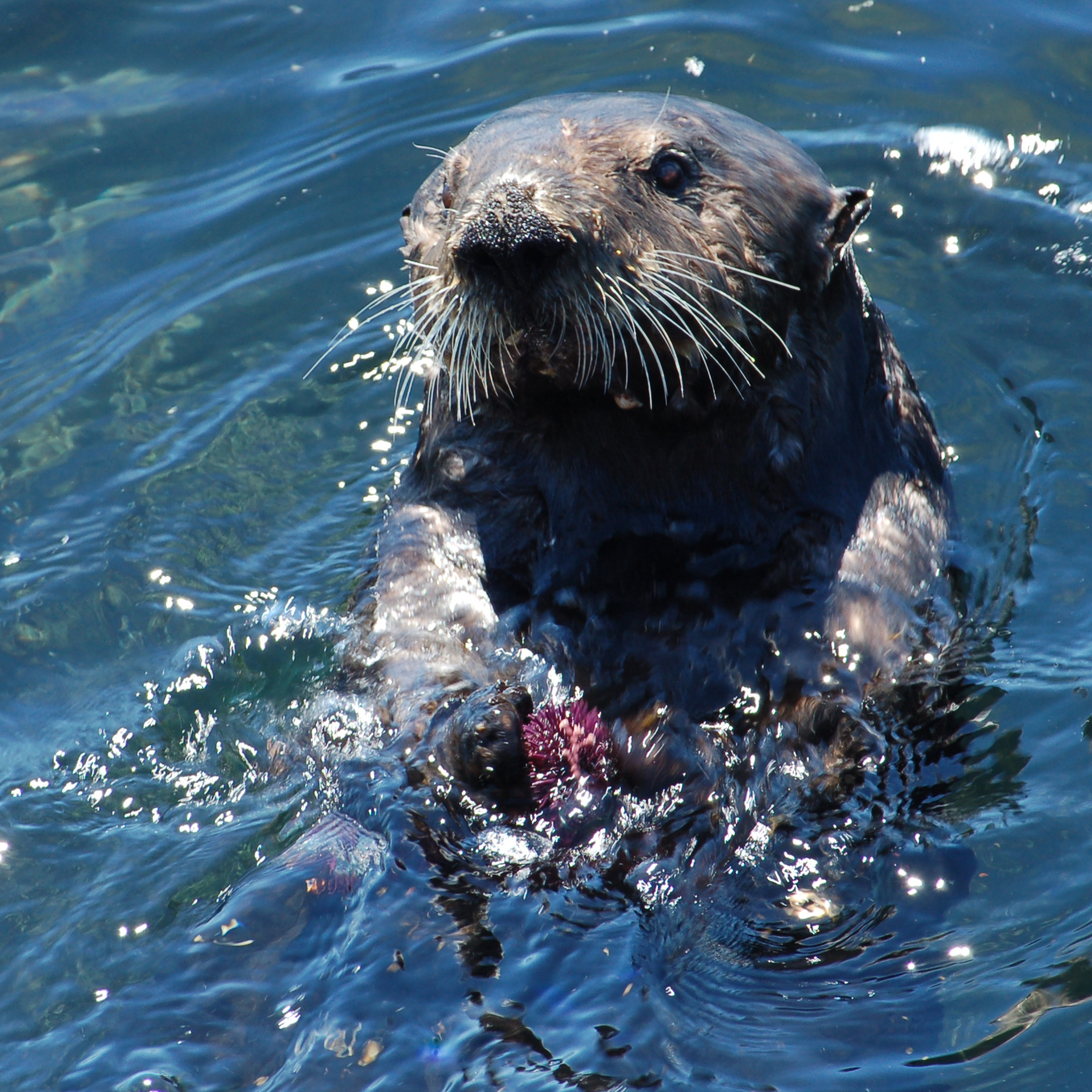
Sea otter, classic keystone species which controls sea urchin numbers

Mammals (from Latin for breast) are characterised by the presence of mammary glands which in females produce milk for feeding (nursing) their young. There are about 130 living and recently extinct marine mammal species such as seals, dolphins, whales, manatees, sea otters and polar bears. They do not represent a distinct taxon or systematic grouping, but are instead unified by their reliance on the marine environment for feeding. Both cetaceans and sirenians are fully aquatic and therefore are obligate water dwellers. Seals and sea-lions are semiaquatic; they spend the majority of their time in the water, but need to return to land for important activities such as mating, breeding and molting. In contrast, both otters and the polar bear are much less adapted to aquatic living. Their diet varies considerably as well: some may eat zooplankton; others may eat fish, squid, shellfish, and sea-grass; and a few may eat other mammals.

In a process of convergent evolution, marine mammals such as dolphins and whales redeveloped their body plan to parallel the streamlined fusiform body plan of pelagic fish. Front legs became flippers and back legs disappeared, a dorsal fin reappeared and the tail morphed into a powerful horizontal fluke. This body plan is an adaptation to being an active predator in a high drag environment. A parallel convergence occurred with the now extinct ichthyosaur.

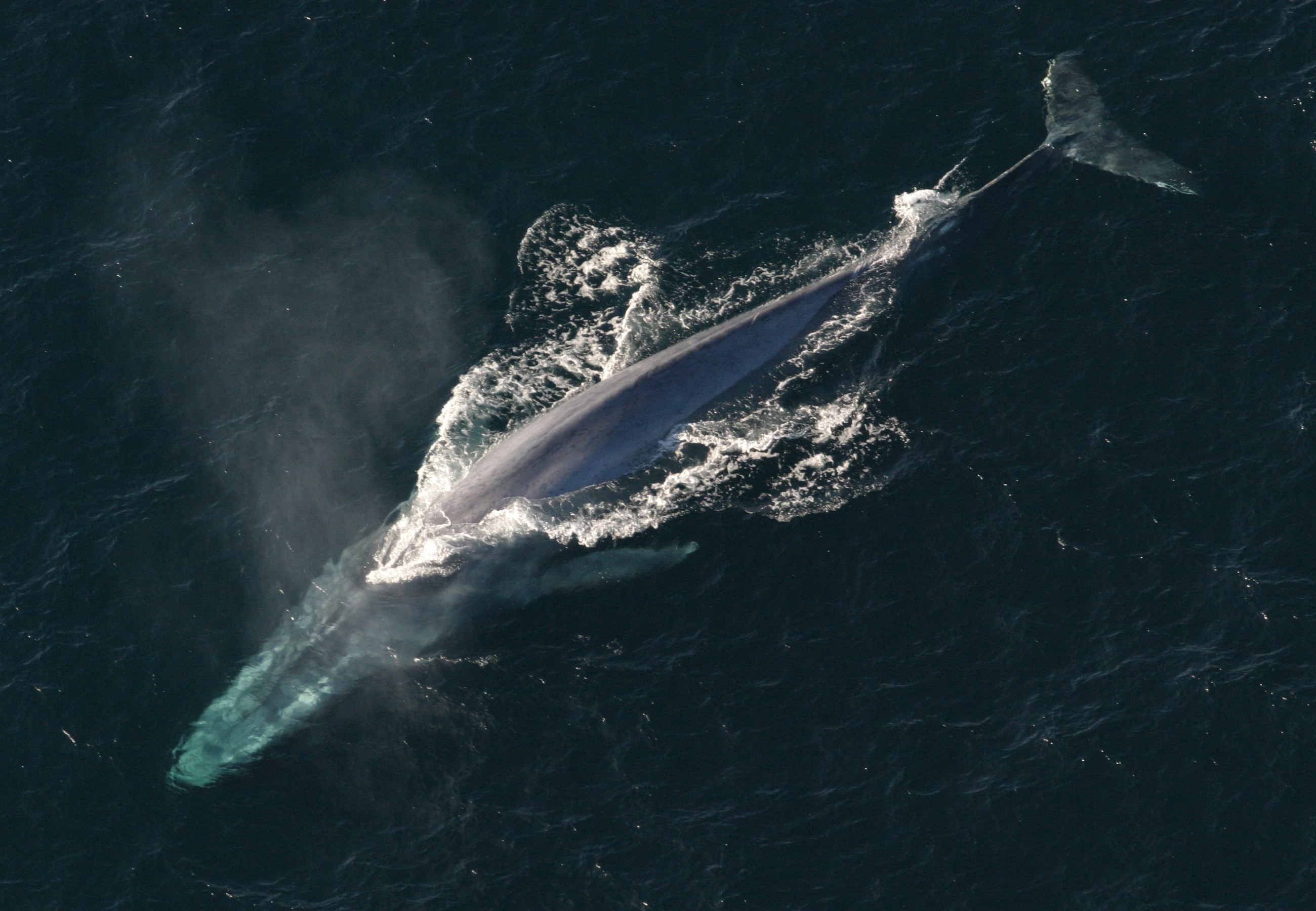
Endangered blue whale, largest animal ever

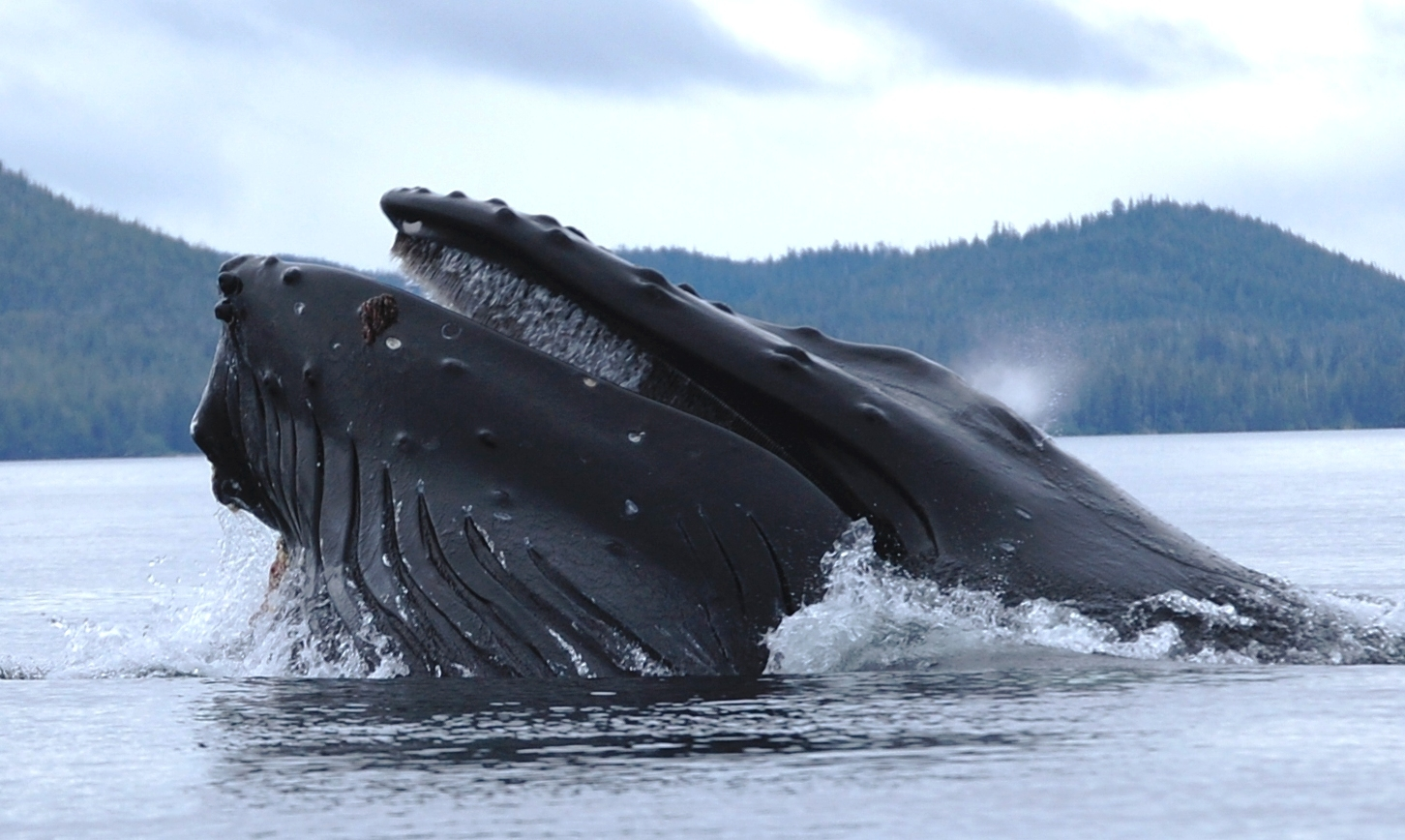
Humpback whale straining krill

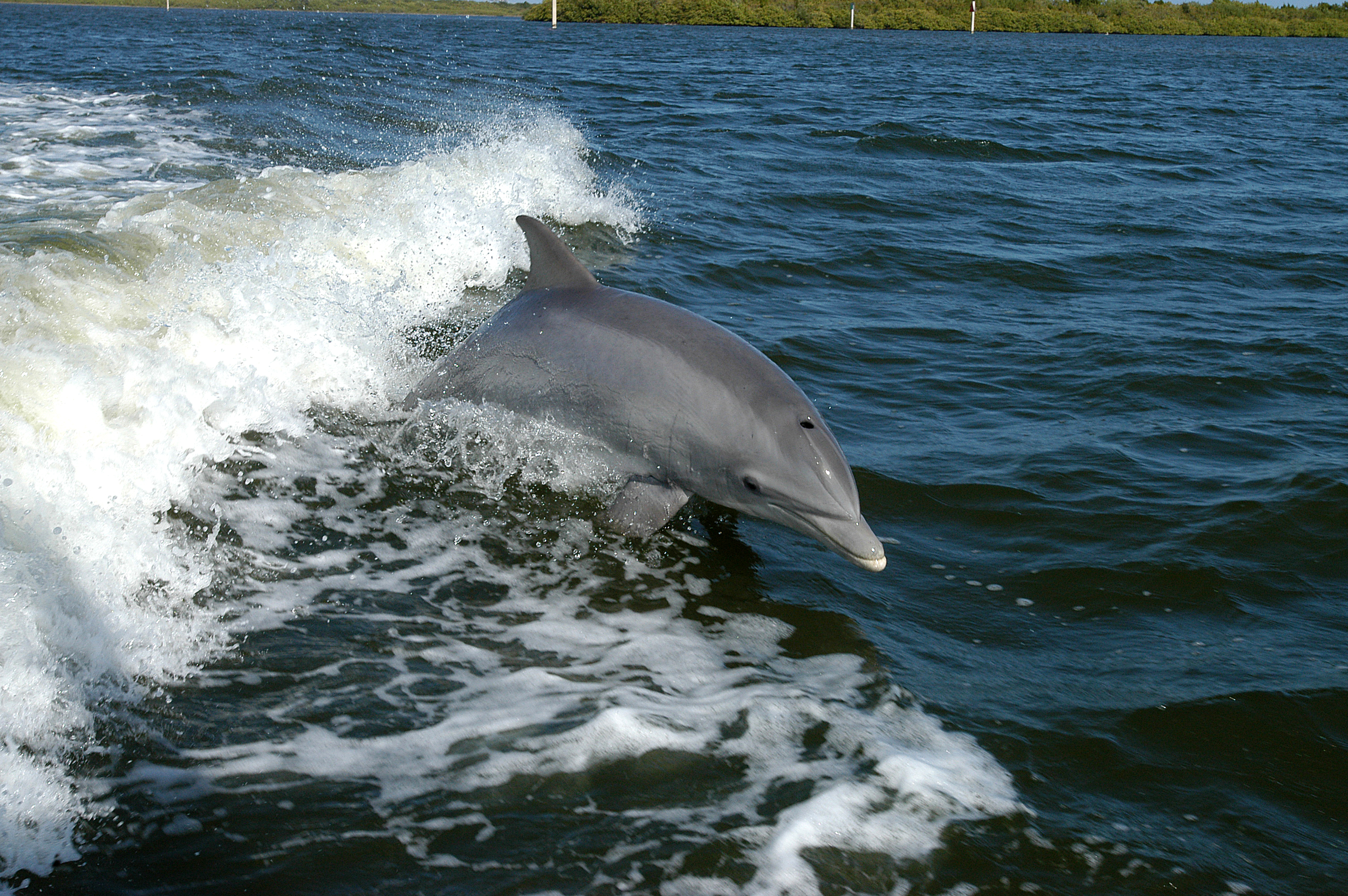
Bottlenose dolphin, highest encephalization of any animal after humans

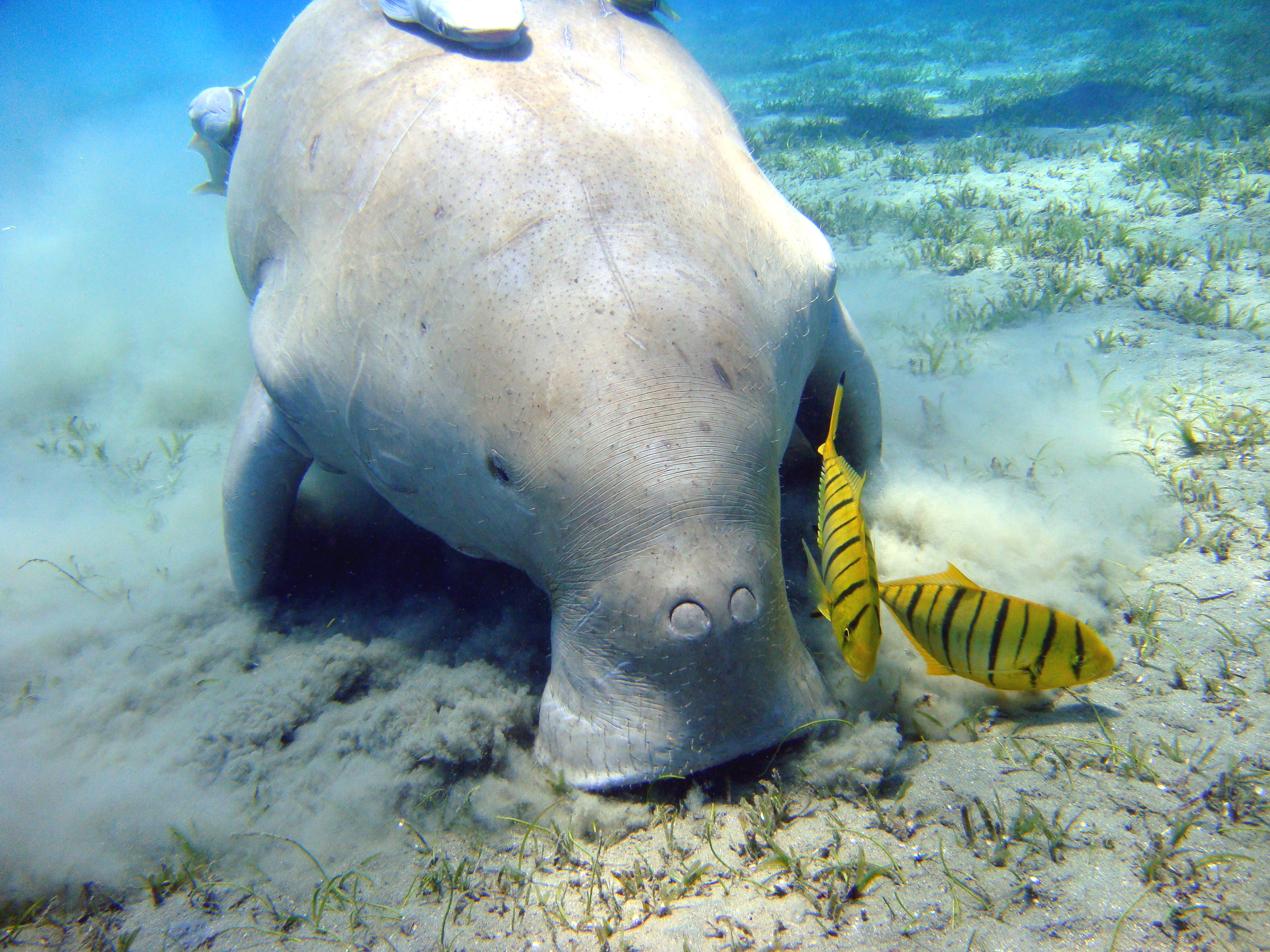
Dugong grazing on seagrass
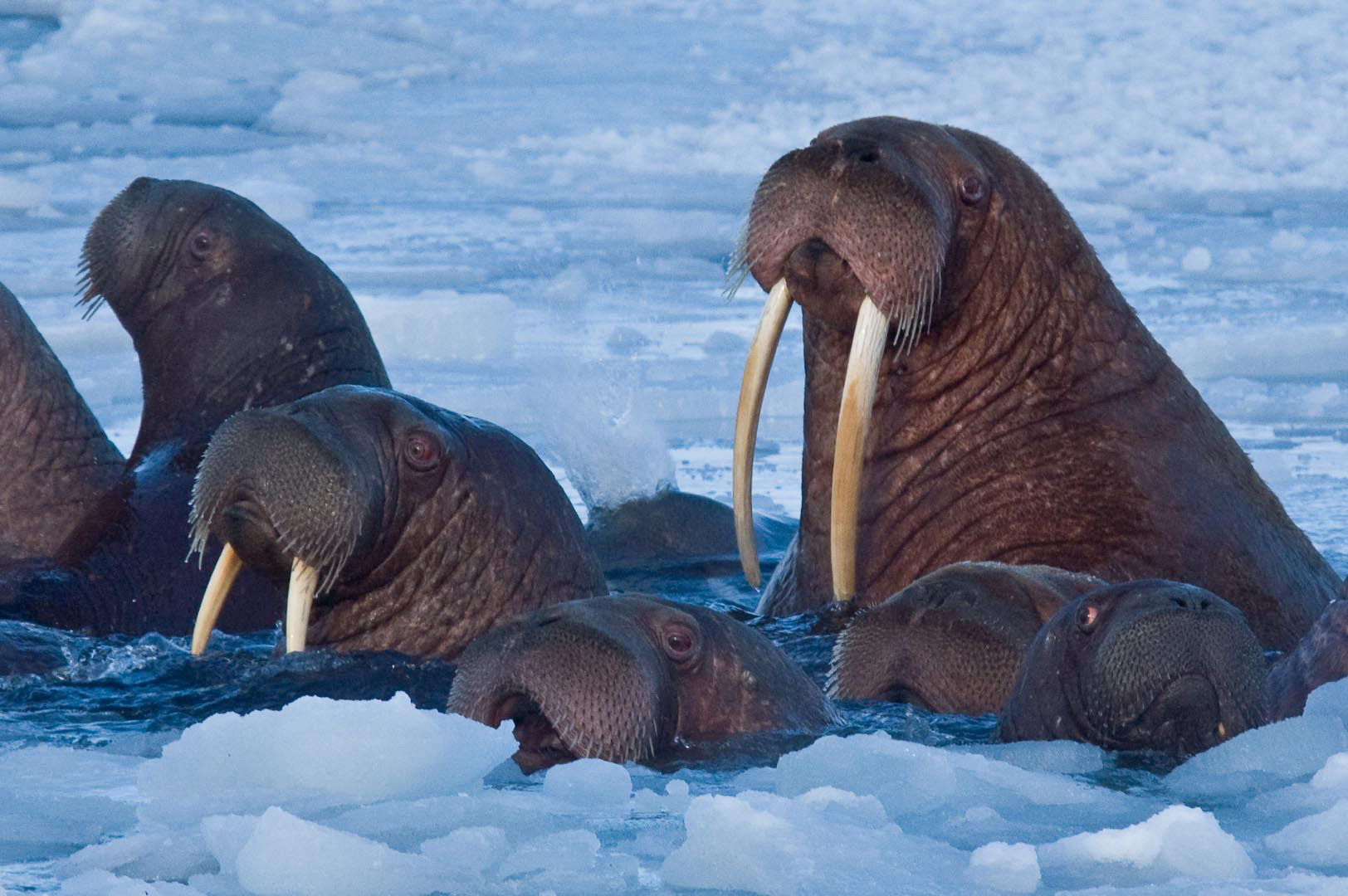
Walrus coming up for air

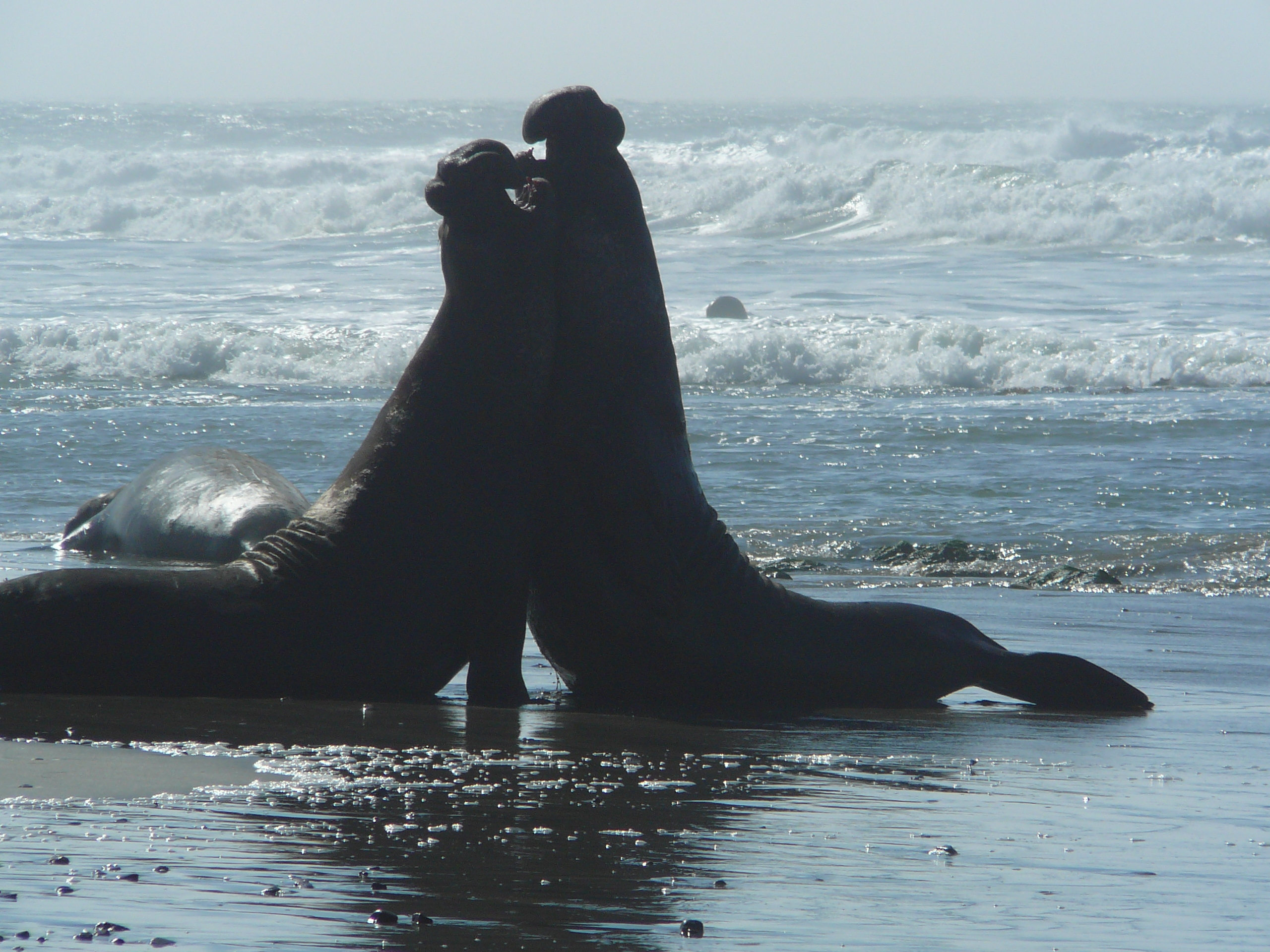
Battling sea elephants

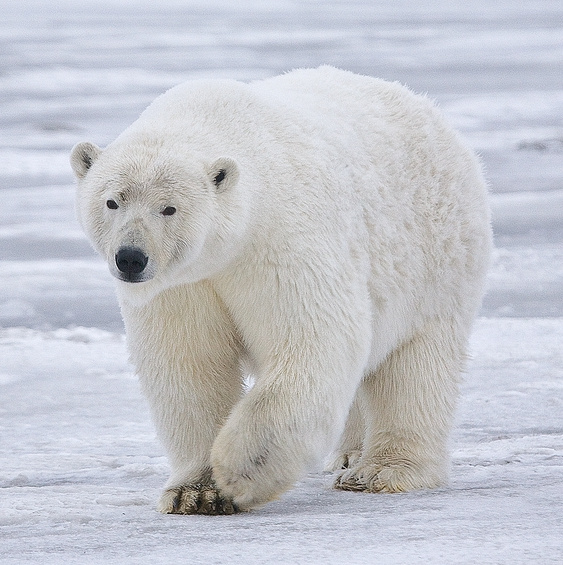
Polar bear

== See also ==
- Marine habitat
- Marine invertebrate
- Marine life
