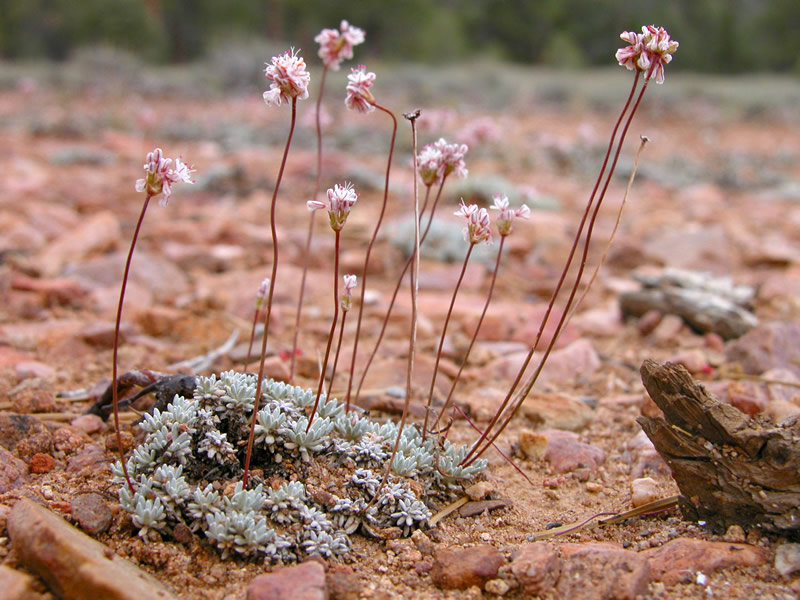
- var. austromontanum

Conservation status
- Apparently Secure (NatureServe)

Scientific classification
- Kingdom: Plantae
- Clade: Tracheophytes
- Clade: Angiosperms
- Clade: Eudicots
- Order: Caryophyllales
- Family: Polygonaceae
- Genus: Eriogonum
- Species: E. kennedyi

Binomial name
- Eriogonum kennedyi Porter ex S.Wats.

= Eriogonum kennedyi =

Species of wild buckwheat

Eriogonum kennedyi is a species of wild buckwheat known by the common name Kennedy's buckwheat.

== Description ==
E. kennedyi is a perennial herb forming a small cushiony mat covered in oval leaves up to about a centimeter long. The greenish leaves are coated in woolly fibers in shades of brown to pink or white. The inflorescence arises on an erect scape, or stem, bearing a head of small flowers which are white to pink with a darker midrib.

== Distribution ==
It is endemic to California, where it can be found in the Transverse Ranges, the Sierra Nevada foothills, and in the case of one variety, the high Sierra Nevada and far western Great Basin. It grows in dry habitat in sand or gravel.

== Species ==
There are five varieties of this species:

- E. k. var. alpigenum, the southern alpine buckwheat, grows in subalpine to alpine areas in the San Gabriel and San Bernardino Mountains, including San Gorgonio Mountain.
- E. k. var. austromontanum, the southern mountain buckwheat, grows in mountain habitat in the Transverse Ranges, including the pebble plain near Big Bear. It is a federally listed endangered subspecies.
- E. k. var. kennedyi is known from the eastern San Bernardino Mountains and from the Mount Pinos area
- E. k. var. pinocola, the Kern buckwheat, is known from only three occurrences in the mountains at the southernmost tip of the Sierra Nevada where it meets the Transverse Ranges near Tehachapi.
- E. k. var. purpusii can be found in several mountains and ranges in southern and eastern California.

Some varieties serve as foodplants for butterfly species such as Bauer's dotted blue (Euphilotes baueri) and Ord Mountain metalmark (Apodemia mormo dialeuca).
