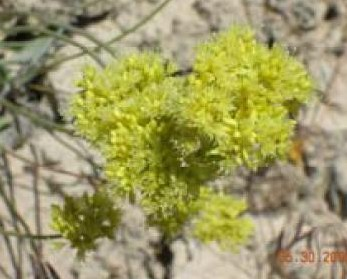

Scientific classification
- Kingdom: Plantae
- Clade: Tracheophytes
- Clade: Angiosperms
- Clade: Eudicots
- Order: Caryophyllales
- Family: Polygonaceae
- Genus: Eriogonum
- Species: E. ochrocephalum

Binomial name
- Eriogonum ochrocephalum S.Wats.

= Eriogonum ochrocephalum =

Species of wild buckwheat

Eriogonum ochrocephalum is a species of wild buckwheat known by the common name whitewoolly buckwheat. It is native to the Great Basin of the United States, where it grows in local habitat such as sagebrush. It is a perennial herb forming a thick clump or mat covered in clusters of woolly lance-shaped to oval leaves. The inflorescences arise on erect scapes and bear many tiny yellow flowers in a rounded cluster.
