= Arrhenia eburnea =

Scientific classification
- Kingdom: Fungi
- Division: Basidiomycota
- Class: Agaricomycetes
- Order: Agaricales
- Family: Hygrophoraceae
- Genus: Arrhenia
- Species: A. eburnea

Binomial name
- Arrhenia eburnea Barrasa & V.J.Rico (2003)

Species of fungus

Arrhenia eburnea is a species of agaric fungus in the family Hygrophoraceae. This tiny fungus, whose species epithet eburnea refers to its characteristic ivory colouration, produces pale yellowish, funnel-shaped caps measuring only 0.5–1.5 centimetres across with thick, widely spaced gills underneath and virtually no stipe, growing directly on moss in Mediterranean woodland environments. Found exclusively in the Iberian Peninsula, particularly in Spain and Portugal, it grows in the mild, humid conditions of Mediterranean evergreen oak forests during the cooler, wetter months from late autumn to early spring when moss growth is abundant.

== Taxonomy ==
Arrhenia eburnea is an agaric fungus in the family Hygrophoraceae that was described as new to science in 2003. The species name eburnea means "ivory-white", referring to its pale fruit body colours. It was discovered in the Mediterranean region and formally introduced by the mycologists José María Barrasa, Víctor Jiménez Rico, and Manuel Villarreal. Arrhenia eburnea belongs to a group formerly called "omphalinoid" Arrhenia, which are small, white, moss-associated mushrooms. It is closely related to species like Arrhenia acerosa, but distinguished by microscopic and molecular characters.

== Description ==
Arrhenia eburnea produces tiny, ivory to pale yellowish agarics. The cap is 0.5–1.5 cm across, convex to funnel-shaped, often with a wavy or lobed margin. It is whitish to cream-coloured, sometimes developing a slight beige tint centrally. The gills on the underside are thick, widely spaced and decurrent (running down the stub of a stipe). The stipe is very short or nearly absent, with the cap attaching directly to moss. The basidiomata are fibulate (having clamp connections on hyphae). A. eburnea is "omphalinoid", meaning it resembles a small Omphalina or Clitocybe. Under the microscope it has smooth, hyaline spores and tissue features typical of Arrhenia. Its basidia bear four spores and it lacks cystidia. Field identification relies on its pale colour, growth on moss, and the absence of bright pigments (unlike greenish Arrhenia chlorocyanea or grey A. lobata).

== Habitat and distribution ==
Arrhenia eburnea appears to be a Mediterranean endemic fungus. It was first collected in western Spain, in typical Mediterranean evergreen oak forest. The holotype was from Cáceres province, Spain, growing among mosses on soil under holm oak (Quercus ilex). Additional records have come from Portugal and southern Spain, also in mossy ground of open woodlands. It favours the mild, humid microclimate that develops in winter and early spring in Mediterranean forests. This species fruits during the cooler, wetter months (late fall to early spring) when moss growth is luxuriant. A. eburnea has not yet been reported outside the Iberian Peninsula.
