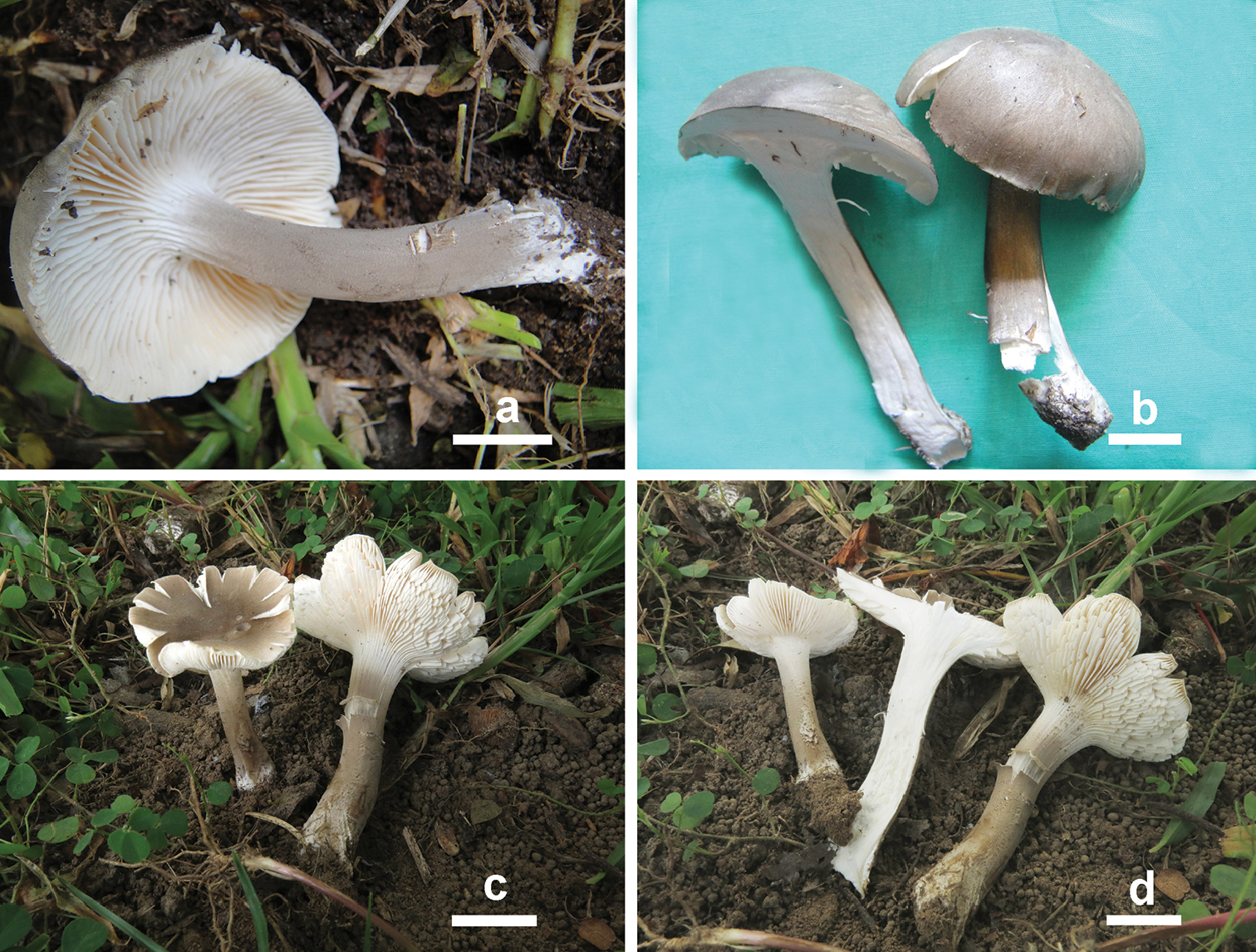

Scientific classification
- Kingdom: Fungi
- Division: Basidiomycota
- Class: Agaricomycetes
- Order: Agaricales
- Family: Hygrophoraceae
- Genus: Cantharocybe
- Species: C. virosa

Binomial name
- Cantharocybe virosa (Manim. & K.B. Vrinda) T.K.A. Kumar (2013)

Synonyms
- Megacollybia virosa

= Cantharocybe virosa =

Species of fungus

Cantharocybe virosa
- Mycological characteristics
- Gills on hymenium
- Cap is convex
- Hymenium is adnate or decurrent
- Stipe has a volva
- Spore print is white
- Ecology is mycorrhizal
- Edibility is inedible

Cantharocybe virosa is a member of the fungal family Hygrophoraceae that has been identified in India, Bangladesh and Thailand. It is an ectomycorrhizal fungus that is toxic for consumption and has no know uses in agriculture, horticulture or medicine. C. virosa is a gray to gray-brown fungus with white to yellowish-white gills that can be found in soil or on mud walls near Cocos nucifera.

== Taxonomy ==
The species Cantharocybe virosa was initially described by a group of mycologists at the University of Calicut as Megacollybia virosa in 2010 using a cladistic approach. It was transferred from the genus Megacollybia to the genus Cantharocybe in 2013 by Kumar and Manimohan using molecular phylogeny.

== Description ==
=== Macroscopic ===
Cantharocybe virosa has a gray to gray-brown pileus, ranging from 4.5 cm to 10 cm in diameter, with a striped surface and straight margins at maturity. The gills are up to 9mm thick and yellowish white to whitish, either adnate or decurrent, forming between four and eight tiers . The stipe is terete or compressed and typically central, but it can be excentric. It is moist, solid, with a dilated apex and white basal mycelium. The spore print is white, and the mushroom produces a strong and unpleasant, but undescribed odor.

=== Microscopic ===
Cantharocybe virosa has smooth ellipsoid basidiospores and elongated, necked lecythiform cheilocystidia . Also notable is the presence of cutis pileipellis forming trichodermal patches, and abundant clamp connections.

== Distribution and habitat ==
Cantharocybe virosa can be found both as solitary individuals or in clusters in a substrate of soil or mud walls. It is saprotrophic and often found near the roots of Cocos nucifera due to its ectomycorrhizal association with it. C. virosa inhabits tropical regions, originally identified in India in 2010, but has since been identified in Bangladesh as well as Thailand. C. virosa was identified in Bangladesh in 2016 and in Thailand in 2018. It is assumed to have been present in Thailand, but not described before this point due to the large number of unidentified fungi in the country.

== Root symbiosis ==
Cantharocybe virosa is believed to have an ectomycorrhizal association with C. nucifera, the coconut tree. This association is unusual as the family Arecaceae, in which C. nucifera is classified, typically doesn't form fungal associations. Recent studies have shown the closely related genus Cuphophyllus as having hyphal endophytes in plant roots, with Hosen hypothesizing the C. virosa and C. nucifera association might be of this form instead.

== Toxicity ==
When consumed, C. virosa causes gastrointestinal (GI) issues, a result of the mycotoxin coprine, but it is not fatal. Because it is not edible, it is not cultivated and has no know current or historical medicinal uses or known ties to any historical events. Wild specimens of C. virosa are occasionally mistaken for other mushrooms and ingested, leading to its description in India and identification in Thailand. The first known outbreak occurred in 2006 in Kerala when a family of four used it in cooking, but at this time C. virosa had not been described. In 2018 a large outbreak of 39 cases occurred during the rainy season in Thailand, found to be caused by C. virosa.

=== Coprine ===
The mycotoxin coprine is believed to be responsible for causing a number of symptoms when ingested, including GI system effects, rash, sweating and arrhythmias. These symptoms fall under the group 4b toxins, described as disulfiram-like.

== Use in research ==
In 2022 the genomic data gathered from C. virosa has been used as an out group to identify two new species in the genus Volvariella, V. neovolvacea and V. thailandensis.
