= Cora aturucoa =

Scientific classification
- Kingdom: Fungi
- Division: Basidiomycota
- Class: Agaricomycetes
- Order: Agaricales
- Family: Hygrophoraceae
- Genus: Cora
- Species: C. aturucoa

Binomial name
- Cora aturucoa Lücking, B.Moncada & C.Vargas (2016)

Species of lichen

Cora aturucoa is a species of basidiolichen in the family Hygrophoraceae. It was formally described as a new species in 2016 by Robert Lücking, Bibiana Moncada, and Carlos Alberto Vargas. The specific epithet aturucoa uses an acronym of the Asociación de Turismo Rural Comunitario Bogotá, Ciudad Bolívar, an organisation that manages the trail where the new lichen was found. Cora aturucoa is a saxicolous (rock-dwelling) lichen that grows in the high Andean forest zone of Colombia. Cora elephas is a closely related species.

== Taxonomy ==
Cora aturucoa is a basidiolichen in the family Hygrophoraceae (order Agaricales). It was described in 2016 by Robert Lücking, Bibiana Moncada, and Claudia Vargas from a high-Andean forest site south of Bogotá, Colombia. The epithet aturucoa honours the Asociación de Turismo Rural Comunitario Bogotá (ATURUCOA), a community-based ecotourism group that manages the Peña Blanca trail where the type specimen was collected. Molecular data from the internal transcribed spacer locus place C. aturucoa in the same clade as the rock-dwelling species C. elephas, but morphological differences—especially its undulate (wavy) lobes and large, marginally protruding hymenophore—support recognition as a distinct species.

== Description ==
The lichen forms a large, foliose (leafy) rosette up to 20 cm across on exposed boulders. It consists of five to ten semicircular lobes, each 3–6 cm wide and 2–4 cm long, that meet edge-to-edge or slightly overlap. Fresh lobes are dark green-grey to olive-green with faint concentric colour bands; the thin, rolled-in (involute) margins are whitish and finely pilose. When re-wetted, a weak reddish tint appears, most evident near the hymenophore. The upper surface is narrowly undulate when moist and shallowly undulate after drying, remaining glabrous except for the fringe of marginal hairs.

The lower surface lacks a protective cortex (ecorticate) and instead displays a whitish, felty-arachnoid medulla. In vertical section the thallus is 250–300 μm thick, with a viaduct-shaped upper cortex (20–40 μm) over a 50–70 μm zone of anticlinal hyphae, a 70–120 μm aeruginous-green photobiont layer, and a 100–130 μm medulla; clamp connections and papilliform hyphae are absent.

The fertile surface (hymenophore) is corticioid-cyphelloid, forming cream-coloured, resupinate patches 2–5 mm across that soon coalesce beneath the lobe edges, producing a conspicuous rim around the thallus. Sections 90–120 μm thick reveal abundant palisade-like basidioles (20–35 × 4–5 μm) and scattered four-spored basidia (25–35 × 4–5 μm); basidiospores remain undocumented. No secondary metabolites were detected by thin-layer chromatography, though the thallus exudes a reddish pigment when moistened.

== Habitat and distribution ==
As of its original publication, Cora aturucoa was known to occur only in its type locality along the Sendero Peña Blanca beside the Río Tunjuelo in the corregimiento of Pasquilla, Bogotá (roughly 2,850 m elevation). It grows on sun-exposed rock faces within high-Andean forest, often intermixed with other lichens such as Cladonia species. The broad, undulate lobes and protruding hymenophore may enhance moisture capture and rapid drainage on bare rock, while the reddish pigment released on wetting could mitigate intense ultraviolet radiation typical of this montane environment.
