= Alexander Zahlbruckner =

Austrian botanist and lichenologist (1860–1938)

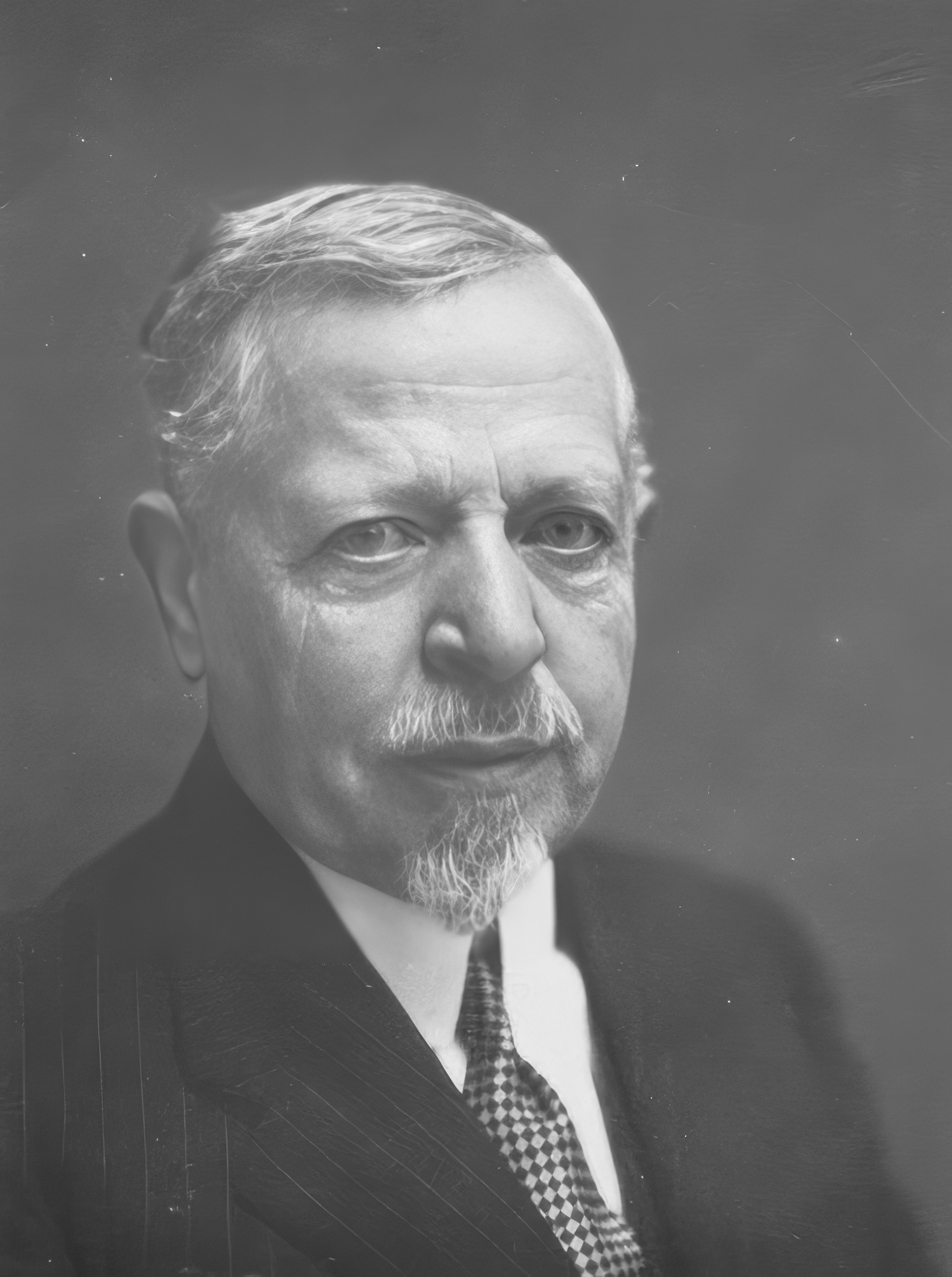
- Zahlbruckner in 1927
- Born: 31 May 1860; Svätý Jur
- Died: 8 May 1938 (aged 77); Vienna
- Education: University of Vienna
- Known for: Engler–Prantl classification of Lichenes; Catalogus lichenum universalis
- Scientific career
- Fields: Botany, Lichenology
- Workplaces: Natural History Museum, Vienna
- Author abbrev. (botany): Zahlbr.

Alexander Zahlbruckner (31 May 1860 – 8 May 1938) was an Austrian botanist and lichenologist who became one of the early 20th century's most influential lichen taxonomists. He spent his career at the Natural History Museum in Vienna, rising from volunteer to First Director (1918–1922). He became a leading authority through extensive fieldwork across the Austrian Alps and collaboration with European herbaria.

Zahlbruckner's most enduring contributions include his comprehensive classification system for lichens, published in Engler and Prantl's work Die Natürlichen Pflanzenfamilien (1903–1926). It organized lichen families primarily by fruiting body morphology and was widely adopted in handbooks across Europe. He also compiled Catalogus lichenum universalis (1921–1940), a ten-volume global catalogue of all known lichen species that imposed order on centuries of chaotic nomenclature and remains a standard reference for historical lichen literature.

His taxonomic work on Asian lichens, particularly his synthesis of Chinese species (1930) based on collections from Tibet and south-west China, introduced hundreds of new taxa and helped lay a foundation for regional lichenology. His annual literature reviews for Just's Botanischer Jahresbericht (1884–1931) and editorial work on specimen exchange series also helped coordinate the international lichen research community for nearly half a century.

== Early life and education ==
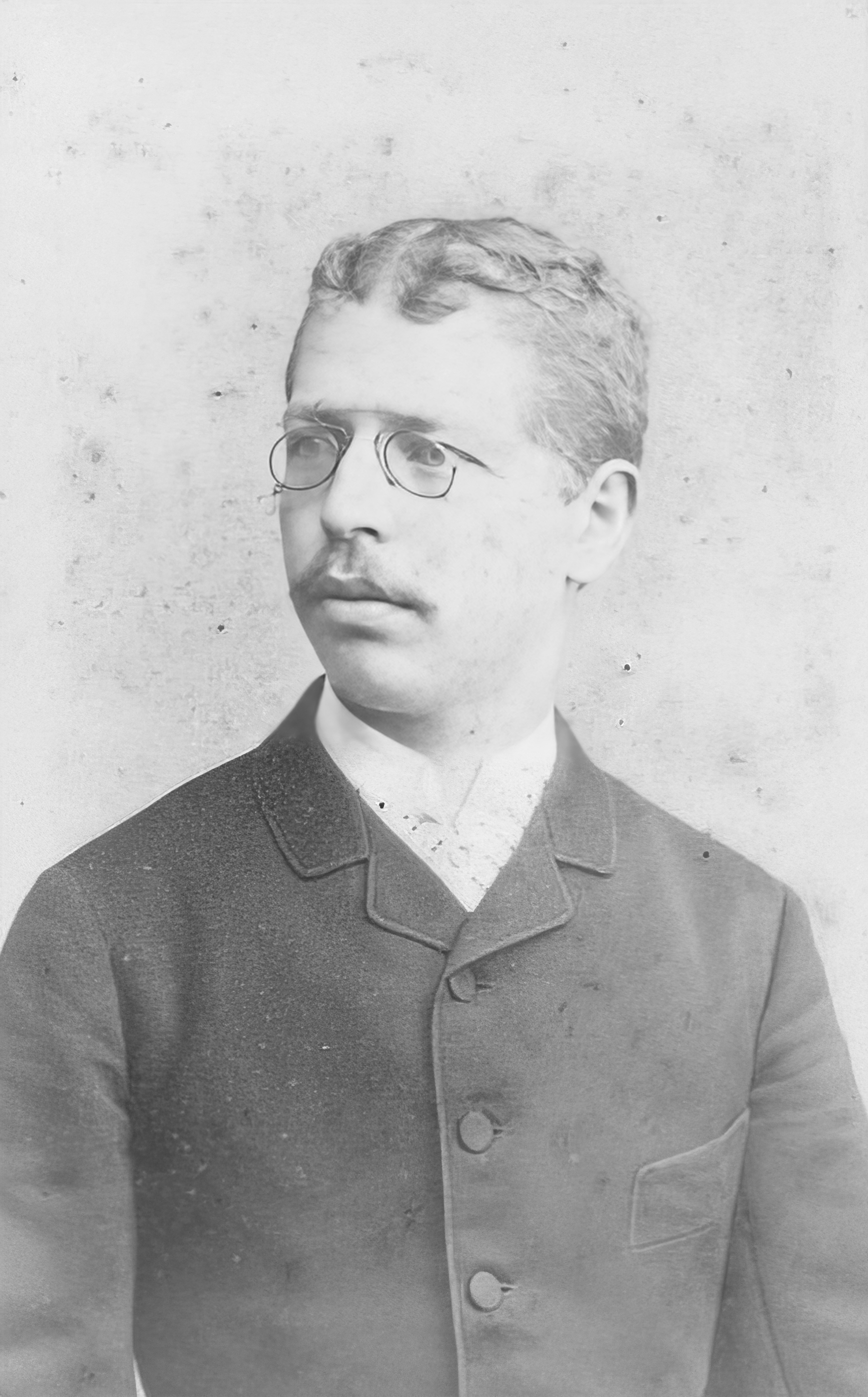
Alexander Zahlbruckner in 1890

From 1878 to 1883, Zahlbruckner studied at the University of Vienna, where his instructors included Anton Kerner von Marilaun and Julius Wiesner. His doctorate was formally conferred on 14 July 1883; his dissertation treated lenticels in plants. He was the grandson of the Austrian botanist Johann Baptist Zahlbruckner (1782–1850).

== Museum career and fieldwork ==
In the same year as his doctorate, he joined the department of botany at the Imperial Museum of Natural History in Vienna as a volunteer and became a scientific assistant in 1886. He advanced through a sequence of posts: assistant (1892), Custos-Adjunkt (assistant curator, 1896), provisional head of the botany section when G. Beck moved to Prague (1899), Custos 2. Klasse and confirmed head (December 1900), Custos 1. Klasse (1912); he was appointed First Director of the Natural History Museum in 1918, created Hofrat (an honorary civil-service title) in 1921, and retired in December 1922. Following the economic upheaval that followed the First World War, he was compelled to retire in 1922, though he continued working at the museum until May 1937. He died of cancer on 8 May 1938.

As a young scholar, he studied with leading authorities in Austria, Germany, France, and Switzerland and, until the First World War, spent most summers in the field. He based himself for many years at Schladming in the Styrian Alps, where he explored the surrounding dolomite valleys and volcanic peaks and built a reputation as an active field botanist. He made research visits to many European herbaria and institutes, including Geneva (the de Candolle, Boissier and Müller Argoviensis herbaria), Munich (where in 1908 he compared Krempelhuber's types with Wettstein's Brazilian lichen collections), and Berlin-Dahlem (attending the opening of the botanic garden and museum in 1910). Although he never travelled to Tibet or south-west China, Zahlbruckner took responsibility for the scientific study of the Tibetan and Hengduan Shan collections made by the Austrian explorers Heinrich Handel-Mazzetti, Joseph Rock, and Anton Gebauer. Some of his most influential later papers grew directly from these materials.

== Editorial work and exsiccatae ==
Early in his career, he published a first review of lichen literature in 1885. From 1886, he produced a stream of floristic papers, first on Lower Austria and later on Bosnia, Herzegovina and Styria, demonstrating his growing taxonomic expertise. Between 1884 and 1931, he produced 48 annual reviews of the lichenological literature for Just's Botanischer Jahresbericht. He also issued specimens in exsiccata series, including Kryptogamae exsiccatae and Lichenes rariores exsiccati, and spent his holidays collecting around his hometown of Svätý Jur, where he organized local excursions.

From 1896, he edited exsiccata series, among them Kryptogamae exsiccatae editae a Museo Palatino Vindobonensi, first together with Beck von Mannagetta und Lerchenau, and organized the exchange of specimens. He began issuing Lichenes rariores exsiccati in 1902 (already over 300 numbers by 1933). He edited the museum's Cryptogamae exsiccatae with G. Beck from 1884, then alone from 1899 to 1922.

== Classification work ==
Zahlbruckner's account presented Lichenes as a self-contained group and divided them into Ascolichenes (asco-lichens) and Hymenolichenes (basidiolichens). Within the Ascolichenes he organized families and genera principally by fruiting body form (perithecia, mazaedia, lirellae, or apothecia) and used photobiont identity an additional family-level criterion. The account appeared in Engler & Prantl's Die natürlichen Pflanzenfamilien (first edition, 1903–1907; revised second edition, 1926) and was widely adopted in handbooks. For the British flora, Annie Lorrain Smith revised and applied the system in her Monograph of British Lichens (British Museum, 1911–1926).

Later work using molecular phylogenetics (DNA-based "family tree" studies) has reshaped the classification of lichen-forming fungi. A widely used 2016 classification, presented as a reassessment "ninety years after Zahlbruckner", showed that many older groupings based mainly on the form of the fruiting bodies do not reflect close relationships. For example, Ostropales includes species with several different kinds of ascomata (fruiting bodies), and the traditional split between "ascohymenial" and "ascolocular" lichens is no longer used. The same study concluded that lichenization—the lichen lifestyle—evolved repeatedly, perhaps 20–30 times, across Ascomycota and Basidiomycota. Even so, Lecanorales and Lecanoromycetes remain the largest order and class of lichen-forming fungi. Although basidiolichens are relatively few, they help clarify broader evolutionary patterns. Overall, the DNA-based results show where Zahlbruckner's framework still matches natural lineages and where later evidence has redrawn the boundaries.

== Major works ==
=== Catalogus lichenum universalis ===
In 1916, aged 56, Zahlbruckner began assembling a global catalogue of all known lichens with their full bibliographic trail, a task that drew on his command of German, Slovak and Hungarian and his working knowledge of French, Latin and English. He finished the manuscript in 1918. The first instalment appeared in 1921 and he ultimately published nine volumes during his lifetime, with a tenth (supplement) issued posthumously in 1940. Contemporary colleagues praised the work for imposing order on a chaotic synonymy accumulated since the time of Hoffmann and Acharius. The catalogue's lasting value was affirmed by a mid-century reprint in 1951, and it remains a standard point of entry to the historical literature of lichen names. Printing of the Catalogus supplement began shortly before his death, and the parts appeared posthumously.

=== Regional syntheses and other publications ===
Zahlbruckner's synthesis "Lichenes. Übersicht über sämtliche bisher aus China bekannten Flechten" ('Lichens. Survey of all lichens hitherto known from China') (1930) is treated by later authors as a milestone in Chinese lichenology. It drew on roughly 1,050 specimens and included 281 new taxa. Most type material came from the greater Tibetan region of north Yunnan and south-west Sichuan: 252 new taxa from Handel-Mazzetti's c. 850 specimens, two from Rock's 21 specimens and one from Gebauer's 47 specimens; smaller series from H. Smith and G. Forrest were also used.

In Neue Flechten XI (1932) he described Thrombium cercosporum from the Aksai Chin Plateau near Surigh Yilganing Kol, and erected the new genus Chaudhuria (now Heterodermia sensu stricto) for C. indica from Darjeeling. A companion note in Repertorium two weeks later repeated the Thrombium protologue but named a different collector, reflecting conflicting expedition attributions in the source material.

Zahlbruckner made three substantial contributions on East Asian lichens that were widely cited in the regional literature for years after their publication: (1) Neue Flechten VIII (1916), which described new Japanese taxa from the collections of Yasuda and Urbain Jean Faurie; (2) Additamenta ad Lichenographiam Japoniae (1927), treating 206 species (Asahina's 164 plus Faurie's 42) and introducing about fifty new species or new varieties, with a Japanese summary by Asahina and two plates; and (3) Flechten der Insel Formosa (1933), based mainly on Asahina's specimens but also using material from Faurie, Masasuke Ogata and Shun-ichi Sasaki, covering 81 genera and 260 species, of which about 100 were newly described.

His Botanische Ergebnisse der Deutschen Zentralasien-Expedition 1927–1928 (1932 [1933]) listed a handful of Tibetan specimens gathered by Walter Bosshard and recorded Glypholecia tibetanica (Adolf Hugo Magnusson as author) as new.

A further paper, Nachträge zur Flechtenflora Chinas (1934), treated Rock's approximately 80 specimens from north Yunnan and south-west Sichuan and added 15 new taxa (13 species, 2 formae). Several of Rock's and Handel-Mazzetti's Tibetan collections were also distributed in Zahlbruckner's exsiccata (Lichenes rariores exsiccati and Kryptogamae exsiccatae), sometimes serving as isotypes. One name, Graphis rockii, was inadvertently issued twice in 1934 with identical protologues (journal and exsiccata). He also edited the second edition of Rabenhorst's Kryptogamen-Flora von Deutschland, Österreich und der Schweiz, recruiting leading European cryptogamic botanists to contribute.

Beyond lichens, he published on flowering plants, particularly from Bolivia, and cultivated a broad interest in the customs, archaeology and antiquities of the Austrian lands, especially Styria; his systematic studies of the Lobeliaceae were singled out at the time. By 1936, his output came to about one hundred papers, mostly systematic and floristic in scope. He also published regional works on lichen-forming fungi of central Africa, South America, China, Easter Island, Juan Fernández Islands, Dalmatia, Formosa, Japan, Java and Samoa.

== Legacy and character ==
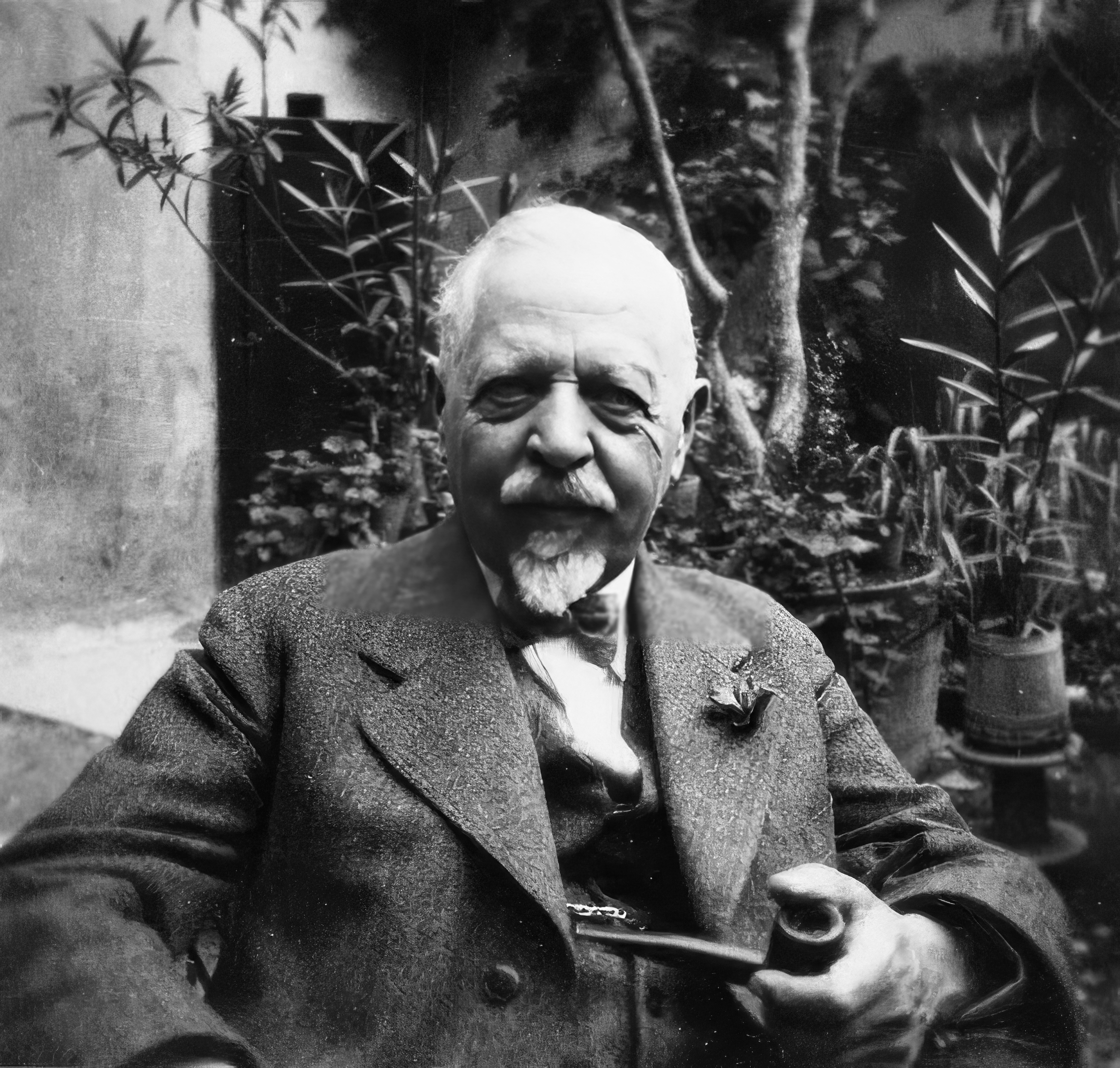
Zahlbruckner in 1936

Albert William Herre's obituary called Zahlbruckner the most eminent lichenologist since William Nylander—indeed, arguably the foremost since Erik Acharius—and credited the 1907 treatment in Die natürlichen Pflanzenfamilien with cementing his standing. He also noted that, before the First World War, Zahlbruckner maintained the finest private library of lichen literature then in existence; whether he could keep it complete in the straitened postwar years was doubtful. For practising lichenologists, Herre judged the Catalogus lichenum universalis indispensable because it gave a reliable foundation for the hardest part of systematics—synonymy. Later surveys explicitly treat his China/Tibet work as a "third milestone" beside the Catalogus and his Engler–Prantl classification, because it normalized the Chinese literature and type trail for hundreds of names used through the 20th century.

Zahlbruckner was fluent in multiple languages, which proved valuable in his international scholarly work. As Herre described it, he grew up "without a mother tongue": he spoke German with his father, Hungarian with his mother, and Moravian ("Nord Slavisch") with household staff; later he learned Latin, Greek and several modern languages at school. He never quite acquired an English accent, despite an excellent command of written English, and he enjoyed talking about English literature. Colleagues and students sought him out for guidance. Herre recalled that in 1903, when few American botanists would answer his queries, Zahlbruckner was the first to offer real encouragement and practical help. He expected seriousness of purpose—he had little patience for dilettantes—and his criticisms could be blunt, but they came from a deep command of the subject.

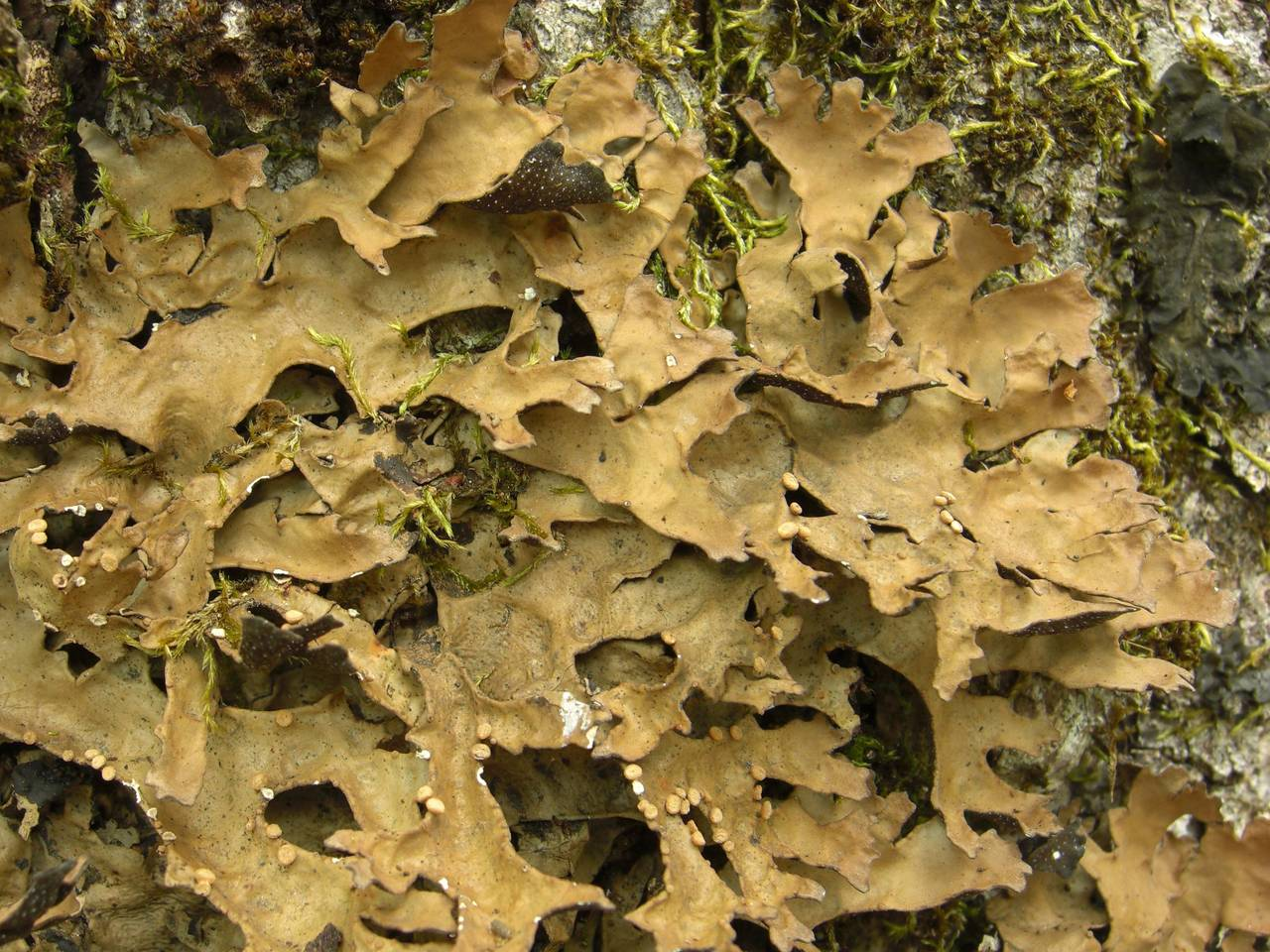
Pseudocyphellaria nudata is one the many New Zealand-based species first described by Zahlbruckner.

Although later molecular work has superseded parts of his morphology-based classification, his Catalogus remains an important bibliographic resource. In 1985, on the 125th anniversary of his birth, a memorial plaque was installed on his birth house in Svätý Jur. Some secondary sources have labelled him Czech; contemporary records and his own background described him as Austrian. He was from the then Austro-Hungarian town of St. Georgen (Svätý Jur), which had both German- and Slovak-speaking communities. A contemporary obituary described him as kindly and retiring, generous with his knowledge, and as having an apparently unlimited capacity for arduous scientific research and organization. The Linnean Society recorded his death as one of the most serious losses to lichenology. He was a prolific author of fungus species, having formally described nearly 1,700 of them in his career.

== Honours, service and memberships ==
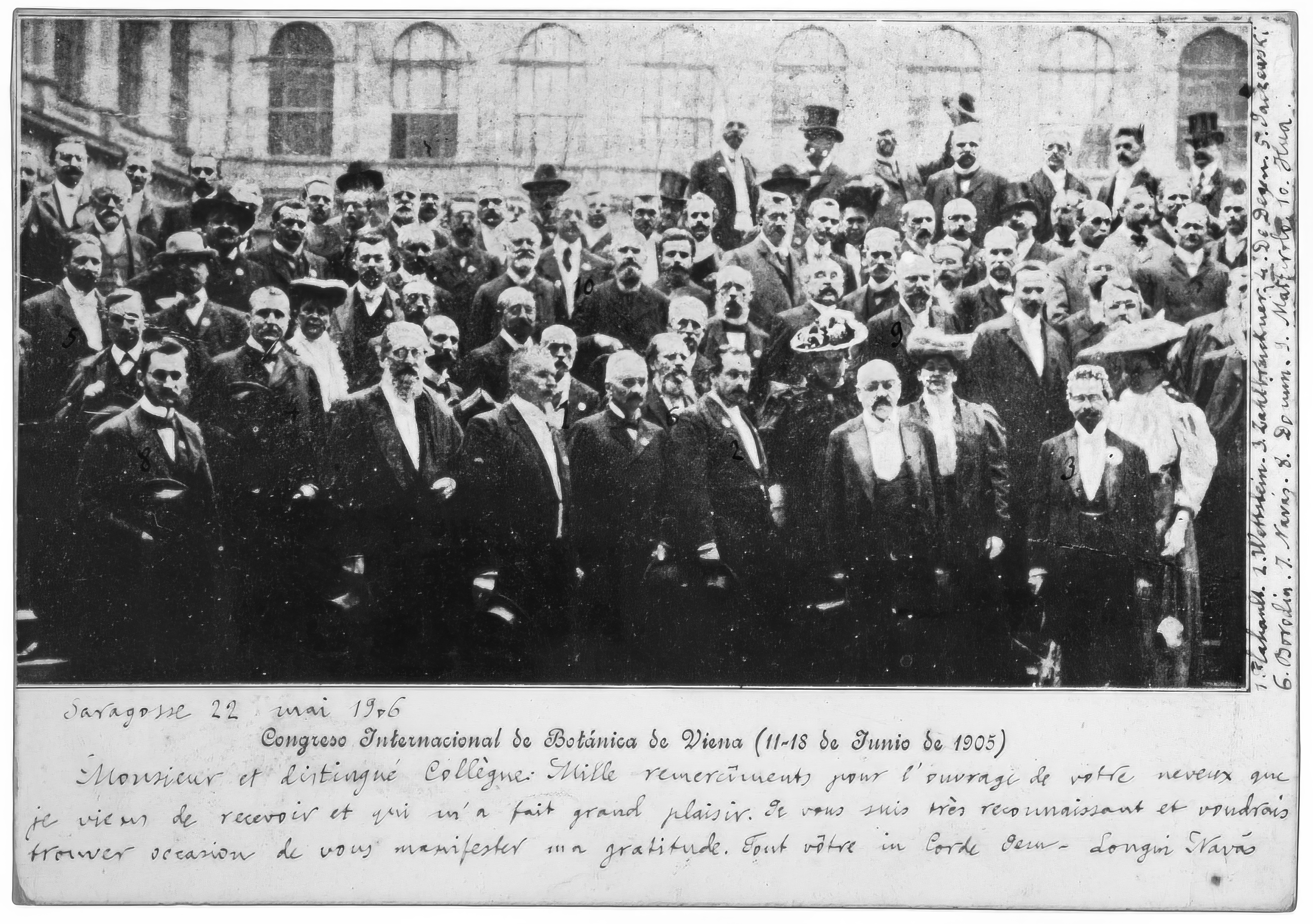
International Botanical Congress in Vienna (1905)

In 1905 he served as general secretary of the International Botanical Congress, held in Vienna. He was deeply involved in the Zoologisch-Botanische Gesellschaft in Wien: he was elected to the committee in 1892; in 1895 he took charge of the library, which he managed for many years; in 1897 he chaired the cryptogamic section, later served as vice-president, and in 1914 was made an honorary member. Elections and honours recorded at the time include the following: corresponding member, Société Nationale des Sciences Naturelles et Mathématiques de Cherbourg (1895); corresponding member, Torrey Botanical Club (1897); ordinary member, Royal Hungarian Academy of Sciences (1921); foreign member of the Linnean Society of London (1925); corresponding member, Société botanique de Genève (1925); and corresponding member, Botanical Society of America (1929).

== Eponymy ==
Several taxa have been named in Zahlbruckner's honour. These include the genera Zahlbrucknera Herre (1910), Zahlbrucknerella Herre, and the following species: Acarospora zahlbruckneri Samp. (1921); Arthothelium zahlbruckneri Makhija & Patw. (1995); Aspicilia zahlbruckneri C.W.Dodge (1971); Buellia zahlbruckneri J.Steiner (1909); Campylothelium zahlbruckneri Werner (1944); Catillaria zahlbruckneri Fink (1930); Claudopus zahlbruckneri Beck (1886); Corella zahlbruckneri Schiffn. (1909); Cyphelium zahlbruckneri Samp. (1924); Dermatocarpon zahlbruckneri Hasse (1913); Epichloë zahlbruckneriana Henn. (1900); Heppia zahlbruckneri Hasse (1911); Lecanactis zahlbruckneri Herre (1907); Lecanora zahlbruckneri Lynge (1913); Lecanora zahlbruckneriana Servít (1934); Lecidea zahlbruckneri Fink (1930); Leptosphaeria zahlbruckneri Strasser (1907); Lobaria zahlbruckneri Asahina (1933); Parmelia zahlbruckneri Lynge (1914); Parmelia zahlbruckneri Gyeln. (1927), nom. illeg.; Pertusaria zahlbruckneri Henn. & H.Magn. (1944); Pestalotia (Pestalozzia) zahlbruckneriana Henn. (1900); Pleogropappus zahlbruckneri Redinger; Phyllosticta zahlbruckneri Zahlbr. (1887); Riccia zahlbruckneri Frey; Sirococcus zahlbruckneri Bäumler (1902); Sticta zahlbruckneri de Lesd. (1914); Thelidium zahlbruckneri Servít (1953); Umbilicaria zahlbruckneri Frey (1936); Usnea zahlbruckneri Du Rietz (1926); Verrucaria zahlbruckneri Zschacke (1933); Winteria zahlbruckneri Bäumler (1893); Peltigera zahlbruckneri Gyeln. (1927) and Phaeographina zahlbruckneri Redinger (1934).

== See also ==
- Category:Taxa named by Alexander Zahlbruckner
