= Pseudoomphalina compressipes =

Scientific classification
- Domain: Eukaryota
- Kingdom: Fungi
- Division: Basidiomycota
- Class: Agaricomycetes
- Order: Agaricales
- Family: Tricholomataceae
- Genus: Pseudoomphalina
- Species: P. compressipes

Binomial name
- Pseudoomphalina compressipes (Peck) Singer, 1962

Species of fungus

Pseudoomphalina compressipes is a species of fungus belonging to the family Tricholomataceae.

Synonym:

- Agaricus compressipes Peck, 1883 (= basionym)
