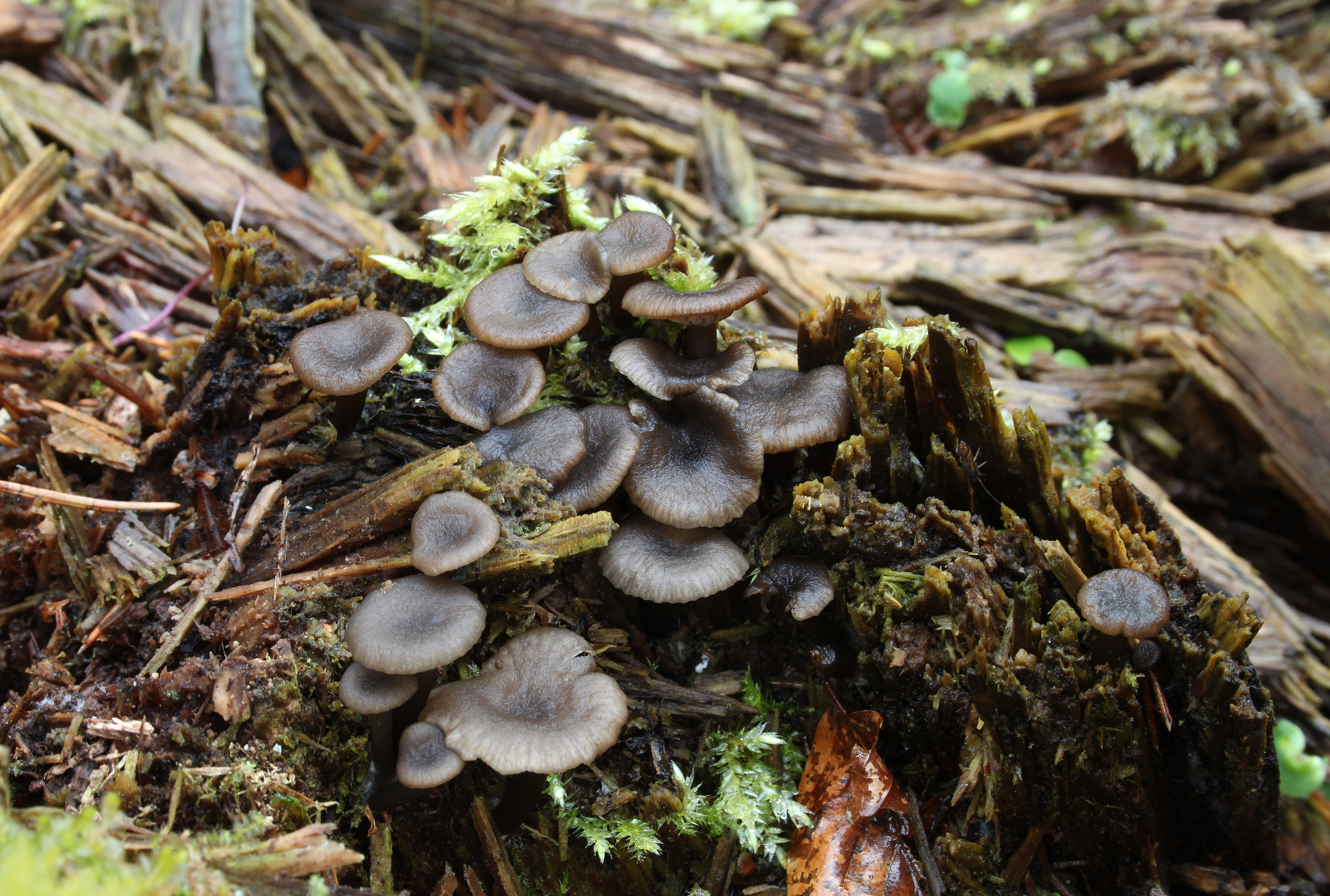

Scientific classification
- Domain: Eukaryota
- Kingdom: Fungi
- Division: Basidiomycota
- Class: Agaricomycetes
- Order: Agaricales
- Family: Hygrophoraceae
- Genus: Arrhenia
- Species: A. epichysium

Binomial name
- Arrhenia epichysium (Pers.) Redhead, Lutzoni, Moncalvo & Vilgalys 2002

Synonyms
- Agaricus epichysium Pers. (1794)

= Arrhenia epichysium =

Species of fungus

Arrhenia epichysium is a species of agaric fungus in the family Hygrophoraceae.

The fruit body has small brown to dark gray caps measuring 1–3 cm (1/2–1 1/4 in) in diameter. The cap color changes to light gray to tan when it is dry. The gills are narrow and thin, placed together closely, and decurrently attached to the stipe, which can be up to 5 cm (2 in) long. The flesh is grayish and watery. The spores are smooth and ellipsoid, measuring 6–7.5 μm. The spore print is white.

Outside of its genus, it can resemble the slightly larger Pseudoclitocybe cyathiformis.

It can be found on dead wood in North America (except for the Gulf Coast), lasting through May on the West Coast.
