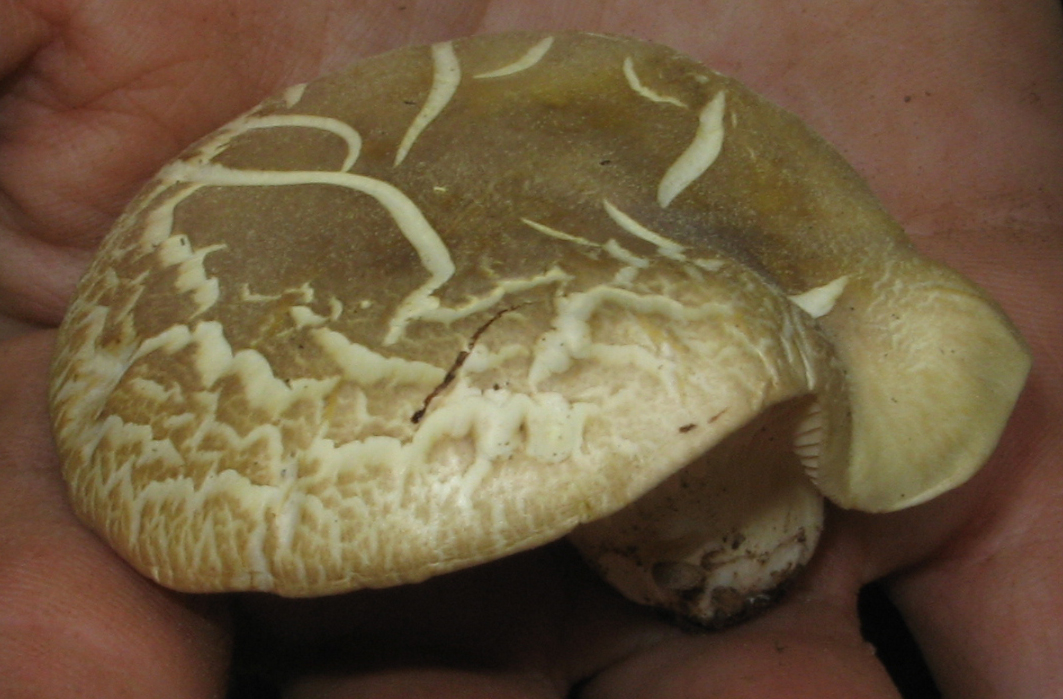
- Cantharocybe gruberi

Scientific classification
- Kingdom: Fungi
- Division: Basidiomycota
- Class: Agaricomycetes
- Order: Agaricales
- Family: Hygrophoraceae
- Genus: Cantharocybe; H.E.Bigelow & A.H.Sm. (1973)

Type species
- Cantharocybe gruberi (A.H.Sm.) H.E.Bigelow & A.H.Sm. (1973)

Species
- C. brunneovelutina C. gruberi C. virosa

= Cantharocybe =

Genus of fungi

Cantharocybe is a genus of mushroom-forming fungi in the family Hygrophoraceae. The genus was described by American mycologists Howard E. Bigelow and Alexander H. Smith in 1973. Cantharocybe contains three species: the type C. gruberi, and C. brunneovelutina from Belize, reported as new to science in 2011, and C. virosa, transferred from "Megacollybia", and found in Bangladesh and India.

== See also ==
- List of Agaricales genera
