= Aeruginospora singularis =

Scientific classification
- Kingdom: Fungi
- Division: Basidiomycota
- Class: Agaricomycetes
- Order: Agaricales
- Family: Hygrophoraceae
- Genus: Aeruginospora
- Species: A. singularis

Binomial name
- Aeruginospora singularis Höhn. (1908)

Synonyms
- Armillariella singularis (Höhn.) Singer (1951); Camarophyllus singularis (Höhn.) Singer (1973)

Species of fungus

Aeruginospora singularis is a species of fungus in the family Hygrophoraceae. The species, described by Franz Xaver Rudolf von Höhnel in 1908, is found in Indonesia. The type specimen of this species was found growing in soil under bamboo at the Bogor Botanical Gardens, and it has been found there twice since then.
