= Corella melvinii =

Scientific classification
- Kingdom: Fungi
- Division: Basidiomycota
- Class: Agaricomycetes
- Order: Agaricales
- Family: Hygrophoraceae
- Genus: Corella
- Species: C. melvinii

Binomial name
- Corella melvinii (Chaves, Lücking & L.Umaña) Lücking, Dal-Forno & Lawrey (2013)
- Holotype: Arenal Tempisque Conservation Area, Costa Rica

Synonyms
- Dictyonema melvinii Chaves, Lücking & L.Umaña (2004)

Species of lichen

Corella melvinii is a species of lichen in the family Hygrophoraceae. It forms thin, leaf-like mats that grow over mosses on tree bark in humid mountain rainforests. The lichen is found from Central America to South America, including locations in Costa Rica, Colombia, and Bolivia. Originally classified in a different genus, it was moved to Corella in 2013 based on genetic studies.

== Taxonomy ==
The species was first described in 2004 as Dictyonema melvinii from collections made in the Arenal Tempisque Conservation Area in Costa Rica, at elevations between 1,100 and 1,200 m (3,600 and 3,900 ft). The epithet honours Melvin Salas, a friend of the first author. A multi‑locus phylogeny published in 2013 showed that its fungus is positioned well outside Dictyonema in the strict sense (sensu stricto) and forms part of the Corella–Acantholichen lineage, so the name was recombined as Corella melvinii. As of 2022, the species has not been DNA‑barcoded, so its exact position within Corella remains to be tested.

== Description ==
The lichen thallus forms a thin, leaf-like (foliose) mat 5–10 cm across and about 200–300 μm thick. It grows over mosses that themselves cover tree bark. The thallus is divided into rounded to irregular lobes 5–12 mm wide; their edges curl strongly inwards. When dry the upper surface looks smooth and dark bluish- to greenish-grey, but under high magnification tiny dark speckles reveal clustered algal cells; rain deepens the colour to dark bluish green. The margin is pale grey to white. Underneath, the lichen lacks an outer skin (it is ecorticate) and instead shows a pale, felt-like layer of loose hyphae. No distinct prothallus (bordering fungal fuzz) is present. Tiny cylindrical outgrowths called isidia (vegetative propagules that help the lichen spread) are plentiful along the edges and scattered across the surface; they are 0.3–1.0 mm tall, often branched like coral, and match the thallus in colour and anatomy.

A cross-section reveals a thin upper cortex of irregularly arranged fungal cells, a patchy algal layer whose cyanobacterial partner is probably Scytonema, a dense white medulla packed with air spaces, and a loose, woolly lower layer of hyphae. No clamp connections were seen in the hyphae. Minute fruiting bodies (basidiocarps) occur on the thallus underside; they are round to irregular lobes 1–10 mm in diameter and 0.25–0.35 mm high, attached only loosely by the felty hyphae. Their spore-bearing surface is flat and pale beige to yellow-brown, with the margin rolled strongly inwards. Internally the basidiocarp has (i) a basal felty layer of colourless hyphae, (ii) a compact subhymenium containing air bubbles, and (iii) a 60–90 μm-high hymenium of tightly packed basidia and sterile cystidia; these tissues do not react with iodine (non-amyloid). Mature basidiospores were not observed.

== Habitat and distribution ==
Corella melvinii lives as an epiphyte, growing on the bark of trees or on mats of moss rather than on bare rock or soil, in humid montane rainforests from lower- to upper-elevation zones. Verified collections span Central to South America: the type locality in Costa Rica, a 3,000 m (9,800 ft) sub-Andean forest remnant in Chingaza National Natural Park (Cundinamarca Department, Colombia), and an evergreen ridge forest at 1,500 m (4,900 ft) on Cerro Asunta Pata in Bolivia's La Paz Department.

Specimens from Colombia and Bolivia are usually less developed, consisting mainly of thallus fragments with their characteristic isidioid propagules, yet share the same cortical anatomy as the Costa Rican material, confirming they belong to the same species.
