= Cantharocybe brunneovelutina =

Scientific classification
- Kingdom: Fungi
- Division: Basidiomycota
- Class: Agaricomycetes
- Order: Agaricales
- Family: Hygrophoraceae
- Genus: Cantharocybe
- Species: C. brunneovelutina

Binomial name
- Cantharocybe brunneovelutina Lodge, Ovrebo & Aime (2011)

Species of fungus

Cantharocybe brunneovelutina is a species of the family Hygrophoraceae.
