= Aeruginospora furfuracea =

Scientific classification
- Kingdom: Fungi
- Division: Basidiomycota
- Class: Agaricomycetes
- Order: Agaricales
- Family: Hygrophoraceae
- Genus: Aeruginospora
- Species: A. furfuracea

Binomial name
- Aeruginospora furfuracea E.Horak

Species of fungus

Aeruginospora furfuracea is a species of fungus in the family Hygrophoraceae. The species, described by Egon Horak in 1973, is found in New Zealand. It is currently placed in the genus Aeruginospora, but may actually belong in Camarophyllopsis.
