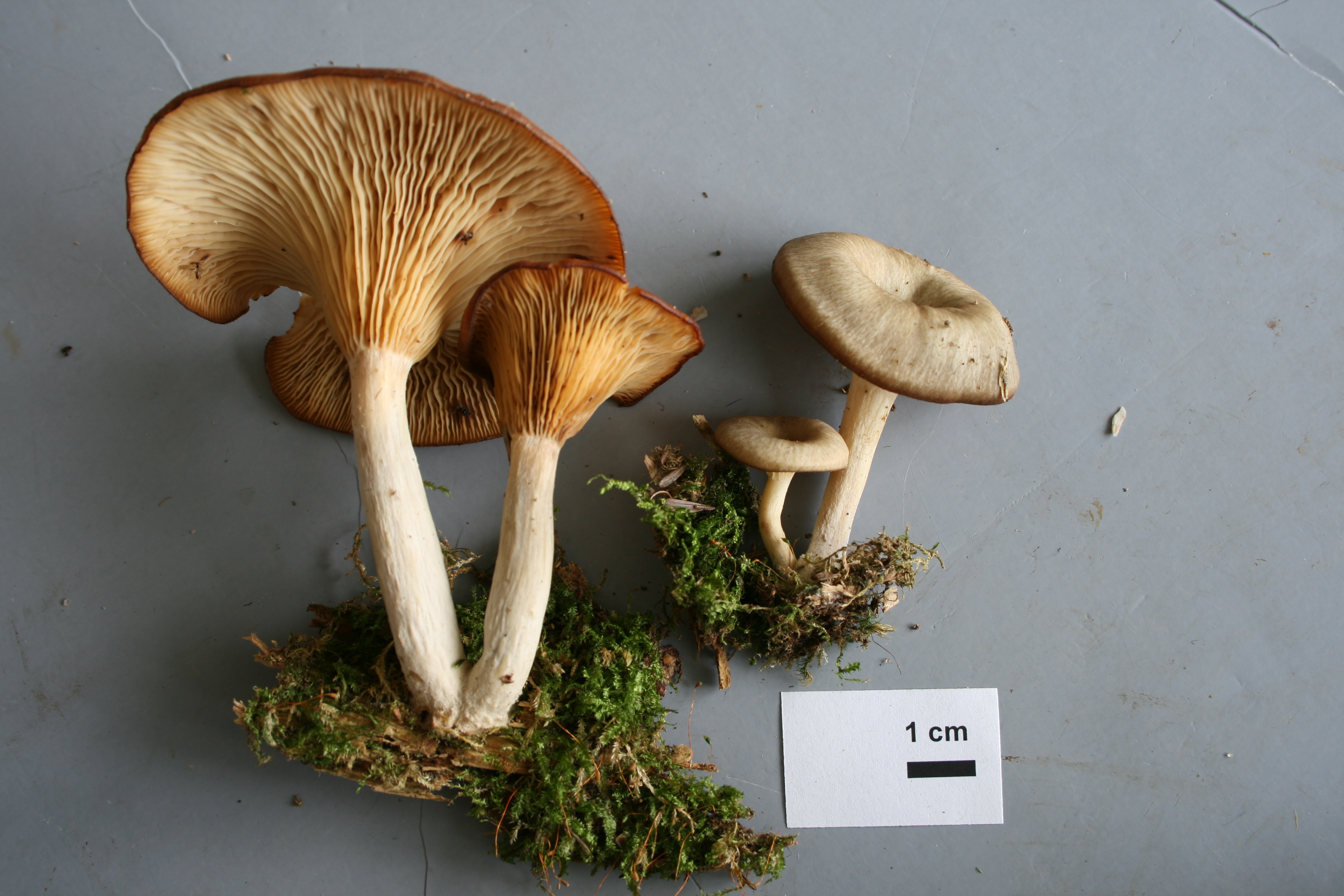
- Pseudoarmillariella ectypoides

Scientific classification
- Kingdom: Fungi
- Division: Basidiomycota
- Class: Agaricomycetes
- Order: Agaricales
- Family: Hygrophoraceae
- Genus: Pseudoarmillariella (Singer) Singer (1956)

Type species
- Pseudoarmillariella ectypoides (Peck) Singer (1956)

Species
- Pseudoarmillariella bacillaris Pseudoarmillariella ectypoides Pseudoarmillariella fistulosa

Synonyms
- Cantharellula subgen. Pseudoarmillariella Singer (1948)

= Pseudoarmillariella =

Genus of fungi

Pseudoarmillariella is a genus of fungi in the family Hygrophoraceae. The genus contains three species found in Central America, North America, and Asia. Pseudoarmillariella was described by mycologist Rolf Singer in 1956.
