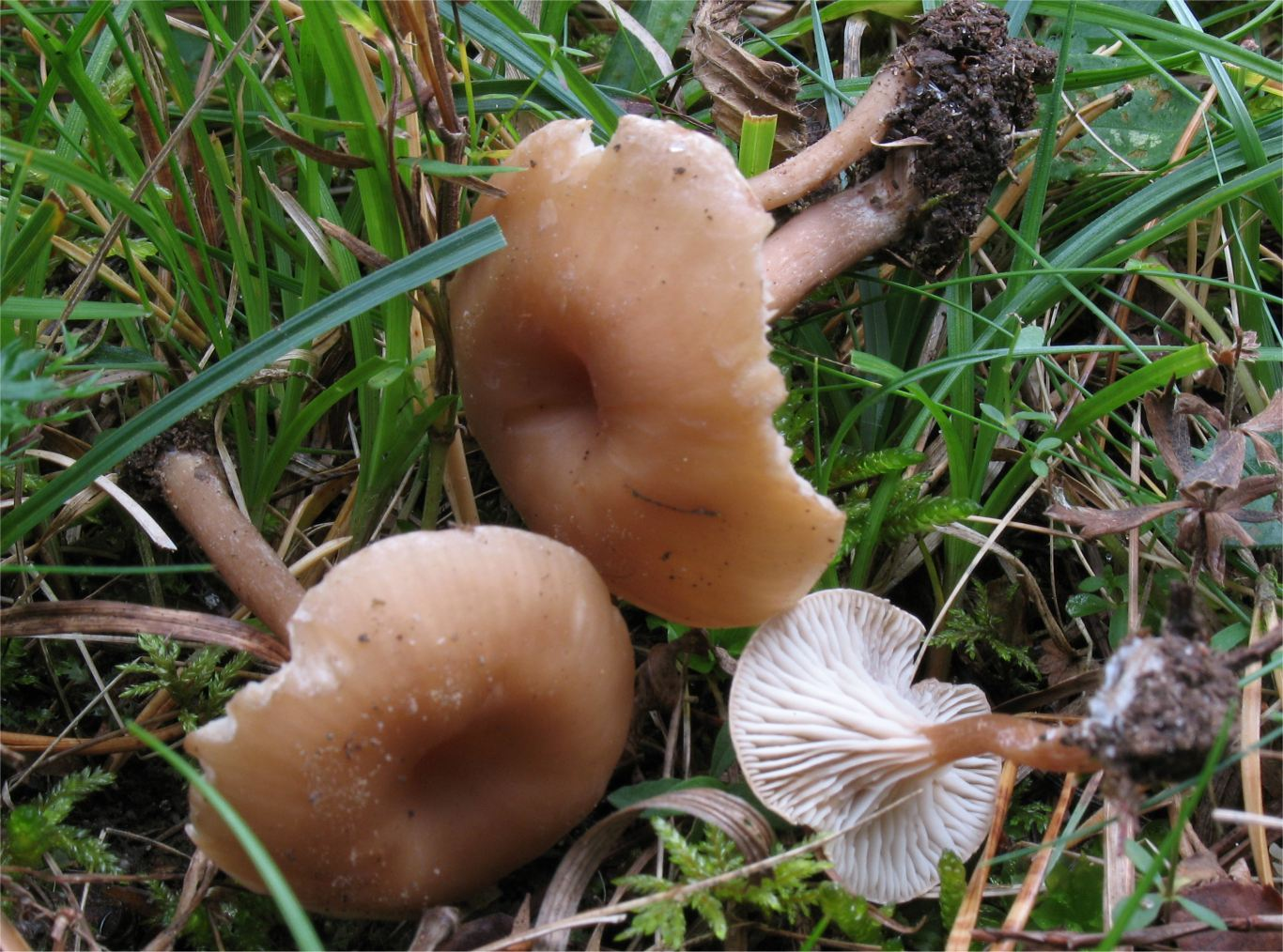

Scientific classification
- Domain: Eukaryota
- Kingdom: Fungi
- Division: Basidiomycota
- Class: Agaricomycetes
- Order: Agaricales
- Family: Tricholomataceae
- Genus: Pseudoomphalina
- Species: P. kalchbrenneri

Binomial name
- Pseudoomphalina kalchbrenneri (Bres.) Singer (1956)

Synonyms
- Omphalia kalchbrenneri Bres. (1881); Xeromphalina kalchbrenneri (Bres.) Singer (1942); Clitocybula kalchbrenneri (Bres.) Raithelh. (1979); Clitocybe kalchbrenneri (Bres.) Raithelh. (1980); Pseudoomphalina compressipes var. kalchbrenneri (Bres.) Gminder (2001)

= Pseudoomphalina kalchbrenneri =

Species of fungus

Pseudoomphalina kalchbrenneri is a species of fungus in the family Tricholomataceae, and the type species of the genus Pseudoomphalina. Originally described as Omphalia kalchbrenneri by Italian mycologist Giacomo Bresadola, the species was made the type species of the then newly created genus Pseudoomphalina by Rolf Singer in 1958. The fungus is found in North America and Europe.
