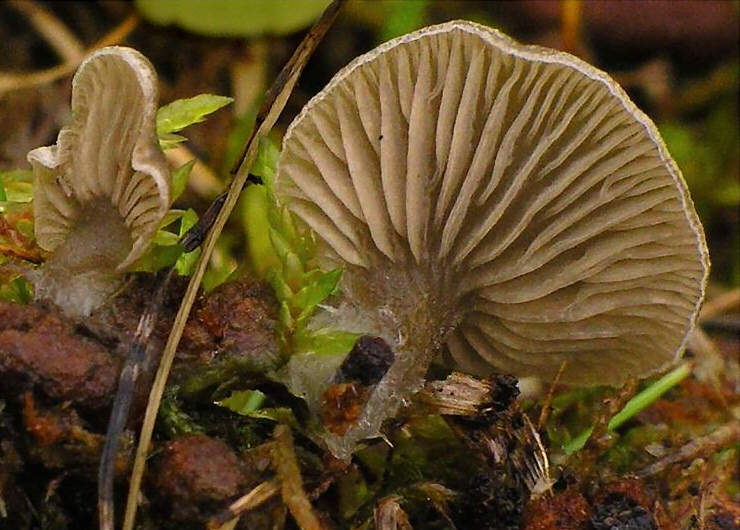

Scientific classification
- Kingdom: Fungi
- Division: Basidiomycota
- Class: Agaricomycetes
- Order: Agaricales
- Family: Hygrophoraceae
- Genus: Arrhenia
- Species: A. acerosa

Binomial name
- Arrhenia acerosa (Fr.) Kühner (1980)

= Arrhenia acerosa =

Species of mushroom-forming fungus

Arrhenia acerosa, commonly known as the moss oysterling, is a small agaric fungus in the family Hygrophoraceae. It produces fan‑shaped to kidney‑shaped fruit bodies directly on woody debris or bare soil along forest paths. Originally described in 1821, it occurs in Northern Europe and has been recorded from Sweden, Estonia and Norway.

== Taxonomy ==
The species was first named Agaricus acerosus by Elias Magnus Fries in 1821 and has since been shuffled through several genera—including Pleurotus, Dendrosarcus, Pleurotellus, Omphalina and Panellus—before Robert Kühner placed it in Arrhenia in 1980. Because Fries did not designate a holotype, Petersen and Knudsen (2020) selected a neotype from a 1943 collection made near Bokhultet in Småland, Sweden (Lundell & Nannfeldt exsiccata no. 1761), which matches Fries's original description in both habitat and morphology. Genetic data from the internal transcribed spacer (ITS) region group this Swedish neotype with specimens from Estonia and Norway, supporting a Northern European distribution and confirming its identity across collections.

== Description ==
Fruit bodies (basidiocarps) of Arrhenia acerosa are small and sessile (lacking a stipe, typically fan‑shaped to kidney‑shaped (reniform) and up to 15 mm across. The thin‑fleshed cap (pileus) is smooth and medium grey‑brown, with the margin incurved when young then straightening and becoming lobed; a white, fuzzy tomentum of hyphae (thread‑like fungal cells) marks the point of attachment to the substrate. The gills (lamellae) develop from the cap margin, are of normal spacing and shape (not forked), and are slightly darker than the cap surface.

Under the microscope, spores measure on average 7.4 by 3.8 μm (ranging from (5.8)6.8–8.7(9.7) by 3.4–3.9(4.4) μm), are narrowly elliptical to tear‑shaped (lacrymoid), smooth, transparent (hyaline) and bear a small apiculus (point of attachment). The spore‑bearing cells (basidia) are club‑shaped, four‑spored and measure 21–25 by 6–7 μm. No cystidia (specialised sterile cells) occur. The cap cuticle (pileipellis) is a cutis of radially orientated, cylindrical hyphae 3–10 μm wide, thin‑walled and yellow‑brown due to sparse incrustations of pigment. Clamp connections are present at the base of basidia and throughout all tissues, and pigment occurs both within cell membranes and as external incrustations.

== Habitat and distribution ==
Arrhenia acerosa grows on decaying wood fragments or directly on bare soil among twigs and wood chips along earthy forest paths. The neotype comes from a locality in Småland, Sweden, and additional specimens have been documented in Valga County, Estonia, and Vestfold County, Norway. Its occurrence on similar substrates and in comparable habitats across these regions suggests it is a characteristic element of Northern European woodland floor communities.
