= Cora elephas =

Scientific classification
- Kingdom: Fungi
- Division: Basidiomycota
- Class: Agaricomycetes
- Order: Agaricales
- Family: Hygrophoraceae
- Genus: Cora
- Species: C. elephas

Binomial name
- Cora elephas Lücking, B.Moncada & L.Y.Vargas (2016)

Species of lichen-forming fungus

Cora elephas, the elephant heart lichen, is a species of basidiolichen in the family Hygrophoraceae. It was formally described as a new species in 2016 by Robert Lücking, Bibiana Moncada, and Leidy Yasmín Vargas-Mendoza. The specific epithet elephas refers the "grey colour and elephant skin-like consistency" of the lichen. It occurs at elevations greater than 3,000 m (9,800 ft) in the northern Andes of Colombia and Ecuador, where it grows mostly on rocks, but sometimes with mosses and other lichens. Cora elephas is one of the largest species in genus Cora.
