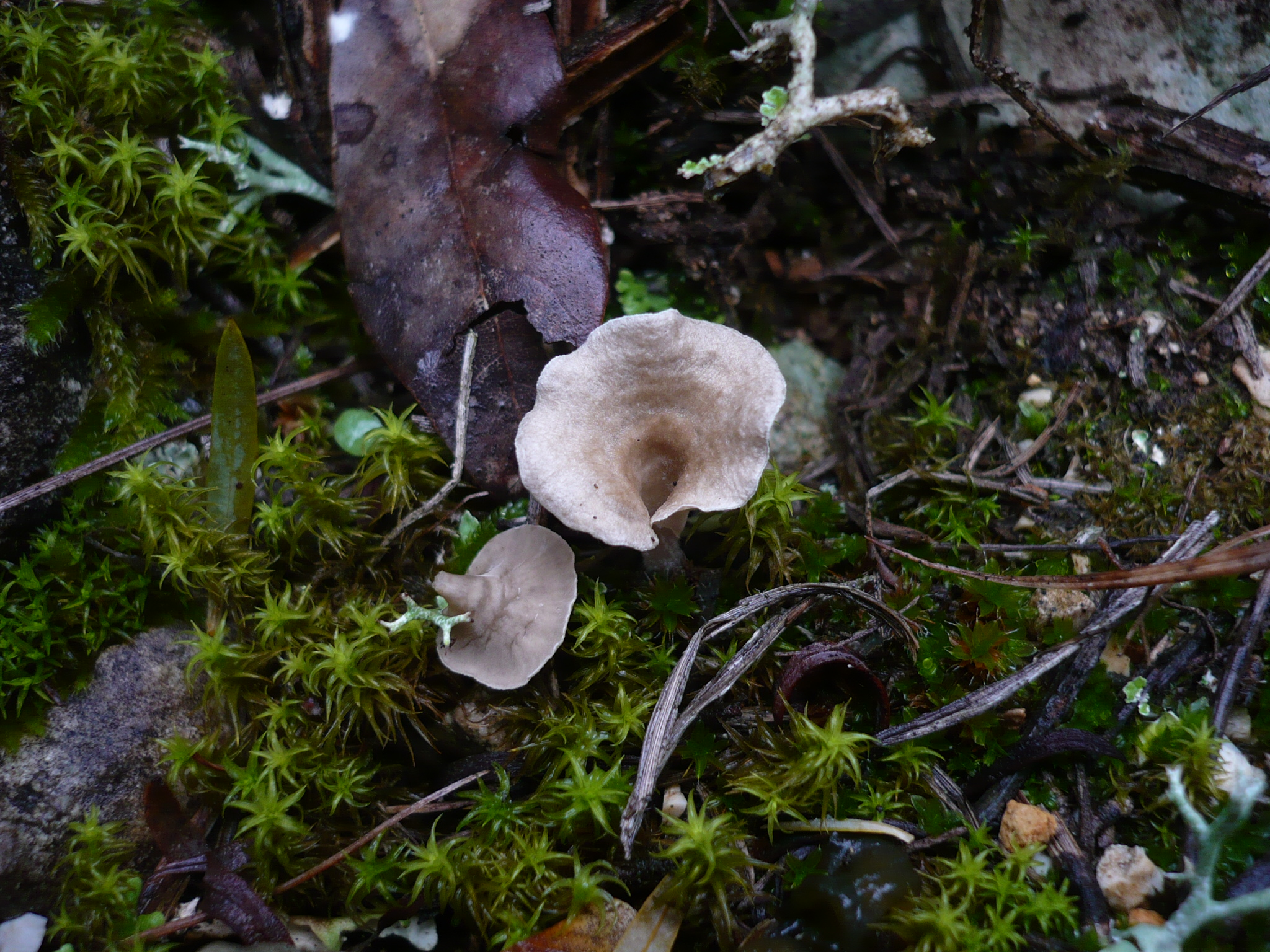

Scientific classification
- Domain: Eukaryota
- Kingdom: Fungi
- Division: Basidiomycota
- Class: Agaricomycetes
- Order: Agaricales
- Family: Hygrophoraceae
- Genus: Arrhenia
- Species: A. spathulata

Binomial name
- Arrhenia spathulata (Fr.) Redhead (1984)

Synonyms
- Cantharellus spathulatus Fr. (1828); Arrhenia muscigena (Bull.) Kühner & Lamoure (1972); Arrhenia muscigenum (Bull.) Honrubia & Folgado (1972); Arrhenia retiruga var. spathulata (Fr.) Gminder (2001)

= Arrhenia spathulata =

Species of fungus

Arrhenia spathulata Mycological characteristics
- Ridges on hymenium
- Cap is infundibuliform
- Hymenium is decurrent
- Stipe is bare or lacks a stipe
- Spore print is white
- Ecology is saprotrophic
- Edibility is inedible

Arrhenia spathulata is a mushroom-forming fungus in the family Hygrophoraceae. Found in Europe, it is widespread along the Atlantic coast.

== Description ==
Its cap is 5-20 mm and hygrophanous, becoming dark grey and translucently striped when wet, and paling to a grey-brown when dry. It is spatula or funnel shaped and its texture is smooth. The hymenophore has branched grey veins, that with age anastomose. They are adnexed to the stipe. The stipe is 2-3 x .5-1.5 mm. The flesh smells like geranium leaves.

The spore print is white. The spores measure 7-10 by 4-6.5 μm. and teardrop shaped. The basidia have 4 spores each and measure 28-34 x 7-10 μm. They have straight to curved sterigmata. Cheilocystidia are absent. Clamp connections are absent in all tissues.

== Ecology ==
Arrhenia spathulata grows on Tortula ruralis var. ruraliformis. It is common on coastal dunes in the Netherlands. It grows from October to January.
