= Corella brasiliensis =

Scientific classification
- Kingdom: Fungi
- Division: Basidiomycota
- Class: Agaricomycetes
- Order: Agaricales
- Family: Hygrophoraceae
- Genus: Corella
- Species: C. brasiliensis

Binomial name
- Corella brasiliensis Vain. (1890)

Synonyms
- Corella tomentosa Vain. (1899); Corella zahlbruckneri Schiffn. (1909)

Species of lichen

Corella brasiliensis is a species of basidiolichen in the family Hygrophoraceae. It was first described in 1890 by the Finnish scientist Edvard Vainio from specimens collected in the mountains of Brazil, where it was found growing on damp, soil-covered rocks. The species forms thin, olive-grey patches made up of small, overlapping scales that can merge into leaf-like structures, and it partners with blue-green bacteria to obtain nutrients. It is found in misty mountain forests from Costa Rica to Brazil, typically growing on shaded rocks and soil at the base of trees alongside mosses and other moisture-loving plants.

== Taxonomy ==
The Finnish lichenologist Edvard Vainio formally described the species in 1890 when he erected the genus Corella, basing both taxa on a sterile collection from soil‑covered rock at about 1,500 m elevation on the Serra do Caraça, Minas Gerais, Brazil. In the Latin protologue he distinguished the lichen by its squamulose (scaly) to minute‑foliose (leafy) thallus 15–30 mm across, lack of a true cortex, and photobiont filaments that he referred to Scytonema. A multilocus phylogeny published in 2013 confirmed that the fungus belongs to Corella rather than to the superficially similar genus Cora and synonymised the historical names C. tomentosa and C. zahlbruckneri with C. brasiliensis. High‑throughput DNA barcoding in 2022 produced multiple internal transcribed spacer (ITS) sequences for the taxon and showed that it sits in the same well‑supported clade as other Corella lineages, sister to Acantholichen within the subtribe Dictyonemateae.

== Description ==
The thallus of C. brasiliensis consists of irregular, overlapping squamules that can coalesce into thin foliose lobes, each lobe smooth, weakly concave and olive‑grey above but pallid to whitish beneath where a delicate hypothallus may be visible. Modern microscopy reveals a thin paraplectenchymatous cortex derived from the jigsaw‑shaped hyphal sheath that envelopes the cyanobacterial partner, contradicting Vainio's original view that the cortex is absent. Filaments of the photobiont Rhizonema interruptum are packed through most of the upper thallus and break into twisted cell clusters; the fungal sheath sends short tubular haustoria into the cyanobacteria, and colourless heterocysts (nitrogen-fixing structures) appear at regular intervals along the trichomes. The medulla, restricted to the lower margin, is a loose, cotton‑wool layer of thin‑walled hyphae only 3–4 μm thick, while true rhizines are absent and attachment to the substrate is by a broad, adpressed base.

== Habitat and distribution ==
Corella brasiliensis inhabits humid montane forests where persistent mist keeps soil and rock surfaces damp; the type locality is a rocky slope in the Serra do Caraça at 1,500 m, and additional verified records come from bryophyte‑rich ground and rock faces in similar cloud forest belts of Colombia and Costa Rica. Illumina dye sequencing of herbarium sheets up to 130 years old, combined with fresh collections, extended the species' confirmed range to all three countries and demonstrated that it accounts for the majority of Corella sequences recovered to date. Throughout this range the lichen typically forms thin, olive mats on shaded, soil‑splashed rocks or on consolidated soil at the bases of trunks, often in association with mosses and liverworts that help retain moisture.
