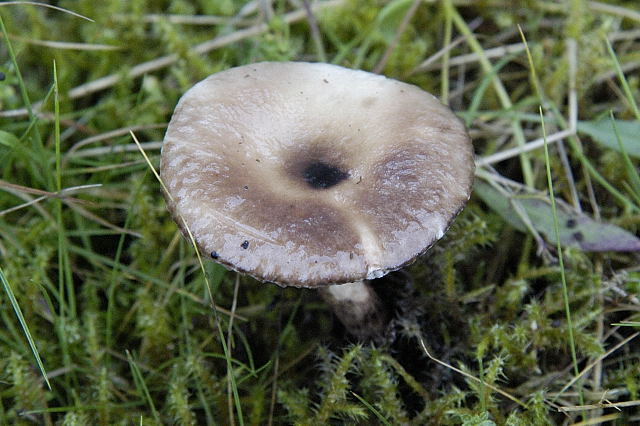
- Arrhenia (formerly Omphalina) griseopallida

Scientific classification
- Kingdom: Fungi
- Division: Basidiomycota
- Class: Agaricomycetes
- Order: Agaricales
- Family: Hygrophoraceae
- Genus: Arrhenia; Fr. (1849)

Type species
- Arrhenia auriscalpium (Fr.) Fr. (1849)

Synonyms
- Boehmia Raddi (1806); Corniola Gray (1821); Leptoglossum P.Karst. (1879); Leptotus P.Karst. (1879); Dictyolus Quél. (1886); Geotus Pilát & Svrček (1953)

= Arrhenia =

Genus of fungi

Arrhenia is a genus of fungi in the family Hygrophoraceae. Arrhenia also includes species formerly placed in the genera Leptoglossum and Phaeotellus and the lectotype species itself has an unusual growth form that would not normally be called agaricoid. All of the species grow in association with photosynthetic organisms such as mosses and the alga found on decaying wood and soil biocrusts. Typically the fruitbodies of Arrhenia species are grey to black or blackish brown, due to high concentrations of fungal melanin.

== Taxonomy ==
Arrhenia was named for the Swedish botanist Johan Peter Arrhenius.

=== Species ===
As of July 2026, the following species are recognised in the genus Arrhenia:

- Arrhenia acerosa (Fr.) Kühner
- Arrhenia alnetora (Singer) Redhead
- Arrhenia andina (Corner) Redhead, Lutzoni, Moncalvo & Vilgalys
- Arrhenia antarctica (Singer) Redhead, Lutzoni, Moncalvo & Vilgalys
- Arrhenia auriscalpium (Fr.) Fr.
- Arrhenia australis (Cleland) Grgur.
- Arrhenia baeospora (Singer) Redhead, Lutzoni, Moncalvo & Vilgalys
- Arrhenia baltica I. Saar & Voitk
- Arrhenia bigelowii Voitk, Lickey & I. Saar
- Arrhenia burzynskii Voitk & I. Saar
- Arrhenia chilensis (Mont.) Redhead, Lutzoni, Moncalvo & Vilgalys
- Arrhenia chlorocyanea (Pat.) Redhead, Lutzoni, Moncalvo & Vilgalys
- Arrhenia cupularis (Wahlenb.) Fr.
- Arrhenia cupuliformis Henn.
- Arrhenia cyathella (J. Favre & Schweers ex Kuyper) Elborne
- Arrhenia cystidiata Desjardin & B.A. Perry
- Arrhenia discorosea (Pilát) Zvyagina, A.V. Alexandrova & Bulyonk.
- Arrhenia eburnea Barrasa & V.J. Rico
- Arrhenia elegans (Pers.) Redhead, Lutzoni, Moncalvo & Vilgalys
- Arrhenia epichysium (Pers.) Redhead, Lutzoni, Moncalvo & Vilgalys
- Arrhenia favrei (Watling) P.-A. Moreau & Courtec.
- Arrhenia fenicola C.R.J. Hay & Thorn
- Arrhenia fennoscandiaca I. Saar & Voitk
- Arrhenia fissa (Leyss.) Redhead
- Arrhenia fusconigra (P.D. Orton) P.-A. Moreau & Courtec.
- Arrhenia gerardiana (Peck) Elborne
- Arrhenia glauca (Batsch) Bon & Courtec.
- Arrhenia griseopallida (Desm.) Watling
- Arrhenia hohensis (A.H. Sm.) Redhead, Lutzoni, Moncalvo & Vilgalys
- Arrhenia juncorum P.-A. Moreau & Corriol
- Arrhenia kuehneri Blanco-Dios
- Arrhenia latispora (J. Favre) Bon & Courtec.
- Arrhenia leucotricha P.-A. Moreau & Corriol
- Arrhenia lilacinicolor (Bon) P.-A. Moreau & Courtec.
- Arrhenia lobata (Pers.) Kühner & Lamoure ex Redhead
- Arrhenia lundellii (Pilát) Redhead, Lutzoni, Moncalvo & Vilgalys
- Arrhenia luteopallida (Kuyper & Hauskn.) Barrasa & V.J. Rico
- Arrhenia mohniensis Voitk, Burnzynski & I. Saar
- Arrhenia monsducalis Albanese, Battistin, Berna, Boragine, Ercole & Vizzini
- Arrhenia montana (Sacc.) Voitk & I. Saar
- Arrhenia obatra (J. Favre) Redhead, Lutzoni, Moncalvo & Vilgalys
- Arrhenia oblongispora Karich, Krisai & S.-Å.Hanson
- Arrhenia obscurata (D.A. Reid) Redhead, Lutzoni, Moncalvo & Vilgalys
- Arrhenia omnivora (Agerer) Redhead, Lutzoni, Moncalvo & Vilgalys
- Arrhenia onisca (Fr.) Redhead, Lutzoni, Moncalvo & Vilgalys
- Arrhenia parvivelutina (Clémençon & Irlet) Redhead, Lutzoni, Moncalvo & Vilgalys
- Arrhenia pauxilla (Clémençon) Redhead, Lutzoni, Moncalvo & Vilgalys
- Arrhenia peltigerina (Peck) Redhead, Lutzoni, Moncalvo & Vilgalys
- Arrhenia philonotis (Lasch) Redhead, Lutzoni, Moncalvo & Vilgalys
- Arrhenia polycephala (Bres.) E. Ludw.
- Arrhenia pontevedrana Blanco-Dios
- Arrhenia pubescentipes (H.E. Bigelow) Redhead, Lutzoni, Moncalvo & Vilgalys
- Arrhenia rainierensis (H.E. Bigelow) Redhead, Lutzoni, Moncalvo & Vilgalys
- Arrhenia retiruga (Bull.) Redhead
- Arrhenia rickenii (Hora) Watling
- Arrhenia rigidipes (Lamoure) Redhead, Lutzoni, Moncalvo & Vilgalys
- Arrhenia roseola (Quél.) Senn-Irlet
- Arrhenia rustica (Fr.) Redhead, Lutzoni, Moncalvo & Vilgalys
- Arrhenia salina (Høil.) Bon & Courtec.
- Arrhenia schistidicola Øvstedal & L. Lindblom
- Arrhenia settii Consiglio
- Arrhenia similis Gulden et al.
- Arrhenia spathulata (Fr.) Redhead
- Arrhenia sphaerospora (Lamoure) Redhead, Lutzoni, Moncalvo & Vilgalys
- Arrhenia sphagnicola (Berk.) Redhead, Lutzoni, Moncalvo & Vilgalys
- Arrhenia stercoraria (Barrasa, Esteve-Rav. & Sánchez Nieto) Redhead, Lutzoni, Moncalvo & Vilgalys
- Arrhenia subandina (Singer) P.M. Kirk & Redhead
- Arrhenia subglobisemen Corriol
- Arrhenia subglobispora (G. Moreno, Heykoop & E. Horak) Redhead, Lutzoni, Moncalvo & Vilgalys
- Arrhenia subobscura (Singer) Redhead, Lutzoni, Moncalvo & Vilgalys
- Arrhenia svalbardensis Gulden, I. Saar & Lücking
- Arrhenia tabaresiana (Vila & Llimona) Vila
- Arrhenia talpoides Voitk et al.
- Arrhenia telmatiaea (Berk. & Cooke) Voitk & I. Saar
- Arrhenia tillii (Krisai & Noordel.) Krisai & I. Saar
- Arrhenia tremulum (Schaeff.) Singer
- Arrhenia trigonospora (Lamoure) Redhead, Lutzoni, Moncalvo & Vilgalys
- Arrhenia umbratilis (Fr.) Redhead, Lutzoni, Moncalvo & Vilgalys
- Arrhenia velutipes (P.D. Orton) Redhead, Lutzoni, Moncalvo & Vilgalys
- Arrhenia violaceoviridis (Courtec.) Courtec.
- Arrhenia viridimammata (Pilát) Redhead, Lutzoni, Moncalvo & Vilgalys
- Arrhenia volkertii (Murrill) Redhead, Lutzoni, Moncalvo & Vilgalys
