= Hygroaster =

Scientific classification
- Kingdom: Fungi
- Division: Basidiomycota
- Class: Agaricomycetes
- Order: Agaricales
- Family: Hygrophoraceae
- Genus: Hygroaster; Singer (1955)

Type species
- Hygroaster nodulisporus (Dennis) Singer (1955)

Species
- H. agumbensis H. albellus H. cleefii H. iguazuensis H. lacteus H. nodulisporus H. trachysporus

Genus of fungi

Hygroaster is a genus of mushroom-forming fungi in the family Hygrophoraceae. The genus was described by mycologist Rolf Singer in 1955.

== See also ==
- List of Agaricales genera
