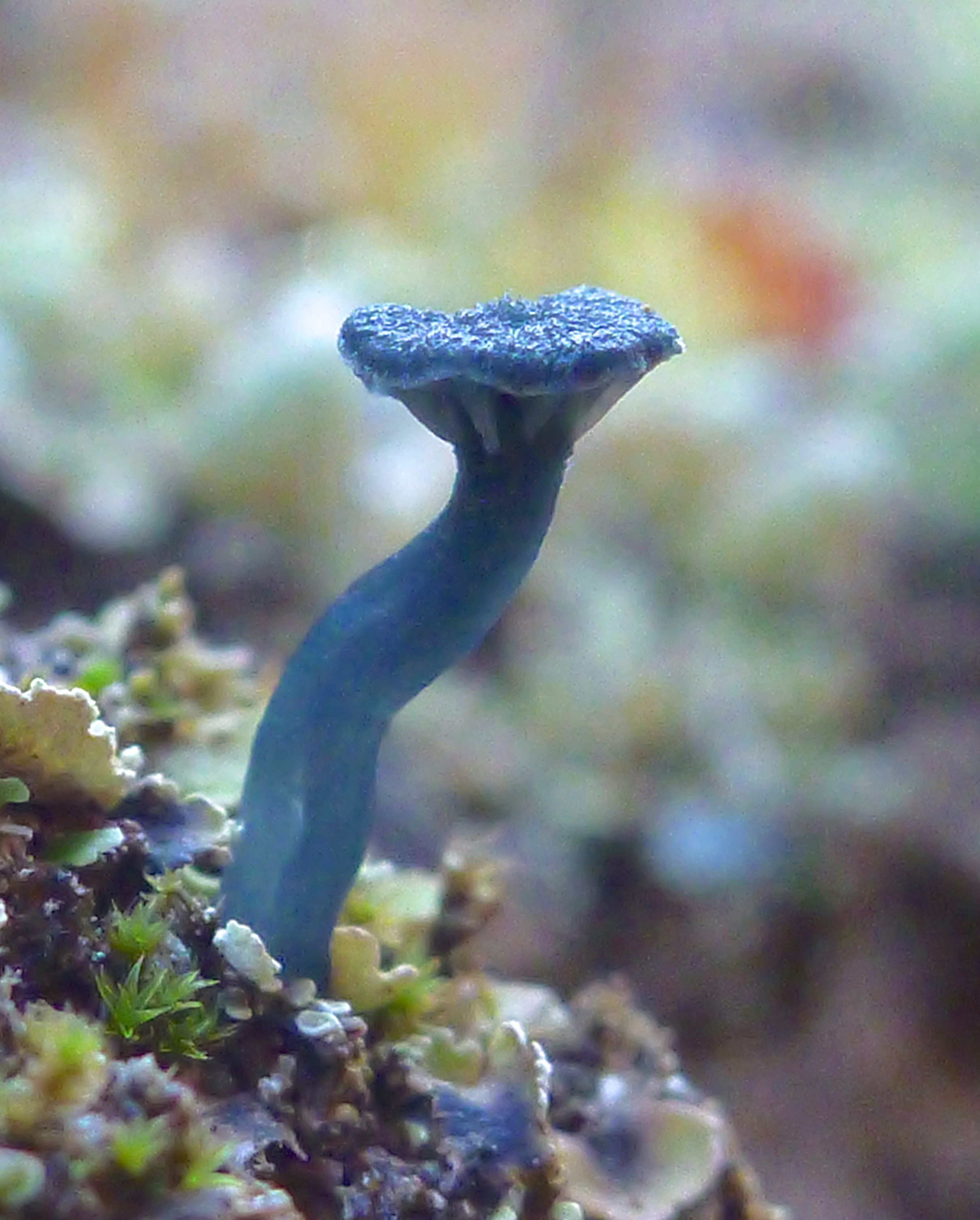

Scientific classification
- Kingdom: Fungi
- Division: Basidiomycota
- Class: Agaricomycetes
- Order: Agaricales
- Family: Hygrophoraceae
- Genus: Arrhenia
- Species: A. chlorocyanea

Binomial name
- Arrhenia chlorocyanea (Pat.) Redhead, Lutzoni, Moncalvo & Vilgalys (2002)

Synonyms
- Agaricus umbellifer var. viridis Hornem. (1819); Agaricus chlorocyaneus Pat. (1885); Omphalina umbellifera var. viridis (Hornem.) Quél. (1886); Omphalia chlorocyanea (Pat.) Sacc. (1887); Omphalia umbellifera var. viridis (Hornem.) Sacc. (1887); Omphalia viridis (Hornem.) J.E.Lange (1930); Omphalia umbellifera f. viridis (Hornem.) Cejp (1936); Omphalina chlorocyanea (Pat.) Singer (1952); Omphalina viridis (Hornem.) Kuyper (1984)

= Arrhenia chlorocyanea =

Species of fungus

Arrhenia chlorocyanea, commonly known as the verdigris navel, is a species of agaric fungus in the family Hygrophoraceae. Originally named as a species of Agaricus in 1885, and later classified as a member of Omphalina, the species was transferred to the genus Arrhenia in 2002.

The blue mushroom's caps are under 2 centimetres (3/4 in) wide and the stems are 1–4 cm (3/8–1 5/8 in) tall. The spore print is white. Entoloma species such as E. incarnatofuscescens may appear somewhat similar, but have a pink spore print.

It can be found in association with mosses in Europe and North America.
