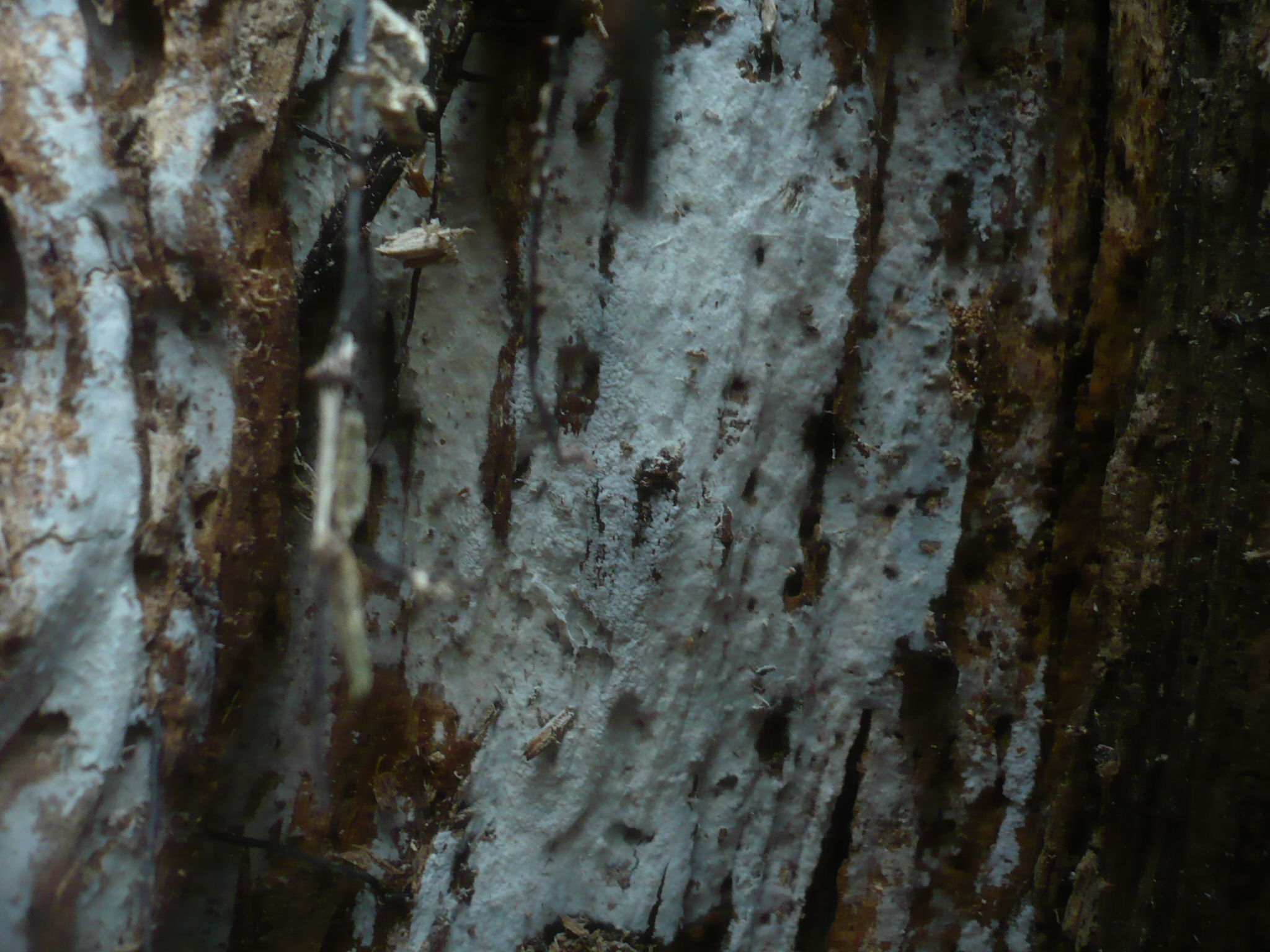

Scientific classification
- Kingdom: Fungi
- Division: Basidiomycota
- Class: Agaricomycetes
- Order: Agaricales
- Family: Hygrophoraceae
- Genus: Eonema; Redhead, Lücking & Lawrey (2009)

Type species
- Eonema pyriforme (M.P.Christ.) Redhead, Lücking & Lawrey (2009)

Synonyms
- Xenasma pyriforme M.P.Christ. (1960); Athelidium pyriforme (M.P.Christ.) Oberw.; Athelia pyriformis (M.P.Christ.) Jülich (1972)

= Eonema =

Genus of fungi

Eonema is a fungal genus in the family Hygrophoraceae. It is monotypic, consisting of the single corticioid species Eonema pyriforme. This fungus was previously classified in the genus Athelia until molecular analysis demonstrated that it was unrelated to the Atheliales and instead nested within the Hygrophoraceae.
