= Corella (lichen) =

Scientific classification
- Kingdom: Fungi
- Division: Basidiomycota
- Class: Agaricomycetes
- Order: Agaricales
- Family: Hygrophoraceae
- Genus: Corella; Vain. (1890)

Type species
- Corella brasiliensis Vain. (1890)

Species
- C. brasiliensis C. melvinii

Genus of basidiolichens

Corella is a small genus of basidiolichens in the family Hygrophoraceae. The genus was proposed in 1890 by the Finnish lichenologist Edvard Vainio based on specimens from Brazil, and, for more than a century, only the type species C. brasiliensis was recognised. Genetic studies published in 2013 showed that Corella and the morphologically similar foliose genus Cora belong to separate, well-supported lineages within the subtribe Dictyonemateae, and that their leaf-like thalli evolved independently. high-throughput DNA barcoding of both fresh collections and herbarium specimens up to 130 years old has since revealed at least ten phylogenetic lineages, and extended confirmed records from Costa Rica southward to Brazil and Colombia; however, only C. brasiliensis and C. melvinii have so far been formally described. These lichens form thin, grey-olive, scale- to leaf-like patches on soil-covered rock and other damp substrates in humid montane forests.

== Taxonomy and phylogeny ==
Corella is a genus of basidiolichens – fungi that live in partnership with cyanobacteria – placed in the family Hygrophoraceae. The genus was circumscribed by the Finnish lichenologist Edvard August Vainio in 1890. Vainio's Latin diagnosis portrayed Corella as having a thallus made of tiny, scale-to leaf-like lobes that spread irregularly yet rise slightly from the substrate. It is smooth and grey-olive on the upper surface, whitish beneath, and built of very thin-walled hyphae that remain only loosely interwoven; true rhizines and any sort of protective cortex are absent. Most of the upper part of the thallus is packed with the photobiont layer, while a much thinner, cotton-wool-like medulla of loosely woven hyphae (about 3–4 μm thick) occupies the lower margin. The cyanobacterial partner, which Vainio recognised as a Scytonema species, occurs in short, twisted filaments whose bluish-green cells are interspersed with clear-walled heterocysts and sheathed in a delicate gelatinous envelope. He simultaneously described the first—and for many years the only—species, C. brasiliensis, from soil-covered rock at 1,500 m elevation near Caraça in Minas Gerais, Brazil, noting its squamulose to minute-foliose lobes 15–30 mm across and the same cortex-less anatomy that distinguishes the genus as a whole.

A 2013 multilocus phylogeny of 29 taxa recognised five generic lineages within the Dictyonema clade, with Corella forming one of these well-supported groups. Within that tree, Corella and Acantholichen make a monophyletic pair that is sister to the foliose genus Cora. The analysis also indicates that Corella's leaf-like (foliose) body plan evolved independently from the superficially similar thalli seen in Cora.

A 2022 high-throughput DNA-barcoding study that combined fresh field collections with herbarium sheets up to 130 years old generated 54 internal transcribed spacer (ITS) sequences of Corella (part of a 1,325-taxon data set) and confirmed that the genus forms a well-supported clade sister to Acantholichen and distinct from Cora. Illumina dye sequencing was used to recover usable DNA from more than three-quarters of the historical specimens. The same work extended the known ranges of six named Corella species, added records for eleven previously unsampled countries, and revealed dozens of additional, undescribed lineages, indicating that diversity in the genus remains substantially underestimated.

== Description ==
The thalli of Corella species range from macrosquamulose (large overlapping scales) to sizeable, thin, foliose lobes that sit flat or slightly lifted from the substrate. A true paraplectenchymatous cortex – a protective skin of tightly interwoven fungal cells – covers the surface and is derived directly from the sheath that wraps the photobiont layer.

== Photobiont ==
The photobiont is the cyanobacterium Rhizonema, whose filaments break into irregular cell clusters; these clusters are enclosed by a jigsaw-puzzle-shaped hyphal sheath equipped with tubular haustoria – minute fungal pegs that penetrate and gently inflate the cyanobacterial cells to secure contact and nutrient exchange. This combination of sheath structure and haustoria sets Corella apart from Cyphellostereum (which lacks haustoria) and from Cora, whose cortex is constructed differently.

A 2020 barcode survey of 635 neotropical basidiolichen specimens found Rhizonema in every member of the subtribe Dictyonemateae. Within that pool, the widespread R. interruptum proved by far the commonest symbiont and occurred in all five genera, including almost every sequenced Corella thallus. An exception came from Brazil's Santuário do Caraça, where two cryptic species grow side-by-side: Corella brasiliensis keeps its usual R. interruptum partner, while an undescribed "Corella sp. 1" consistently teams up with the rarer R. neotropicum. The pattern suggests moderate specificity—each fungal lineage tends to stick with a single Rhizonema species—yet shows that compatible switches can occur, implying that photobiont availability, rather than strict coevolution, drives the partnership.

== Species ==
Dal‑Forno and colleagues accept two species in the genus. Corella brasiliensis, originally described by Vainio in 1890 and long misassigned to Cora, is now shown by molecular data to stand apart; its known range spans humid montane forests in Brazil, Costa Rica and Colombia. Corella melvinii, transferred from Dictyonema in 2013, is so far known only from Costa Rica and has not yet been included in molecular datasets. Two historical names, C. tomentosa and C. zahlbruckneri, are treated as synonyms of C. brasiliensis, although some online databases (e.g. Index Fungorum) have not yet incorporated this revision and still place them in Cora glabrata. Molecular barcoding has revealed substantially higher diversity in Corella than suggested by formal nomenclature. High-throughput sequencing of historical herbarium material confirms at least ten phylogenetic lineages in Corella, but no additional taxa have yet been validly published.
