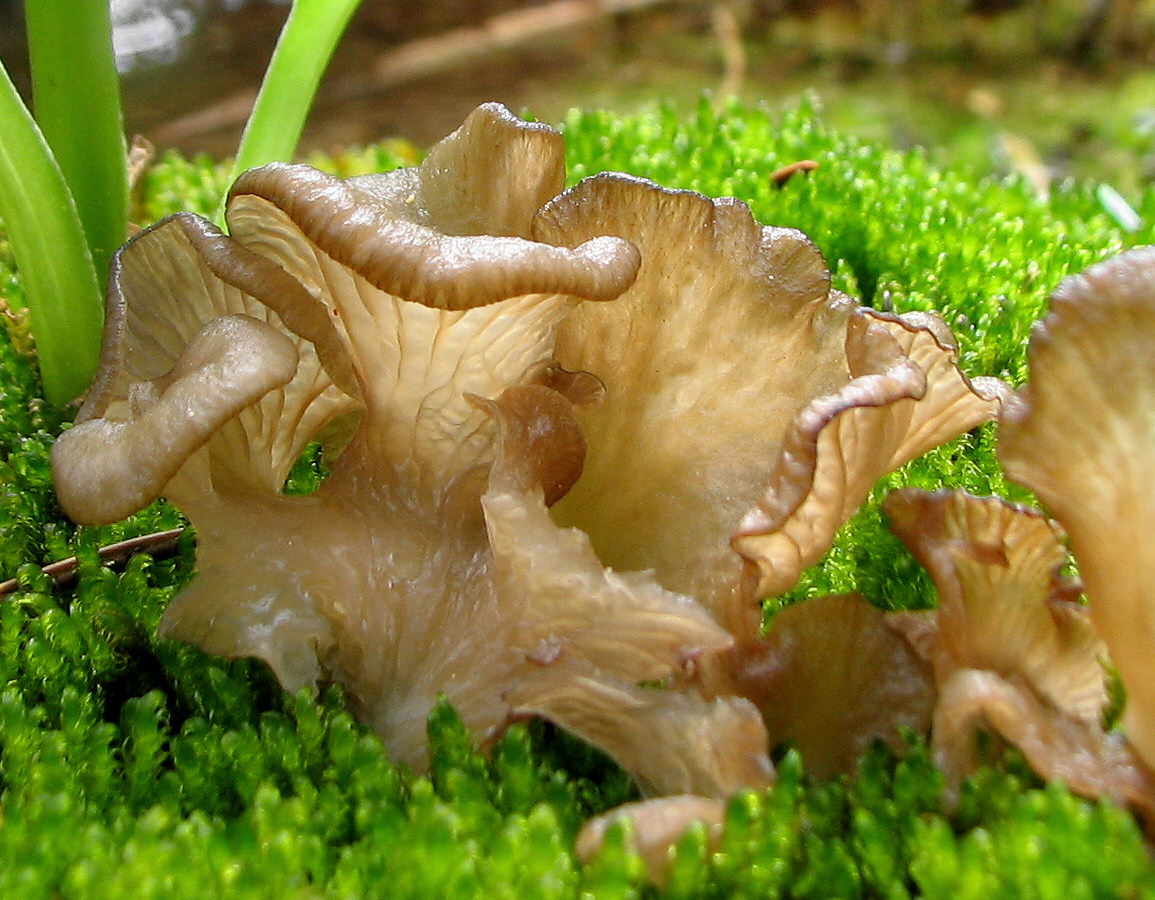

Conservation status
- Secure (NatureServe)

Scientific classification
- Domain: Eukaryota
- Kingdom: Fungi
- Division: Basidiomycota
- Class: Agaricomycetes
- Order: Agaricales
- Family: Hygrophoraceae
- Genus: Arrhenia
- Species: A. lobata

Binomial name
- Arrhenia lobata (Pers.) Kühner & Lamoure ex Redhead 1984

Synonyms
- Merulius lobatus Pers. (1801); Leptoglossum lobatum (Fr.) Ricken (1910)

= Arrhenia lobata =

Species of fungus

Arrhenia lobata is a species of agaric fungus in the family Hygrophoraceae. It is found in the Iberian Peninsula and central Europe, and North America. It associates with mosses and may have a parasitic relationship with them.
