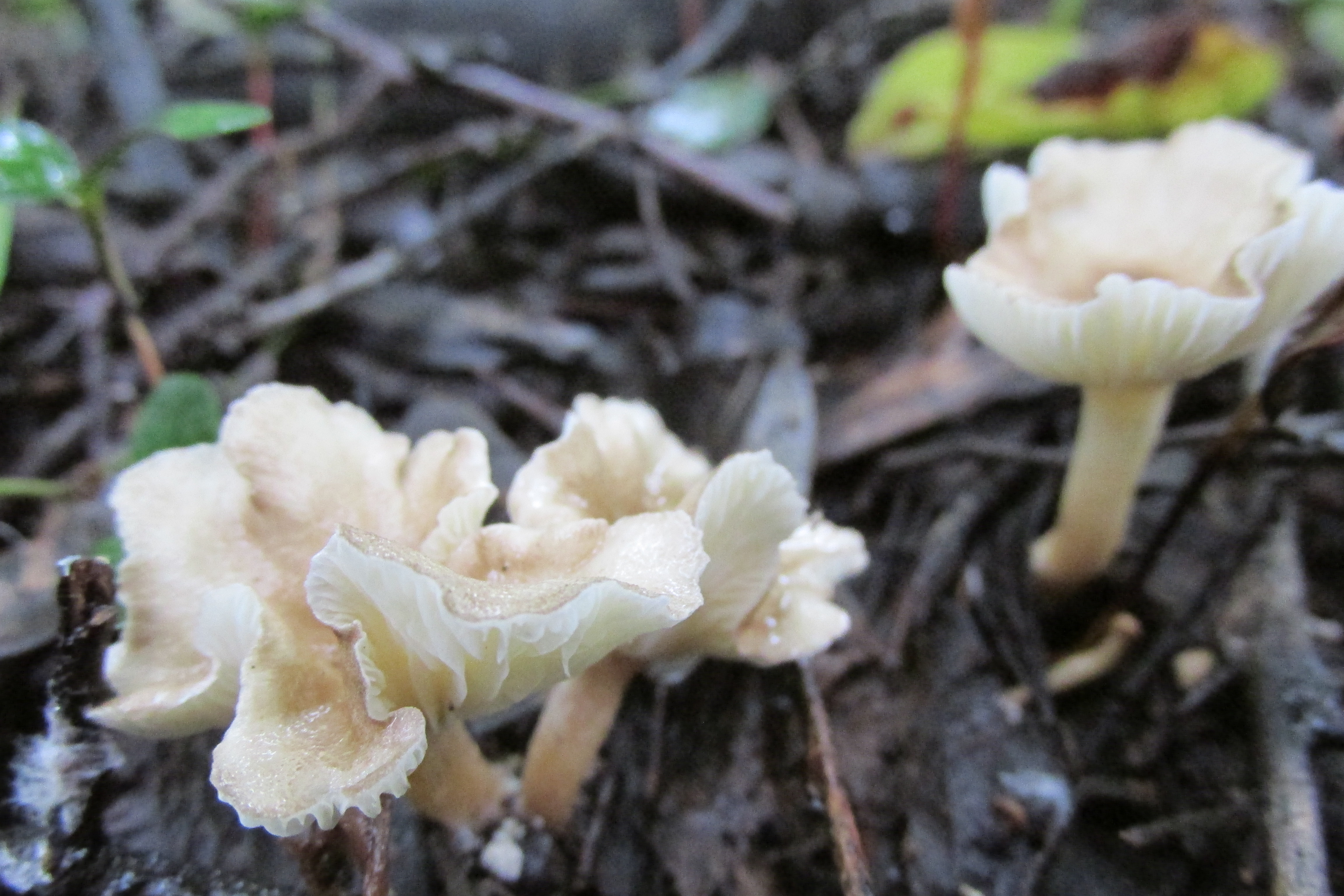
- Spodocybe trulliformis

Scientific classification
- Kingdom: Fungi
- Division: Basidiomycota
- Class: Agaricomycetes
- Order: Agaricales
- Family: Hygrophoraceae
- Genus: Spodocybe (He) Yang (2021)

Type species
- Spodocybe rugosiceps (He) Yang (2021)

= Spodocybe =

Genus of fungi

Spodocybe is a genus of mushrooms in the family Hygrophoraceae. Spodo- means grey and -cybe means head, referring to the grey pileus of the known species. At least two species were formerly classified as species of Clitocybe, as they are clitocyboid mushrooms, bearing a superficial resemblance in morphology to the genus.

== Description ==
Small, clitocyboid mushrooms. Grey, convex pileus, applanate to infundibuliform, center becoming depressed with age. White to cream, deeply decurrent gills, often running significantly down the stem. Stipe central, not quite cylindrical, the same or similarly colored as the cap. Inamyloid, smooth, thin-walled, ellipsoid, hyaline, colorless spores. Clamp connections abundant in all parts of the mushroom.

== Ecology and distribution ==
Saprophytic, gregarious (growing in sparse clusters), or caespitose (growing in dense clusters) in coniferous or mixed forest.

== Species ==
- Spodocybe bispora
- Spodocybe collina
- Spodocybe fontqueri
- Spodocybe herbarum
- Spodocybe rugosiceps
- Spodocybe trulliformis
