= Aeruginospora =

Scientific classification
- Kingdom: Fungi
- Division: Basidiomycota
- Class: Agaricomycetes
- Order: Agaricales
- Family: Hygrophoraceae
- Genus: Aeruginospora; Höhn. (1908)

Type species
- Aeruginospora singularis Höhn. (1908)

Species
- ?A. furfuracea A. singularis

Genus of fungi

Aeruginospora is a genus of fungi in the family Hygrophoraceae. It was formerly placed in the family Tricholomataceae, but it was moved to the Hygrophoraceae in a recent review of the family based on its morphological similarity to Chrysomphalina and especially Haasiella. It might be that Haasiella, which differs in spore color and ecology, is a junior synonym of Aeruginospora, but this has not yet been tested in a molecular phylogenetics study. The genus, described by Franz Xaver Rudolf von Höhnel in 1908, currently contains two species found in New Zealand and Indonesia. Six species formerly placed in Aeruginospora (A. foetens, A. hiemalis, A. hymenocephala, A. microspora, A. paupertina, and A. schulzeri) were transferred to the genus Camarophyllopsis. A. furfuracea might also belong in Camarophyllopsis, but it has not yet been restudied.
