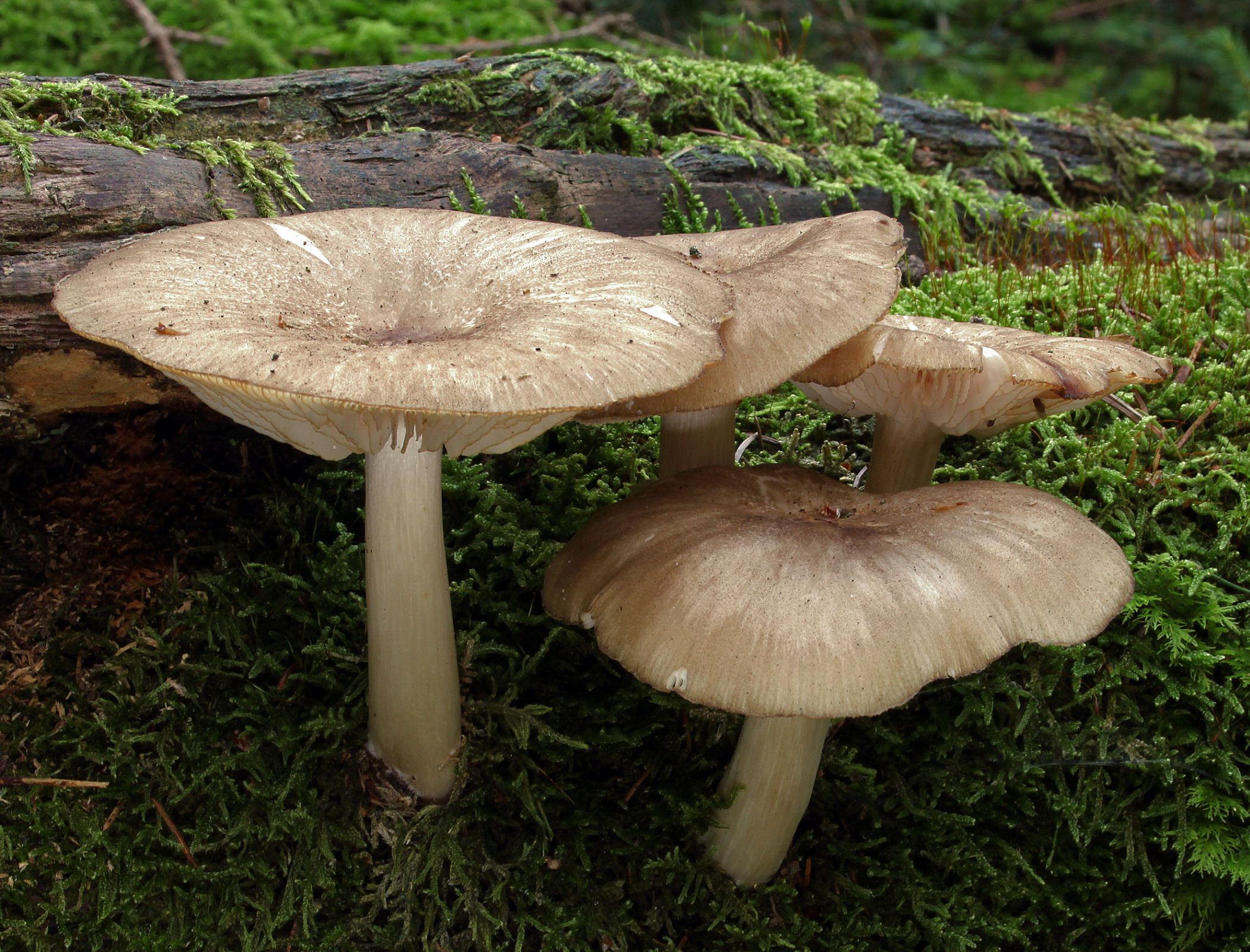
- Megacollybia platyphylla

Scientific classification
- Kingdom: Fungi
- Division: Basidiomycota
- Class: Agaricomycetes
- Order: Agaricales
- Family: Marasmiaceae
- Genus: Megacollybia; Kotl. & Pouzar

Type species
- Megacollybia platyphylla (Pers.) Kotl. & Pouzar

Species
- M. clitocyboidea M. fallax M. fusca M. marginata M. platyphylla M. rimosa M. rodmani M. subfurfuracea M. texensis

= Megacollybia =

Genus of fungi

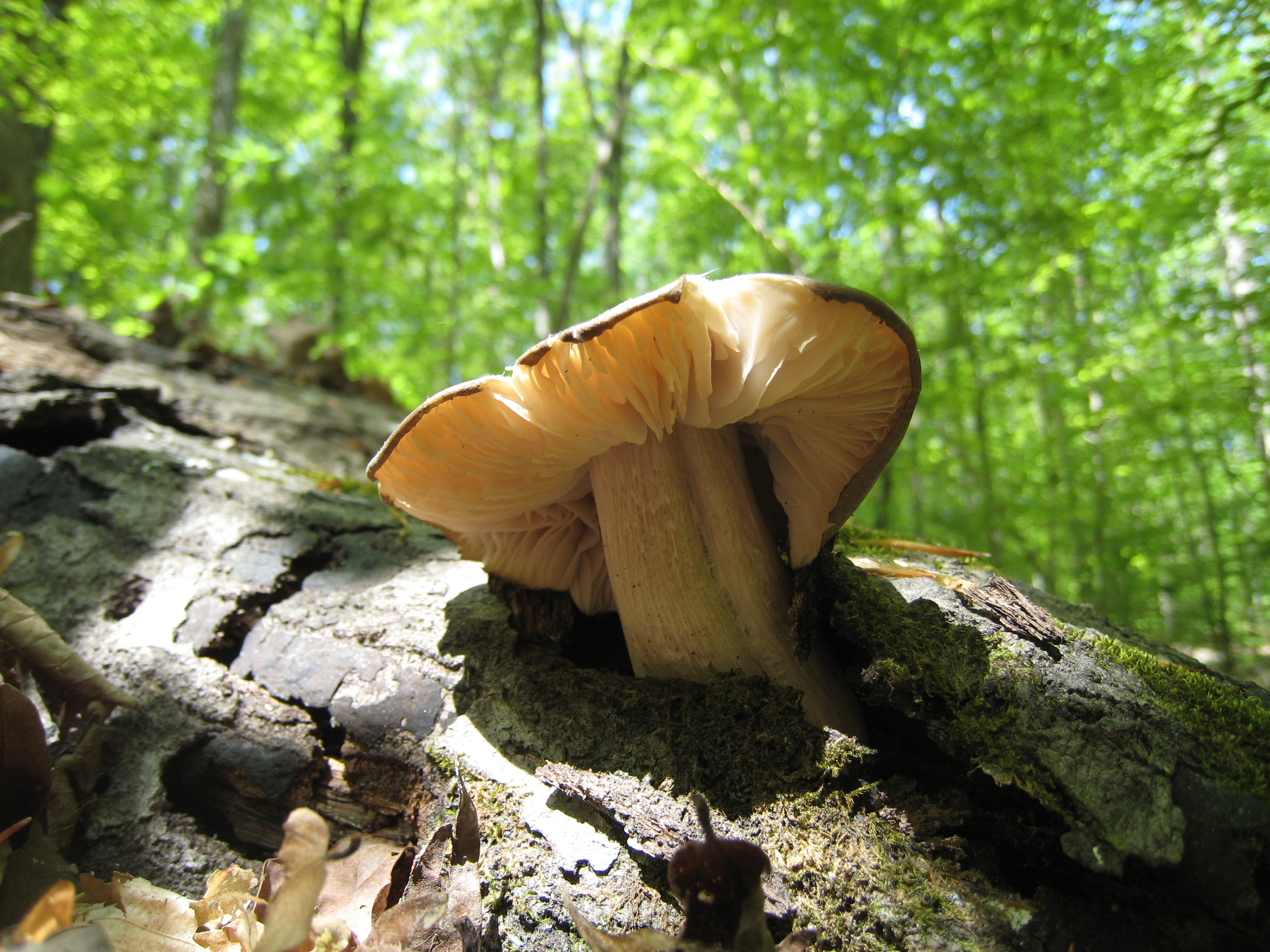
Megacollybia platyphylla

Megacollybia is a genus of fungus in the family Marasmiaceae. Previously thought to be monotypic, the genus was split into several species based on genetic data in 2007 . The type species, M. platyphylla, is restricted in distribution to Europe, Scandinavia, and western and central Russia. M. rimosa was described as new to science from Brazil in 2013.

Adults of the pleasing fungus beetle Tritoma mimetica have been recorded from supposed M. platyphylla, but as this beetle is endemic to North America, the mushroom in question seems to be one of the recently-separated American species. At any rate, Megacollybia does not seem to be a regular food source for those beetles.

== See also ==
- List of Marasmiaceae genera
