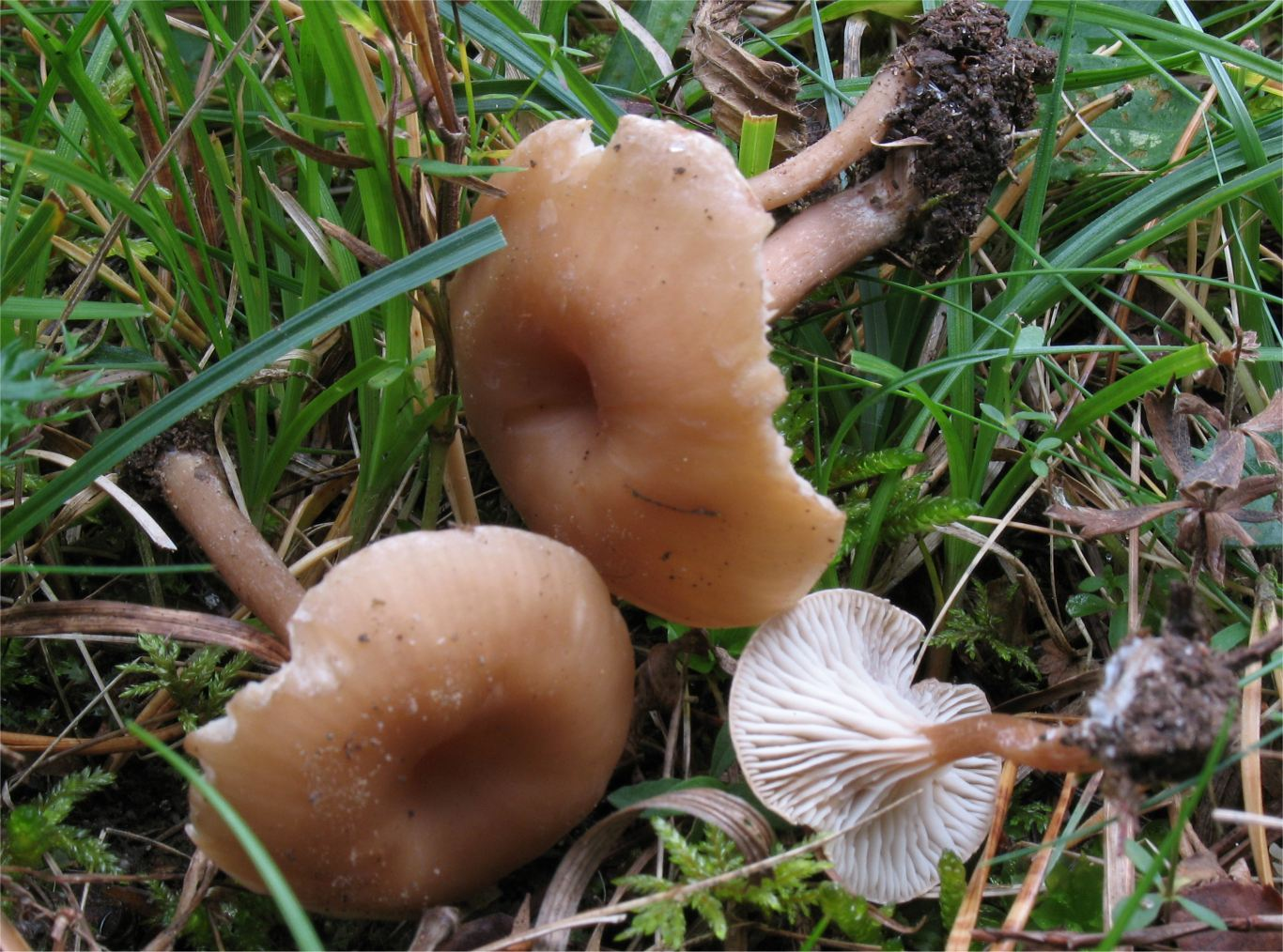
- Pseudoomphalina kalchbrenneri

Scientific classification
- Domain: Eukaryota
- Kingdom: Fungi
- Division: Basidiomycota
- Class: Agaricomycetes
- Order: Agaricales
- Family: Tricholomataceae
- Genus: Pseudoomphalina (Singer) Singer (1956)

Type species
- Pseudoomphalina kalchbrenneri (Bres.) Singer (1956)

Species
- P. angelesiana; P. cokeri; P. felleoides; P. graveolens; P. kalchbrenneri; P. umbrinopurpurascens

Synonyms
- Neohygrophorus Singer ex Singer (1962)

= Pseudoomphalina =

Genus of fungi

Pseudoomphalina is a genus of fungi placed in the family Tricholomataceae for convenience. The genus contains six species that are widespread in northern temperate areas. Pseudoomphalina was circumscribed by Rolf Singer in 1956. Pseudoomphalina was found to be paraphyletic to Neohygrophorus in a molecular phylogenetics study and since Pseudoomphalina is an older name, Neohygrophyorus was synonymized with it. The type species of Neohygrophorus was Neohygrophorus angelesianus, now Pseudoomphalina angelesiana. In earlier classifications based on anatomy prior to DNA sequence-based classifications, its unusual combination of features led taxonomists to independently create two subgenera in two genera: Hygrophorus subg. Pseudohygrophorus and Clitocybe subg. Mutabiles; the latter based on Neohygrophorus angelesianus but described under a new species name which is now placed in synonymy, Clitocybe mutabilis. All species of Pseudoomphalina are united by the presence of clamp-connections in their hyphae, an interwoven gill trama and amyloid spores. Pseudoomphalina angelesiana possesses grey-violaceous pigments that turn red in alkali solutions and lacks filiform, hyphal sterile elements in its hymenium and stipitipellis. These were features used to distinguish it from Pseudoomphalina as a genus, but Pseudoomphalina umbrinopurpurascens possesses these same pigments and the filiform elements of Pseudoomphalina. Molecular phylogenetics studies have also found some former species of Pseudoomphalina to belong in other genera. Pseudoomphalina pachyphylla was moved to its own genus, Pseudolaccaria, and Pseudoomphalina clusiliformis was synonymized with it. Pseudoomphalina flavoaurantia and Pseudoomphalina lignicola were found to belong in Clitocybula. Phylogenetically, Pseudoomphalina is in a tricholomatoid clade but not in the Tricholomataceae.

== See also ==
- List of Tricholomataceae genera
