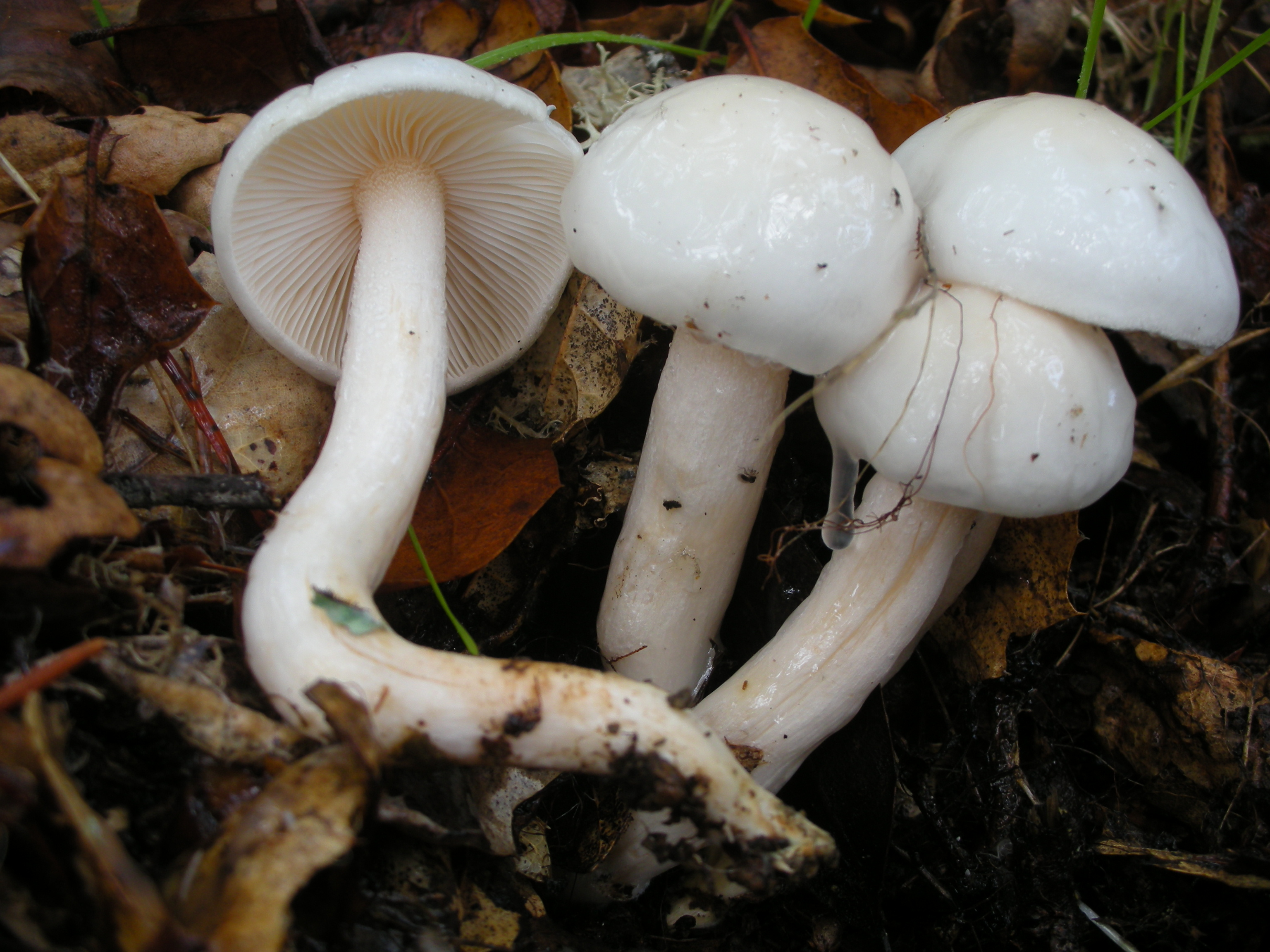
- Hygrophorus eburneus

Scientific classification
- Kingdom: Fungi
- Division: Basidiomycota
- Class: Agaricomycetes
- Order: Agaricales
- Family: Hygrophoraceae; Lotsy (1907)

Type genus
- Hygrophorus Fr. (1836)

Genera
- 30; See text

= Hygrophoraceae =

Family of fungi

The Hygrophoraceae are a family of fungi in the order Agaricales. Originally conceived as containing white-spored, thick-gilled agarics (gilled mushrooms), including Hygrophorus and Hygrocybe species (the waxcaps or waxy caps), DNA evidence has extended the limits of the family, so it now contains not only agarics, but also basidiolichens and corticioid fungi. Species are thus diverse and are variously ectomycorrhizal, lichenized, associated with mosses, or saprotrophic. The family contains 34 genera and over 1000 species. None is of any great economic importance, though fruit bodies of some Hygrocybe and Hygrophorus species are considered edible and may be collected for sale in local markets.

== Taxonomy ==
=== History ===
The family Hygrophoraceae was first proposed by Dutch botanist Johannes Paulus Lotsy (1907) to accommodate agarics with thick, waxy lamellae (gills) and white spores. Lotsy's concept of the family included not only the waxcap-related genera Hygrophorus, Hygrocybe, Camarophyllus (= Hygrophorus), and Godfrinia (= Hygrocybe), but also Gomphidius (despite its blackish spores) and Nyctalis (= Asterophora). Not all subsequent authors accepted the Hygrophoraceae; Carleton Rea (1922), for example, continued to place these genera within a widely defined Agaricaceae.

In his major and influential revision of the Agaricales, however, Rolf Singer (1951) did accept the Hygrophoraceae, omitting Gomphidius and Nyctalis, but including Neohygrophorus. Singer's circumscription, with a few later additions, was followed by most authors until the 1990s. Thus the 1995 edition of the Dictionary of the Fungi listed Austroomphaliaster, Bertrandia (=Hygrocybe), Camarophyllopsis, Cuphophyllus, Humidicutis, Hygroaster, Hygrocybe, Hygrophorus, Hygrotrama (= Camarophyllopsis), Neohygrophorus (=Pseudoomphalina), and Pseudohygrocybe (=Hygrocybe) as genera of the Hygrophoraceae. Cornelis Bas (1990), however, did not consider the group distinct, placing the hygrophoroid genera within the Tricholomataceae, a disposition followed by the next (2001) edition of the Dictionary of the Fungi. In contrast, Marcel Bon (1990) believed the Hygrophoraceae were so distinct, he placed the family in its own separate order, the Hygrophorales.

=== Current status ===
Recent molecular research, based on cladistic analysis of DNA sequences, suggests the Hygrophoraceae are distinct from the Tricholomataceae and are monophyletic (and hence a natural grouping). The genera Camarophyllopsis and Neohygrophorus, however, do not belong within the family, but several other agaric and non-agaric genera do. The agaric genera include Ampulloclitocybe, Cantharellula, and Lichenomphalia, as well as the partly agaric, partly cyphelloid genus Arrhenia. The non-agaric genera include the corticioid Eonema (formerly placed in Athelia) and Cyphellostereum, as well as the shelf-like basidiolichen genera Acantholichen, Cora, Corella and Dictyonema. As a result, the Hygrophoraceae as currently understood have no known morphological features in common that define them (synapomorphy).

=== Genera ===
Nowadays, Hygrophoraceae has been subdivided into 4 subfamilies and includes 30 genera:

Hygrophoroideae:

- Aeruginospora
- Chrysomphalina
- Haasiella
- Hygrophorus

Hygrocyboideae:

- Chromosera
- Gliophorus
- Gloioxanthomyces
- Hygroaster
- Hygrocybe
- Neohygrocybe
- Porpolomopsis
- Sinohygrocybe

Lichenomphalioideae:

- Acantholichen
- Arrhenia
- Cantharellula
- Cora
- Corella
- Cyphellostereum
- Dictyonema
- Eonema
- Lichenomphalia
- Pseudoarmillariella
- Semiomphalina

Cuphophylloideae:

- Ampulloclitocybe
- Cantharocybe
- Cuphophyllus
- Spodocybe

Additionally, Hygrophoraceae includes the genus Melanomphalia which is currently unassigned to a subfamily.

== Habitat, nutrition, and distribution ==
The majority of species in the Hygrophoraceae are ground-dwelling, though a few (such as Chrysomphalina species) occur on wood, or on mosses (Arrhenia species), or herbaceous stems (Eonema pyriforme). Most are found in woodland, though (in Europe at least) Hygrocybe species are typical of waxcap grasslands.

Species are nutritionally diverse. Hygrophorus species are ectomycorrhizal, typically forming associations with the roots of living trees. Hygrocybe species are now believed to be moss associates, as are some or all species of Arrhenia and Cantharellula. Three genera, Acantholichen, Dictyonema, and Lichenomphalina, are basidiolichens, forming associations with algae and cyanobacteria. A few genera, such as Ampulloclitocybe and Eonema, may be saprotrophic.

Members of the Hygrophoraceae are distributed worldwide, from the tropics to the subpolar regions. Over 400 species have been described to date.

== Economic usage ==
Fruit bodies of some Hygrophorus and Hygrocybe species are edible and widely collected, sometimes being offered for sale in local markets. Examples of wild mushrooms collected and sold include Hygrophorus russula, H. purpurascens, H. chrysodon, and H. hypothejus in Mexico, and H. eburneus and H. latitabundus in the Spanish Pyrenees. Hygrophorus gliocyclus was used as food by the St'at'imc and Nlaka'pamux people of Canada. None are cultivated commercially.

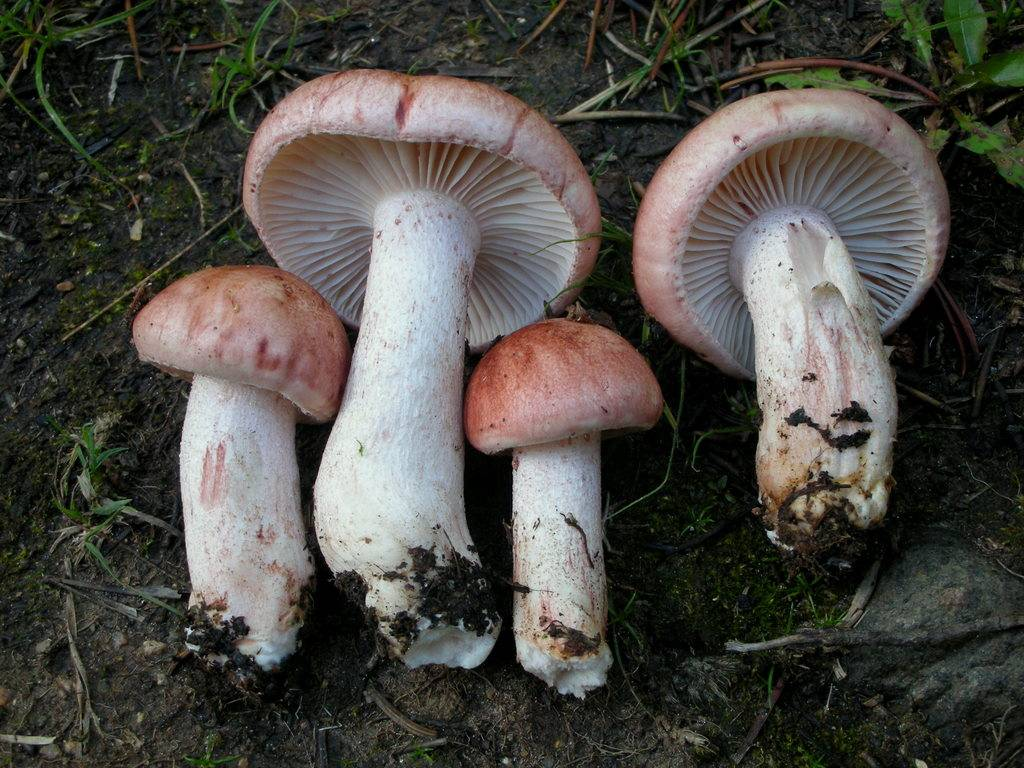
Hygrophorus erubescens

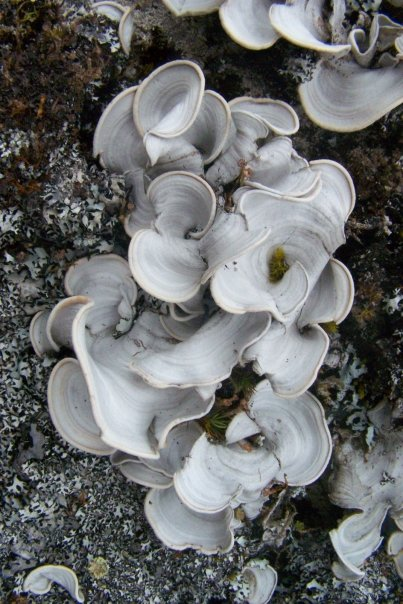
Cora pavonia

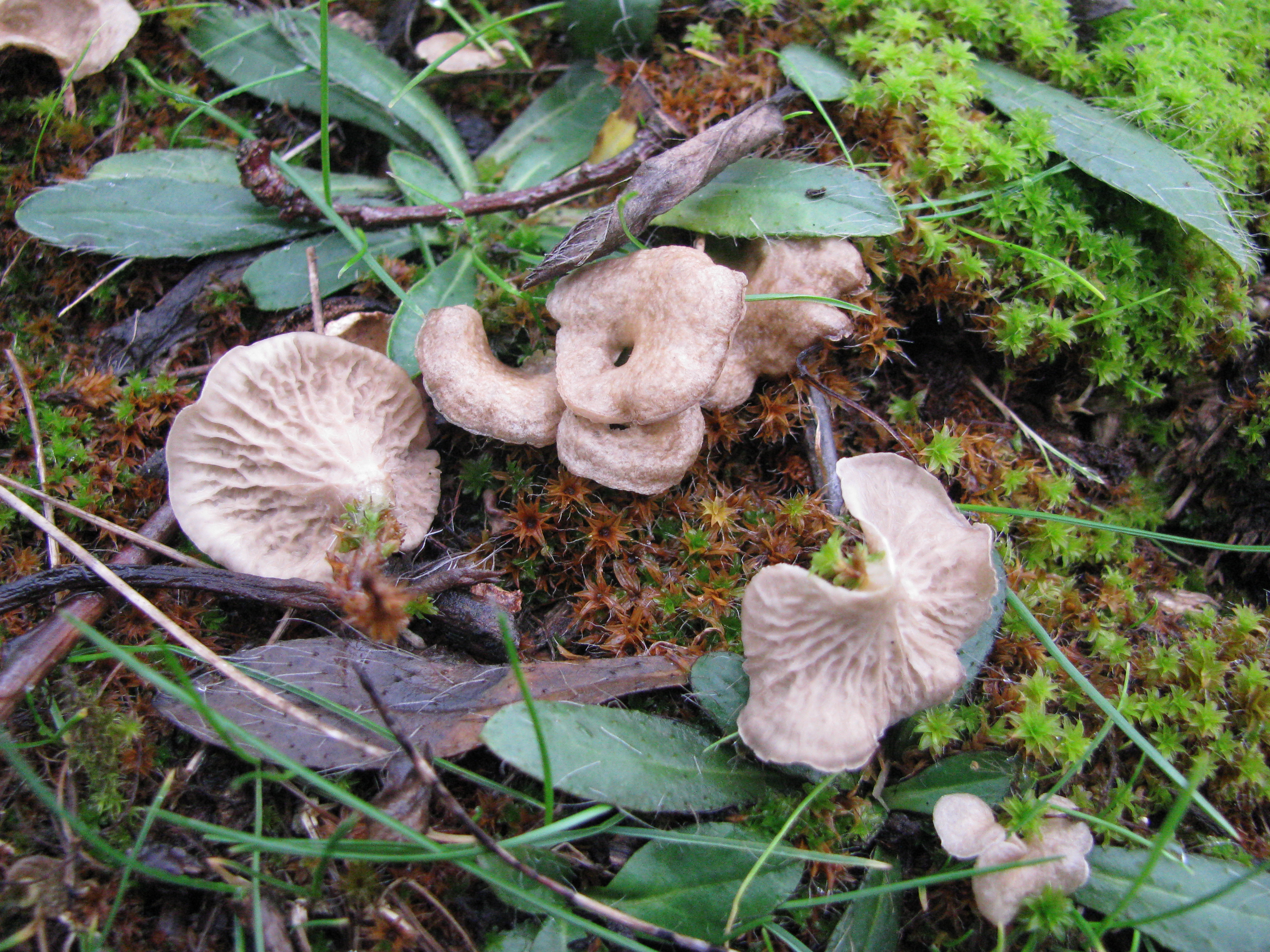
Arrhenia spathulata

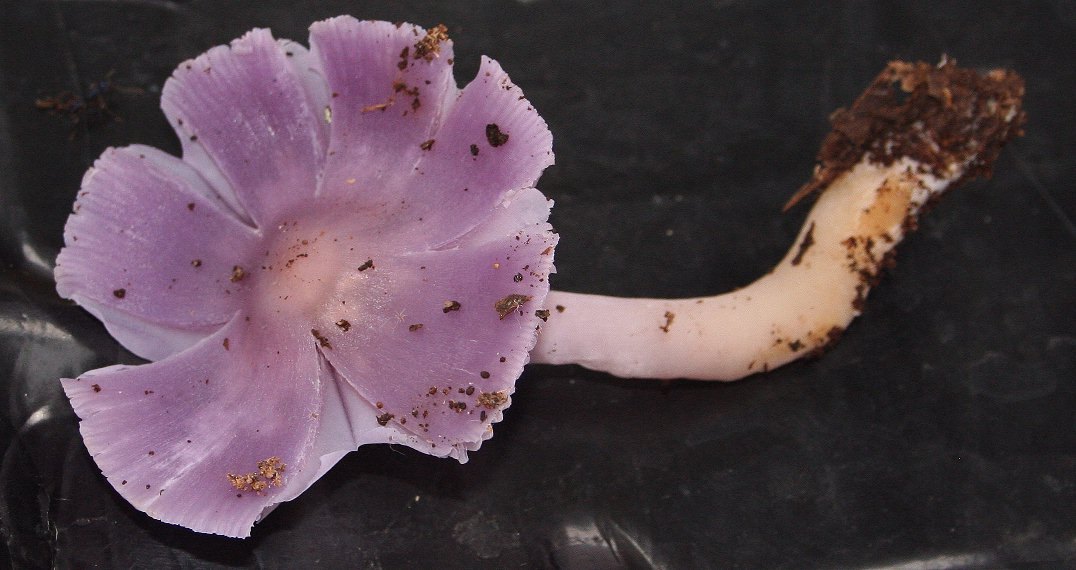
Humidicutis lewelliniae
