= Cora caraana =

Scientific classification
- Kingdom: Fungi
- Division: Basidiomycota
- Class: Agaricomycetes
- Order: Agaricales
- Family: Hygrophoraceae
- Genus: Cora
- Species: C. caraana

Binomial name
- Cora caraana Lücking, S.M.Martins & Lucheta (2016)

Species of lichen

Cora caraana is a rare species of basidiolichen in the family Hygrophoraceae. It was formally described as a new species in 2016 by Robert Lücking, Suzana Maria de Azevedo Martins, and Fabiane Lucheta. The specific epithet caraana refers to the type locality in Caraá (Rio Grande do Sul). It is only known to occur at this location, where it grows as an epiphyte on tree branches in mountainous rainforests. It forms rosettes up to 7 cm across with blue-green lobes that have smooth surfaces and light grey rolled-in edges, producing cream-colored reproductive patches arranged in faint concentric arcs on the underside.

== Taxonomy ==
Cora caraana is a basidiolichen in the family Hygrophoraceae (order Agaricales). It was described in 2016 by Robert Lücking, Josy Martins, and Fernanda Lucheta from a specimen collected in the Caraá Environmental Protection Area (Rio Grande do Sul, Brazil). The epithet, caraana, refers to this type locality. Internal transcribed spacer DNA sequence data place the species in a clade that also contains C. verjonensis (Colombia) and C. viliewoa (Costa Rica), clearly apart from the morphologically similar Bolivian species C. boleslia.

== Description ==
The thallus of Cora caraana is epiphytic and foliose, forming rosettes up to 7 cm across on shaded branches clothed with hepatic mats. It comprises five to ten semicircular lobes, 0.5–1.5 cm wide and 0.5–1 cm long, separated by short, indistinct radial sutures. Fresh lobes are bluish-green (aeruginous) with a smooth, glabrous surface and thin, rolled-in (involute) light-grey margins; herbarium material turns grey. The lower surface lacks a cortex (ecorticate) and shows a felty-arachnoid medulla that is green-grey when fresh and bluish-grey when dry.

Sections are 150–200 micrometres thick. A compact upper cortex 10–20 μm deep overlies a 40–50 μm zone of anticlinal hyphae; both layers consist of 4–5 μm-wide hyphae. The photobiont layer is 50–100 μm thick and deep aeruginous; the medulla, 30–50 μm, is hydrophobic and bears scattered papilliform-to-coralloid hyphae 2–3 μm wide. Clamp connections are absent.

The hymenophore (the fertile spore-bearing surface) is corticioid-cyphelloid, forming cream-coloured, concave patches 1–2 mm long and 1–5 mm broad that align in faint concentric arcs beneath the lobes. Sections (40–70 μm) reveal abundant palisade-like basidioles (20–30 × 5–6 μm) and scarce four-spored basidia (20–35 × 4–6 μm); basidiospores have not been recorded. Thin-layer chromatography detected no secondary metabolites.

== Habitat and distribution ==
As of its original publication, Cora caraana was known to occur only at its type locality (roughly 410 m elevation) in the southernmost outliers of the tropical montane Atlantic Forest of Rio Grande do Sul, Brazil. It grows epiphytically on shaded tree branches, partly overgrowing liverworts, in a humid, evergreen rainforest microclimate characterised by high rainfall, diffuse light, and frequent mist.
