= Cora setosa =

Scientific classification
- Kingdom: Fungi
- Division: Basidiomycota
- Class: Agaricomycetes
- Order: Agaricales
- Family: Hygrophoraceae
- Genus: Cora
- Species: C. setosa

Binomial name
- Cora setosa L.Vargas, Moncada & Lücking (2014)

Species of lichen

Cora setosa is a rare species of basidiolichen in the family Hygrophoraceae. It is found in Colombia. Its thallus is emerald-green when fresh, measuring up to 8 cm across and comprising four or five circular lobes arranged in layers above each other. The lichen is distinguished by its broad concentric ridges on the upper surface and distinctive white bristles along the edges of its lobes, with pale yellow reproductive patches forming concentric lines on the underside.

== Taxonomy ==
The lichen was formally described as a new species in 2014 by Leidy Yasmín Vargas, Bibiana Moncada, and Robert Lücking. The type was collected in Finca El Paraiso (Vereda Centro Sur, Chámeza) at an altitude of 1,400 m (4,600 ft). It is only known to occur at the type locality, where it grows as an epiphyte on branches in partially shaded spots. The specific epithet refers to the setose (i.e. bristly) lateral lobe margins. Similar species include Cora cyphellifera, C. aspera, and C. gyrolophia.

== Description ==
Cora setosa grows as a leaf-like (foliose) lichen that lives on the bark and twigs of small forest trees and shrubs. Each thallus—the combined lichen body formed by fungus and partner cyanobacteria—can reach about 8 cm across and is built from four or five near-circular lobes. These lobes (1–4 cm wide and 1–2 cm long) often stack in tiers one above the other along the branch. They are either unbranched or fork once or twice, with narrow "sutures" marking the junctions between branches. When freshly moistened the upper surface is a vivid emerald green; in dried herbarium material it turns grey but shows clear alternating dark and light rings and broad raised ridges. The surface itself is smooth, yet the lobe margins bristle with conspicuous setae—stiff, colourless bundles of fungal threads 1–2 mm long. The lower surface is featureless white whether wet or dry.

In cross-section the thallus is comparatively thin (about 150–225 μm) and divided into three layers. The outer cortex (60–75 μm thick) forms a protective "skin" of fungal hyphae arranged parallel to the surface in its upper part and roughly perpendicular beneath. Next is the photobiont zone (50–80 μm), where intensely emerald-green cyanobacteria occur in tight globular groups 35–50 μm wide, each cell 10–13 μm across. These clusters are sheathed in jigsaw-like fungal cells, and additional hyphae 5–7 μm wide weave through the layer. The innermost medulla (25–75 μm) is a looser mesh of mainly parallel hyphae, providing structural support.

Unlike many basidiolichens, C. setosa develops its fertile tissue (the hymenophore) on the underside. It appears as pale yellow, felt-like patches 1–5 mm long and up to 1 mm wide, arranged in concentric lines that mirror the lobes above. No characteristic secondary metabolites have been detected by thin-layer chromatography, and the lichen's vivid colours and distinctive bristles therefore provide the most reliable field characters for recognition.
