= Cora campestris =

Scientific classification
- Kingdom: Fungi
- Division: Basidiomycota
- Class: Agaricomycetes
- Order: Agaricales
- Family: Hygrophoraceae
- Genus: Cora
- Species: C. campestris

Binomial name
- Cora campestris Dal-Forno, Eliasaro & A.A.Spielm. (2016)

Species of lichen

Cora campestris is a species of basidiolichen in the family Hygrophoraceae. It was formally described as a new species in 2016 by Manuela Dal Forno, Sionara Eliasaro, and Adriano Afonso Spielmann. The specific epithet campestris refers to its habitat in the high-altitude fields (campos de altitude) of southeastern Brazil, where it grows on exposed rock outcrops. It forms rosettes up to 8 cm across with dark olive-grey lobes that have light grey rolled-in edges and orange-brown reproductive patches arranged in a net-like pattern on the underside.

== Taxonomy ==
Cora campestris is a basidiolichen in the family Hygrophoraceae (order Agaricales). It was formally described in 2016 by Manuela Dal Forno, Luciana Eliasaro, and José Luiz Spielmann from material collected on Morro dos Perdidos in the state of Paraná, Brazil. The epithet, campestris, refers to the campos de altitude—high-elevation rock-grassland (campos rupestres) habitats of south-eastern Brazil in which the lichen occurs. The internal transcribed spacer (ITS) ribosomal DNA sequences separate C. campestris from other rock-dwelling members of the genus such as C. leslactuca and C. fuscodavidiana, supporting its status as a distinct lineage.

== Description ==
The thallus of Cora campestris is saxicolous and foliose, forming rosettes up to 8 cm across over cushions of bryophytes on exposed rock. It comprises three to five semicircular lobes, 1–2.5 cm wide and 2–4 cm long, that lie adjacent or slightly overlap. Lobes are sparsely branched, linked by short radial sutures, and have a uniform dark olive-grey upper surface when hydrated. The rolled-in (involute) margins are light grey and glabrous, turning yellowish at the tips after drying. The upper surface is even to very shallowly concentrically undulate (wavy) when moist and becomes distinctly wavy (undulate) on drying; no concentric colour rings develop.

The lower surface lacks a cortex (ecorticate) and shows a light-grey, felty-arachnoid medulla. Vertical sections are 275–350 micrometres (μm) thick. A viaduct-shaped upper cortex 15–30 μm deep overlies a 25–75 μm zone of anticlinal hyphae; the photobiont layer is 180–205 μm thick, orange-brown above and aeruginous-green below. The medulla measures 35–95 μm and lacks clamp connections or papilliform hyphae. The hymenophore forms a dense, reticulate network of resupinate patches—rounded to elongate, up to 2 mm long and 15 mm broad—with an orange-brown, smooth to slightly felty surface. Sections 90–130 μm thick reveal numerous palisade-like basidioles (19–25 × 4–6 μm) and scattered four-spored basidia (20–30 × 4–6 μm); basidiospores have not been observed. Thin-layer chromatography detected no secondary metabolites in collected specimens.

== Habitat and distribution ==
Cora campestris is known from high-elevation rock outcrops (1,200–2,890 m) in the campos de altitude of south-eastern Brazil, with confirmed records from Morro dos Perdidos, Paraná, and Pico da Bandeira in Espírito Santo. It grows on exposed quartzitic or granitic boulders, usually among bryophytes, within a landscape of low, herb-dominated vegetation interspersed across the southern Atlantic Forest domain.
