= Cora guzmaniana =

Scientific classification
- Kingdom: Fungi
- Division: Basidiomycota
- Class: Agaricomycetes
- Order: Agaricales
- Family: Hygrophoraceae
- Genus: Cora
- Species: C. guzmaniana

Binomial name
- Cora guzmaniana Moncada, R.-E.Pérez & Lücking (2019)

Species of lichen

Cora guzmaniana is a species of basidiolichen in the family Hygrophoraceae. Found in Mexico, it was formally described as a new species in 2019 by Bibiana Moncada, Rosa Emilia Pérez-Pérez, and Robert Lücking. The type specimen was collected from Nuñú (Teposcolola, Oaxaca) at an altitude of 2,616 m (8,583 ft). The lichen is only known from the type locality, where it grows as an epiphyte in patches of Juniperus trees. The specific epithet honours Mexican mycologist Gastón Guzmán, "for his paramount contributions to mycology in Mexico and Latin America as a whole".

== Description ==
Cora guzmaniana is a medium-sized epiphytic lichen that grows on tree trunks, forming foliose patches up to about 10 cm in diameter. It usually consists of 5–10 lobes that are semi-circular in outline and somewhat overlap each other at the centre of the rosette. Each lobe is 1–3 (occasionally up to 4) cm wide and about 1–2 cm long, with moderately frequent branching and short radial fissures near the lobe tips. The thallus is dark grey when fresh, with an olive-grey tinge especially towards the margins, and it does not display any concentric colour zoning on the surface. The lobe edges are distinct and rolled inward (involute), and in life they carry a similar olive-grey shade which turns whitish or pale grey upon drying. Dried specimens thus appear a uniform light grey. The upper surface of C. guzmaniana is uneven and shallowly undulating when moist, becoming nearly flat when dry. Most of the upper surface is smooth (glabrous); a distinctive feature is the presence of faint concentric lines of tiny white setae (bristle-like hairs) on the lobe surface. These short, erect hairs tend to be scattered in thin circular bands, especially near the margins, giving the impression of subtly fuzzy rings on close inspection. The lobe margins themselves are smooth to slightly hairy (some have a thin pilose fringe). On the underside, the lichen lacks a cortex; instead, the white, fibrous medulla is exposed (felty-arachnoid) and appears whitish when fresh, aging to yellowish white in dry condition. Overall, C. guzmaniana in the field looks like a grey, leafy rosette with a mostly smooth surface, dotted with a few fine white hairs near the edges, and a pale underside.

The hymenophore (fertile spore-bearing surface) of Cora guzmaniana is corticioid and arranged in a concentric pattern under the lobes, somewhat similar to that of C. buapana. On the underside of each lobe, it forms rounded to elongated patches of white spore tissue that lie flat against the surface. These patches range from about 1–5 mm in length and are only 0.5–1 mm wide. They tend to be distributed in roughly circular rows following the shape of the lobe, and they can occasionally branch or merge into each other. The hymenophore is smooth and white when fresh, turning a creamy off-white when dried, and its edges are mostly smooth (glabrous) or minutely fuzzy. In cross-section, C. guzmaniana is thicker than many of its relatives, with a layered internal structure: a relatively thick upper cortex (100–200 μm) of loosely arranged fungal hyphae, a thick photobiont layer (100–150 μm) of green cyanobacterial cells, and a medulla (30–50 μm) of loose fungal threads. Sometimes there is an orange-brown pigmented layer above or below the photobiont layer, giving a hint of coloration within the cross-section. The most distinguishing microscopic feature of C. guzmaniana is the abundant coralloid hyphal appendages on the underside medulla. These appendages are short, stubby branches of hyphae, about 5–15 μm long and 5–10 μm thick, that often have tiny spine-like outgrowths (making them spinulose, or spiky). Under the microscope they look like little pieces of coral or tiny antlers with rough surfaces. They are much more robust and elaborately branched than the slender papillae seen in C. buapana. No basidiospores were observed in the studied material (perhaps not yet produced), but basidia (the spore-bearing cells) are present in the hymenophore, confirming its basidiomycete nature.

Cora guzmaniana can be distinguished from other Cora lichens by the combination of its surface setae and its coral-like underside structures. It is closely comparable to Cora buapana in overall size, colour, and habitat; however, C. buapana has a completely hairless lobe surface, whereas C. guzmaniana has those subtle concentric rows of white bristles toward the margins. Additionally, the hyphal appendages in C. guzmaniana are larger, more complex, and covered in tiny spines, in contrast to the smaller, simple, finger-like papillae of C. buapana. Another point of reference is Cora galapagoensis, a species from the Galápagos Islands that also has a grey, medium-sized thallus with a corticioid, concentrically arranged hymenophore and papillate hyphae. C. guzmaniana differs from C. galapagoensis by having an internal layer of pigmented hyphae around the photobiont (giving it a slight brownish tinge in section) and by its hyphal appendages being distinctly coralloid and spinulose rather than simple bumps.
