= Cora zapotecorum =

Scientific classification
- Kingdom: Fungi
- Division: Basidiomycota
- Class: Agaricomycetes
- Order: Agaricales
- Family: Hygrophoraceae
- Genus: Cora
- Species: C. zapotecorum

Binomial name
- Cora zapotecorum Moncada, R.-E.Pérez & Lücking (2019)

Species of lichen

Cora zapotecorum is a species of basidiolichen in the family Hygrophoraceae. Found in Mexico, it was formally described as a new species in 2019 by Bibiana Moncada, Rosa Emilia Pérez-Pérez, and Robert Lücking. The type specimen was collected from Cerro Pelón (Santiago Comaltepec, Oaxaca) in a cloud forest at an altitude of 2,990 m (9,810 ft). Here it grows as an epiphyte on tree and shrub branches, often around bryophytes and liverworts. It occurs sympatrically with some close relatives: Cora benitoana, C. buapana, and C. marusae. The specific epithet zapotecorum refers to the Zapotec peoples, many of whom now live in the area covered by Oaxaca.
