= Cora terrestris =

Scientific classification
- Kingdom: Fungi
- Division: Basidiomycota
- Class: Agaricomycetes
- Order: Agaricales
- Family: Hygrophoraceae
- Genus: Cora
- Species: C. terrestris

Binomial name
- Cora terrestris Dal-Forno, Chaves & Lücking (2016)

Species of lichen

Cora terrestris is a species of basidiolichen in the family Hygrophoraceae. Found in Costa Rica, it was formally described as a new species in 2016 by Manuela Dal Forno, José Luis Chaves, and Robert Lücking. The specific epithet terrestris refers to its terrestrial growth. The lichen occurs in the Cordillera de Talamanca of Costa Rica, where it grows on the ground in páramo bogs and in montane forests. Similar species include Cora celestinoa (Colombia), C. casasolana (Mexico), C. caliginosa (Peru), and C. pichinchensis (Ecuador).
