= Cora auriculeslia =

Scientific classification
- Kingdom: Fungi
- Division: Basidiomycota
- Class: Agaricomycetes
- Order: Agaricales
- Family: Hygrophoraceae
- Genus: Cora
- Species: C. auriculeslia

Binomial name
- Cora auriculeslia B.Moncada, Yánez-Ayabaca & Lücking (2016)

Species of lichen

Cora auriculeslia is a species of basidiolichen in the family Hygrophoraceae. It was formally described as a new species in 2016 by Bibiana Moncada, Alba Yánez-Ayabaca, and Robert Lücking. The specific epithet auriculeslia alludes to the ear-shaped lobes of the lichen, and adds the second name of the mycologist David Leslie Hawksworth. It is known to occur only from the type locality near Quito in Ecuador, where it grows on the ground in the shade.

== Taxonomy ==
Cora auriculeslia is a basidiolichen in the family Hygrophoraceae (order Agaricales). It was described in 2016 by Robert Lücking, Bibiana Moncada, and Dayvid Yánez-Ayabaca from material collected in the páramo of La Virgen, near Papallacta, Ecuador. The epithet combines a reference to the lichen's ear-shaped lobes (Latin auricula, 'little ear') with David Hawksworth's second forename, Leslie. Molecular data from the internal transcribed spacer region show that C. auriculeslia is the closest known relative of C. squamiformis, together forming a clade that also includes C. caliginosa. Despite this kinship, the Ecuadorian taxon differs consistently in its lighter olive-grey pigmentation, thinner margins, and mesic páramo ecology.

== Description ==
The thallus of Cora auriculeslia is terricolous and macrosquamulose (composed of large, scale-like lobes) and grows tightly among moss cushions. A single rosette reaches up to 3 cm across and contains five to fifteen strongly bent, semicircular lobes 0.5–1 cm wide and 0.3–0.7 cm long. Fresh lobes are light olive-grey and show faint concentric colour bands; the rolled-in (involute) margins are thick, light grey, and slightly roughened but otherwise glabrous. As the thallus dries, both surfaces remain grey and wrinkled (rugose).

In vertical section the thallus is 400–500 micrometres (μm) thick. A compact upper cortex 20–30 μm deep overlies a 100–150 μm photobiont zone (orange-brown above, aeruginous-green below). The medulla, 200–250 μm thick, is compacted and hydrophobic directly beneath the algal layer but becomes loose towards the underside; no clamp connections or papillate hyphae are present. A hymenophore has not been observed in any of the available material, and thin-layer chromatography revealed no detectable secondary metabolites.

== Habitat and distribution ==
As of its original publication, Cora auriculeslia was known only from wet páramo above 3,000 m elevation near Papallacta, Napo Province, Ecuador. It grows close to the ground between mosses in shaded microhabitats where persistent mist, frequent rainfall, and rapid temperature fluctuations typify the high-Andean environment.
