= Cora pseudocorani =

Scientific classification
- Kingdom: Fungi
- Division: Basidiomycota
- Class: Agaricomycetes
- Order: Agaricales
- Family: Hygrophoraceae
- Genus: Cora
- Species: C. pseudocorani

Binomial name
- Cora pseudocorani Lücking, E.Morales & Dal-Forno (2016)

Species of lichen

Cora pseudocorani is a species of basidiolichen in the family Hygrophoraceae. Found in Bolivia, it was formally described as a new species in 2016 by Robert Lücking Eduardo Morales, and Manuela Dal Forno. The specific epithet pseudocorani refers to its resemblance to Cora corani, another terrestrial species found at the same location. Cora pseudocorani is only known to occur at the type locality, the Corani Lake reservoir in Chapare Province, Cochabamba. Here the lichen grows on the ground over bryophytes.
