= Cora undulata =

Scientific classification
- Kingdom: Fungi
- Division: Basidiomycota
- Class: Agaricomycetes
- Order: Agaricales
- Family: Hygrophoraceae
- Genus: Cora
- Species: C. undulata

Binomial name
- Cora undulata L.Y.Vargas, B.Moncada & Lücking (2014)

Species of lichen

Cora undulata is a rare species of basidiolichen in the family Hygrophoraceae. It is found in Colombia. Its dark olive-green thalli are foliose, measuring up to 9 cm and comprising 5 to 15 semicircular lobes. This lichen gets its name from the wavy, rippled surface of its lobes and is characterised by whitish to pale orange-brown fertile patches on its underside that form rings mirroring the ridges above. Described as new to science in 2014 from a single location in Casanare Department at 1400 metres elevation, it is currently known only from its type locality where it grows on rocks among mosses in semi-exposed habitats.

== Taxonomy ==
The lichen was formally described as a new species in 2014 by Leidy Yasmín Vargas, Bibiana Moncada, and Robert Lücking. The type specimen was collected in Finca El Paraiso (Vereda Centro Sur, Chámeza) at an elevation of 1,400 m (4,600 ft). The lichen is only known to occur at the type locality, where it grows on rocks, often associated with bryophytes in semi-exposed microhabitats. The specific epithet undulata refers to the undulate (wavy) surface of the lobes.

== Description ==
Cora undulata grows as a leaf-like (foliose) lichen directly on bare rock or nestled among mosses that coat rock faces. A single thallus— the integrated body formed by fungal and cyanobacterial partners—can reach about 9 cm in diameter and consists of five to fifteen semicircular lobes. Each lobe is 1–3 cm wide and 1–2 cm long, often forking once or twice; the seams (sutures) where branches divide are faint or absent. When the lichen is moist the upper surface is a deep olive-green, drying to a whitish grey in herbarium specimens. It is smooth yet marked by fine concentric ridges that give a gently rippled appearance, and its edges are broadly even rather than toothed. The underside is plain white whether wet or dry.

A vertical section through a lobe reveals three main tissue layers with a combined thickness of about 250–350 micrometres (μm). The outer cortex (50–100 μm) is a protective skin of fungal threads (hyphae) arranged parallel to the surface above and roughly perpendicular below. Beneath this, the photobiont layer (140–180 μm) houses the cyanobacterial partner in tight spherical clusters 30–40 μm across. Each cyanobacterial cell, 12–18 μm in diameter and vivid emerald-green, is wrapped in a sheath of interlocking fungal cells, while additional hyphae 5–7 μm thick weave through the layer. The innermost medulla (60–100 μm) is a looser mesh of mainly parallel hyphae that provides structural support.

Unlike many lichens, C. undulata bears its fertile tissue (the hymenophore) on the underside. It appears as whitish to pale orange-brown, felt-like patches 1–2 mm long and up to 0.4 mm wide, arranged in rings that mirror the ridges on the upper surface. In section these patches are 100–150 μm thick and consist of a basal brick-like layer (paraplectenchyma) topped by upright cylindrical hyphae. No mature basidia or spores have yet been observed, and thin-layer chromatography detects no secondary metabolites ( lichen products), so the species is identified chiefly by its distinctive shape, colour changes and underside patches.
