= Cora suturifera =

Scientific classification
- Kingdom: Fungi
- Division: Basidiomycota
- Class: Agaricomycetes
- Order: Agaricales
- Family: Hygrophoraceae
- Genus: Cora
- Species: C. suturifera

Binomial name
- Cora suturifera Nugra, Besal & Lücking (2016)

Species of lichen

Cora suturifera is a species of basidiolichen in the family Hygrophoraceae. Found in Ecuador, it was formally described as a new species in 2016 by Freddy Nugra, Betty Besal, and Robert Lücking The specific epithet suturifera refers to the seams (sutures) that connect the lobes after branching. The lichen is only known to occur at the type locality in the Kutukú-Shaimi Protection Forest (Taisha, Morona-Santiago Province). Here, in a submontane rainforest, it grows as an epiphyte on twigs. Similar species include Cora canari, C. hafecesweorthensis, and C. imi.
