= Cora accipiter =

Scientific classification
- Kingdom: Fungi
- Division: Basidiomycota
- Class: Agaricomycetes
- Order: Agaricales
- Family: Hygrophoraceae
- Genus: Cora
- Species: C. accipiter

Binomial name
- Cora accipiter B.Moncada, Madriñán & Lücking (2016)

Species of lichen

Cora accipiter is a species of basidiolichen in the family Hygrophoraceae. It was formally described as a new species in 2016 by Bibiana Moncada, Santiago Madriñán, and Robert Lücking. The specific epithet, which refers to hawks of the genus Accipiter, alludes to the wing-shaped lobes of the lichen, and also honours mycologist David Leslie Hawksworth. The lichen is found in South America, where it grows in the wet páramo regions of the northern Andes. Closely related species include C. cyphellifera and C. arachnoidea.

== Taxonomy ==
Cora accipiter is a basidiolichen in the family Hygrophoraceae (order Agaricales). It was formally described in 2016 by Bibiana Moncada, Manuel Madriñán, and Robert Lücking from material collected in the páramo of Chingaza in the eastern cordillera of Colombia. The epithet, accipiter—used as a noun in apposition—draws an analogy between the lichen's fan- or wing-shaped lobes and the wings of hawks in the genus Accipiter. Internal transcribed spacer rDNA sequences from the holotype and numerous paratypes place the species in the Cora arachnoidea–cyphellifera clade, but an expanded data set distinguishes C. accipiter from its close relatives C. arachnoidea and C. cyphellifera.

== Description ==
The thallus is somewhat epiphytic, forming a foliose carpet up to 20 cm across at the bases or lower stems of páramo shrubs, or over grasses and other herbaceous plants. It comprises 5–25 overlapping, fan- to wing-shaped lobes, each 2–3 cm wide and 1–3 cm long. Long, radial branching sutures frequently split, leaving the lobes laterally truncated and giving them a ragged "wing" outline. Fresh upper surfaces are light olive to olive-brown with a faint concentric colour zoning; the thin, rolled-in (involute) margins are pale and finely pilose. When dry, the surface becomes distinctly undulate-rugose and shows concentric bands of short, cobweb-like (arachnoid) tomentum. The lower surface lacks a cortex (it is ecorticate) and exposes a whitish-to-cream felty medulla.

In section the thallus is 400–500 micrometres (μm) thick. The upper cortex is 20–40 μm thick and viaduct-shaped, underlain by a 70–100 μm zone of spaced anticlinal hyphae; stout setae (200–400 μm long, 30–40 μm wide at the base) emerge through this layer. The algal layer is 100–200 μm thick, orange-brown above and bluish-green below. A 100–150 μm hydrophobic medulla completes the section; neither clamp connections nor papillate hyphae are present. The fertile surface forms pale yellow-brown, resupinate patches 0.5–2 mm long and 1–5 mm broad that may anastomose into diffuse, concentric lines. Its hymenium (60–80 μm) contains abundant palisade-like basidioles (20–30 × 5–7 μm) and scattered four-spored basidia (25–35 × 5–7 μm); basidiospores have not been observed. Thin-layer chromatography revealed no detectable secondary metabolites.

== Habitat and distribution ==
Cora accipiter was originally documented from the wet páramo ecosystems of the northern Andes of Colombia and Venezuela, at elevations of roughly 3,200–3,730 m. It grows epiphytically at the bases and lower stems of páramo shrubs—or immediately above the ground on grasses and other low herbs—where frequent mist, strong winds, and intense ultraviolet radiation prevail. It was later recorded in the El Ángel páramo of Ecuador at about 3950 m elevation.
