= Cora fimbriata =

Scientific classification
- Kingdom: Fungi
- Division: Basidiomycota
- Class: Agaricomycetes
- Order: Agaricales
- Family: Hygrophoraceae
- Genus: Cora
- Species: C. fimbriata

Binomial name
- Cora fimbriata L.Vargas, Moncada & Lücking (2014)

Species of lichen

Cora fimbriata is a rare species of basidiolichen in the family Hygrophoraceae. It is found in Colombia. This small lichen forms leaf-like rosettes up to 3 cm across that grow on tree bark, distinguished by distinctive white hair-like fringes along the edges of its lobes that give the species its name. Described as new to science in 2014 from a single location in Casanare Department at 1450 metres elevation, it is currently known only from its type locality where it grows among mosses in partially shaded microhabitats.

== Taxonomy ==
The lichen was formally described as a new species in 2014 by Leidy Yasmín Vargas, Bibiana Moncada, and Robert Lücking. The type was collected in Finca El Paraiso (Vereda Centro Sur, Chámeza) at an altitude of 1,450 m (4,760 ft). It is only known to occur at the type locality, where it grows on tree bark in association with bryophytes in partially exposed microhabitats. The specific epithet fimbriata refers to the cilia that are fringed on the margins of the lobes.

== Description ==
Cora fimbriata forms small, leaf-like rosettes that cling to tree bark in the humid spaces between moss cushions. Each thallus (the overall lichen body) is seldom more than 3 cm across and typically consists of one to three semicircular lobes. Individual lobes measure 1–2.5 cm in width and 1–1.5 cm in length; they fork once to three times, and fine "sutures" run between the branches like seams in fabric. When moist the upper surface is a dark olive-grey, drying to a plain grey in the herbarium. It is smooth to the touch but shows faint concentric wrinkles. Along the lobe margins and within the sutures the lichen bears a fringe of short, white cilia—fine, hair-like projections that give the species its name. The lower surface is patterned with alternating white and grey rings, a feature that remains visible whether the specimen is fresh or dry.

A thin vertical slice through a lobe reveals a three-layered structure 0.22–0.30 mm thick. The outer cortex, measuring 110–130 micrometres (μm) thick, acts like a protective skin; its fungal threads (hyphae) are arranged first parallel to the surface (periclinal) and then, in a deeper sub-layer, roughly perpendicular (anticlinal). Beneath lies the photobiont layer (75–100 μm), where cyanobacteria occur in tight emerald-green clusters 25–30 μm across. Each bacterial cell is 10–15 μm wide and enveloped by a sheath of interlocking fungal cells, with additional hyphae 5–7 μm thick weaving through the layer. The innermost medulla (55–75 μm) is a looser mesh of mostly periclinal hyphae 1–3 μm in diameter. No hymenophore—the spore-bearing tissue typical of many basidiolichens—has yet been observed in this species, and thin-layer chromatography detects no secondary metabolites in the thallus.
