= Cora arachnodavidea =

Scientific classification
- Kingdom: Fungi
- Division: Basidiomycota
- Class: Agaricomycetes
- Order: Agaricales
- Family: Hygrophoraceae
- Genus: Cora
- Species: C. arachnodavidea

Binomial name
- Cora arachnodavidea B.Moncada, Dal-Forno & Lücking (2016)

Species of lichen

Cora arachnodavidea is a species of basidiolichen in the family Hygrophoraceae. It was formally described as a new species in 2016 by Bibiana Moncada, Manuela Dal Forno, and Robert Lücking. The specific epithet alludes to the arachnoid surface of the thallus, and also refers to mycologist David Leslie Hawksworth. The lichen is only known to occur in the páramo of Guasca in Colombia, where it grows on the ground in sheltered places between plants and bryophytes.

== Taxonomy ==
Cora arachnodavidea is a basidiolichen in the family Hygrophoraceae (order Agaricales). It was formally described in 2016 by Bibiana Moncada, Manuela Dal Forno, and Robert Lücking from material collected in the páramo of Guasca, near Bogotá, Colombia. The epithet combines the lichen's densely arachnoid (cob-webbed) upper surface with the given name of lichenologist David Leslie Hawksworth—itself derived from the Hebrew "beloved". ITS rDNA data place the species in the same broad clade as C. cyphellifera and C. arachnoidea, but phylogenetic analyses indicate that C. arachnodavidea and the glabrous C. cyphellifera form an unsupported sister pair, collectively distinct from the epiphytic C. arachnoidea.

== Description ==
The thallus is terrestrial, forming a foliose rosette up to 7 cm across on soil between bryophytes or at plant bases. It consists of three to five semicircular lobes, each 1–3 cm long and wide, sparsely branched and lacking obvious radial sutures. Fresh lobes are olive-brown to olive-grey with pale concentric zones; rolled-in (involute) margins bear conspicuous white pilose hairs. When dry the upper surface becomes rugose and broadly arachnoid, while the lower surface—lacking a cortex (it is ecorticate)—shows a whitish, felty medulla.

In section the thallus is 350–450 micrometres (μm) thick. A diffusely viaduct-shaped upper cortex (30–50 μm) overlies a 100–150 μm zone of spaced, anticlinal hyphae. Tufts of agglutinated hyphae form stout setae, 200–300 μm long and 30–50 μm broad at the base. The photobiont layer is 100–200 μm thick (orange-brown above, olive-green below). The photobiont is Rhizonema andinum, a filamentous cyanobacterium in the family Nostocaceae. The medulla is 70–100 μm thick and emits coralloid hyphae 3–5 μm wide. No clamp connections are present.

The hymenophore is cyphelloid: rounded to irregular, sessile depressions 3–5 mm in diameter with cream- to pale orange-brown surfaces and felty, involute margins. Sections show a 200–250 μm thick structure supported by a thickened medullary base; the hymenium contains abundant palisade-like basidioles (40–50 × 5–7 μm) and scattered four-spored basidia (25–35 × 5–7 μm). Basidiospores have yet to be observed, and thin-layer chromatography has detected no secondary metabolites.

== Habitat and distribution ==
The species is known only from the páramo of Guasca, Cundinamarca Department, Colombia (roughly 3,220 m elevation). It grows on the ground in lightly sheltered microsites among bryophytes and herbaceous plants, where frequent mist and rapid drying cycles characterise the high-Andean environment.
