= Cora marusae =

Scientific classification
- Kingdom: Fungi
- Division: Basidiomycota
- Class: Agaricomycetes
- Order: Agaricales
- Family: Hygrophoraceae
- Genus: Cora
- Species: C. marusae

Binomial name
- Cora marusae Moncada, R.-E.Pérez & Lücking (2019)

Species of lichen

Cora marusae is a species of basidiolichen in the family Hygrophoraceae. Found in Mexico, it was formally described as a new species in 2019 by Bibiana Moncada, Rosa Emilia Pérez-Pérez, and Robert Lücking. The type specimen was collected on the Cerro Las Antenas (Santiago Comaltepec, Oaxaca) in a cloud forest at an altitude of 2,190 m (7,190 ft). Here it grows as an epiphyte on tree trunks, often sympatrically with Cora benitoana and C. buapana. The specific epithet marusae honours Mexican lichenologist María de los Ángeles Herrera-Campos, a friend and colleague of the authors.
