= Cora hochesuordensis =

Scientific classification
- Kingdom: Fungi
- Division: Basidiomycota
- Class: Agaricomycetes
- Order: Agaricales
- Family: Hygrophoraceae
- Genus: Cora
- Species: C. hochesuordensis

Binomial name
- Cora hochesuordensis Lücking, E.Morales & Dal-Forno (2016)

Species of lichen

Cora hochesuordensis is a species of basidiolichen in the family Hygrophoraceae. Found in Bolivia, it was formally described as a new species in 2016 by Robert Lücking, Eduardo Morales, and Manuela Dal Forno. The specific epithet hochesuordensis refers to the Anglo-Saxon name Hochesuorde (in Nottinghamshire), one of two places in England from which the surname Hawksworth is derived, and a tribute to mycologist David Leslie Hawksworth. The lichen is only known from the type locality in Corani Lake reservoir (Cochabamba), where it grows as an epiphyte on shrub twigs.
