= Cora cuzcoensis =

Scientific classification
- Kingdom: Fungi
- Division: Basidiomycota
- Class: Agaricomycetes
- Order: Agaricales
- Family: Hygrophoraceae
- Genus: Cora
- Species: C. cuzcoensis

Binomial name
- Cora cuzcoensis Holgado, Rivas Plata & Perlmutter (2016)

Species of lichen

Cora cuzcoensis is a species of basidiolichen in the family Hygrophoraceae. Found in Peru, it was formally described as a new species in 2016 by María Holgado-Rojas, Eimy Rivas-Plata, and Gary Perlmutter. The specific epithet cuzcoensis refers to the type locality in the Cusco Province, near Machu Picchu. It is only known to occur here, where it grows on the ground near a disturbed rainforest. Similar in appearance (but not closely related) is Cora caliginosa.
