= Cora boleslia =

Scientific classification
- Kingdom: Fungi
- Division: Basidiomycota
- Class: Agaricomycetes
- Order: Agaricales
- Family: Hygrophoraceae
- Genus: Cora
- Species: C. boleslia

Binomial name
- Cora boleslia Lücking, E.Morales & Dal-Forno (2016)

Species of lichen

Cora boleslia is a rare species of basidiolichen in the family Hygrophoraceae. It was formally described as a new species in 2016 by Robert Lücking, Eduardo Morales, and Manuela Dal Forno. The specific epithet boleslia refers to the type locality in Bolivia as well as the second name of the mycologist David Leslie Hawksworth. The lichen is known to occur only in mountainous rainforests of the central Andes, where it grows on twigs in partial shade.

== Taxonomy ==
Cora boleslia is a basidiolichen in the family Hygrophoraceae (order Agaricales). It was described in 2016 by Robert Lücking, Eddy Morales, and Manuela Dal Forno from a single collection made near Incachaca in the Cochabamba region of Bolivia's Central Andes. The epithet merges the country of origin (BOLivia) with David Hawksworth's middle name, Leslie. Phylogenetic analyses based on ITS sequences show that the species forms its own well-supported lineage with a placement sister to, but distinct from, C. aspera. This genetic singularity reinforces the idea that Andean uplift has driven extensive diversification within the genus.

== Description ==
The thallus of Cora boleslia is epiphytic and foliose, forming rosettes up to 5 cm across on shaded twigs. It comprises two to five semicircular lobes, 1–2 cm wide and 0.7–1.5 cm long, which remain unbranched and lack radial sutures. When fresh the upper surface is a uniform aeruginous green, even and glabrous, with thin, inward-rolled (involute) margins that soon fade to grey in the herbarium; no concentric undulations develop. Drying renders the surface gently wrinkled (rugose. The lower face lacks a cortex (it is ecorticate) and shows a whitish, felty-arachnoid medulla.

Vertical sections are 150–200 micrometres (μm) thick. A viaduct-shaped upper cortex, 20–30 μm deep, overlies a 30–50 μm zone of loosely anticlinal hyphae. The photobiont layer, 50–80 μm thick, is aeruginous throughout, while the medulla, 20–50 μm, is hydrophobic and bears numerous papilliform-to-coralloid hyphae 2–3 μm wide. Clamp connections are absent, and no hymenophore was observed in the available material. Thin-layer chromatography detected no secondary metabolites.

== Habitat and distribution ==
Cora boleslia is known only from the type locality in humid montane rainforest at about 2,200 m elevation in the Central Andes of Bolivia. It grows epiphytically on slender twigs under partial shade, where persistent cloud cover, high moisture, and moderate temperatures prevail. The even, hydrophobic thallus surface may aid rapid shedding of water in these mist-laden forests, while the absence of concentric undulations distinguishes it from similarly coloured Andean members of the genus. Cora boleslia is one of 11 Cora species that have been documented to occur in Bolivia.
