= Cora pikynasa =

Scientific classification
- Kingdom: Fungi
- Division: Basidiomycota
- Class: Agaricomycetes
- Order: Agaricales
- Family: Hygrophoraceae
- Genus: Cora
- Species: C. pikynasa

Binomial name
- Cora pikynasa J.-M.Torres, B.Moncada & Lücking (2016)

Species of lichen

Cora pikynasa is a species of basidiolichen in the family Hygrophoraceae. Found in Colombia, it was formally described as a new species in 2016 by Jean-Marc Torres, Bibiana Moncada, and Robert Lücking. The specific epithet pikynasa derives from pi'ky nasa, a Nasa indigenous word meaning "community work", which references the help given to the authors by the Nasa people in gaining access to the collection site. The lichen is known to occur only at the type locality in the Vereda Territorios Nacionales (Rioblanco, Tolima), which is at an altitude of 3,212 m (10,538 ft). Here it grows as an epiphyte on páramo shrubs.
