= Cora totonacorum =

Scientific classification
- Kingdom: Fungi
- Division: Basidiomycota
- Class: Agaricomycetes
- Order: Agaricales
- Family: Hygrophoraceae
- Genus: Cora
- Species: C. totonacorum

Binomial name
- Cora totonacorum Moncada, R.-E.Pérez & Lücking (2019)

Species of lichen

Cora totonacorum is a species of basidiolichen in the family Hygrophoraceae. Found in Mexico, it was formally described as a new species in 2019 by Bibiana Moncada, Rosa Emilia Pérez-Pérez, and Robert Lücking. The type specimen was collected in La Cortadura Ecological Reserve (Coatepec, Veracruz), in a cloud forest at an altitude of 2,088 m (6,850 ft). The lichen is only known to occur at the type locality, where it grows as an epiphyte on branches of Baccharis. Cora totonacorum grows in close association with mosses, liverworts, and other lichens. It is sympatric with Cora lawreyana. The specific epithet totonacorum refers to the Totonac people, who live in the states of Veracruz, Puebla, and Hidalgo, and who were important vanilla producers historically.
