= Cora paraciferrii =

Scientific classification
- Kingdom: Fungi
- Division: Basidiomycota
- Class: Agaricomycetes
- Order: Agaricales
- Family: Hygrophoraceae
- Genus: Cora
- Species: C. paraciferrii

Binomial name
- Cora paraciferrii Lücking, B.Moncada & J.E.Hern. (2016)

Species of lichen

Cora paraciferrii is a species of basidiolichen in the family Hygrophoraceae. Found in Colombia, it was formally described as a new species in 2016 by Robert Lücking, Bibiana Moncada, and Jesús Hernández Marin. The specific epithet paraciferrii refers to the sister group relationship the species has with what used to be called Cora ciferrii. The lichen occurs at elevations above 3,000 m (9,800 ft) in the northern Andes of Colombia and Venezuela, where it grows in wet páramo on the ground with bryophytes.
