= Cora applanata =

Scientific classification
- Kingdom: Fungi
- Division: Basidiomycota
- Class: Agaricomycetes
- Order: Agaricales
- Family: Hygrophoraceae
- Genus: Cora
- Species: C. applanata

Binomial name
- Cora applanata B.Moncada, Soto-Medina & Lücking (2016)

Species of lichen

Cora applanata is a species of basidiolichen in the family Hygrophoraceae. It was formally described as a new species in 2016 by Bibiana Moncada, Edier Soto-Medina, and Robert Lücking. The specific epithet refers to its applanate (flattened) thallus. The lichen is widely distributed in tropical montane areas of the northern Andes, where it grows on soil along open road banks and on land slides.

== Taxonomy ==
Cora applanata is a basidiolichen in the family Hygrophoraceae (order Agaricales). It was formally described in 2016 by Bibiana Moncada, Edier Soto-Medina, and Robert Lücking on the basis of material collected in the Western Cordillera of Colombia. The specific epithet, applanata, refers to the characteristically flattened, ground-hugging thallus. Internal transcribed spacer rDNA sequences from the type and numerous paratypes place the species in the Cora reticulifera clade, a group of soil-dwelling taxa with completely adnate lobes and a reticulate hymenophore. Within this clade, C. applanata is the northern-Andean representative; its closest relatives occur further south in Bolivia and south-eastern Brazil.

== Description ==
The lichen forms a foliose (leaf-like) rosette firmly attached to bare soil (terricolous and adnate). A single thallus may reach about 10 cm across, yet many thalli often coalesce to carpet large patches of roadside banks or landslides. Each thallus is composed of three to seven semicircular lobes, 1–2 cm wide and long. When fresh the upper surface is olive-green to dark olive-grey and almost flat; on drying it quickly develops striking concentric colour rings that remain visible in the herbarium. The thin, rolled-in (involute) lobe margins are whitish and usually glabrous, though minute papillae may occur. The lower surface lacks a protective outer skin (ecorticate) and instead shows the felt-like medulla, initially grey and turning whitish-grey once dried.

In cross-section the thallus is 150–200 micrometres (μm) thick, with a compact upper cortex (10–20 μm), a photobiont layer packed with green algal cells (70–130 μm), and a hydrophobic medulla (30–50 μm). The photobiont partner is of the Rhizonema interruptum lineage. No clamp connections or papillate hyphae have been observed. The fertile surface (hymenophore) develops as cream-coloured, resupinate patches 0.3–1 mm wide that often fuse into irregular, faintly concentric lines. Sections reveal a hymenium 80–100 μm thick containing abundant basidioles (20–25 × 4–6 μm) and scattered 4-spored basidia (25–35 × 4–6 μm); basidiospores have not been seen. Thin-layer chromatography detects no secondary metabolites.

== Habitat and distribution ==
Cora applanata is widespread in the northern Andes of Colombia and Ecuador, with confirmed records from the Sierra de Carchi in the north to the Cordillera Oriental of Cundinamarca and the cloud forests of Azuay in the south. It occupies tropical-montane and páramo zones between roughly 1,300 and 3,700 m elevation. The lichen favours disturbed, fully exposed habitats—particularly open road verges, landslides, and other soil banks—where its flattened form sits flush with the substrate and withstands alternating wet and rapidly drying conditions. After rainfall the thallus dries within minutes, leaving the concentric rings visible even under humid skies, a feature that likely mitigates prolonged saturation and promotes gas exchange in these high-moisture environments.
