= Cora barbulata =

Scientific classification
- Kingdom: Fungi
- Division: Basidiomycota
- Class: Agaricomycetes
- Order: Agaricales
- Family: Hygrophoraceae
- Genus: Cora
- Species: C. barbulata

Binomial name
- Cora barbulata Lücking, Dal-Forno & Lawrey (2015)

Species of lichen

Cora barbulata is a species of basidiolichen in the family Hygrophoraceae. Found in Costa Rica, it was formally described as a new species in 2015 by Robert Lücking, Manuela Dal-Forno, and James Lawrey. The type specimen was collected in the Los Santos Forest Reserve at an altitude of about 3,400 m (11,200 ft). The lichen occurs in upper montane cloud forests in the Costa Rican Cordillera de Talamanca where it grows as an epiphyte on páramo shrubs. The specific epithet barbulata refers to the beard-like concentric tomentose (woolly) rings of the upper lobe surfaces. Cora aspera, found in Central and South America, is somewhat similar in appearance and ecology, but is not closely related to C. barbulata.
