= Cora arcabucana =

Scientific classification
- Kingdom: Fungi
- Division: Basidiomycota
- Class: Agaricomycetes
- Order: Agaricales
- Family: Hygrophoraceae
- Genus: Cora
- Species: C. arcabucana

Binomial name
- Cora arcabucana Dal-Forno, C.Rodríguez & Lücking (2016)

Species of lichen

Cora arcabucana is a species of basidiolichen in the family Hygrophoraceae. It was formally described as a new species in 2016 by Manuela Dal Forno, Camilo Rodríguez, and Robert Lücking. The specific epithet arcabucana refers to the type locality in the Arcabuco, (Boyacá, Colombia). The lichen grows on the twigs of shrubs and small trees in montane rainforests at altitudes between 2,500 and 3,000 m (8,200 and 9,800 ft). Cora davidia is a closely related species.

== Taxonomy ==
Cora arcabucana is a basidiolichen in the family Hygrophoraceae (order Agaricales). It was described in 2016 by Bibiana Moncada, Camila Rodríguez, and Robert Lücking from material collected near the municipality of Arcabuco in the Boyacá highlands of Colombia. The specific epithet, arcabucana, commemorates this type locality. ITS rDNA data position the species in a well-supported subclade that also contains C. davidia and C. garagoa, but morphological and ecological differences—particularly its aeruginous-green thallus, sparse soredia, and narrower, more branched papillae—support its recognition as a separate taxon.

== Description ==
The thallus is epiphytic and foliose, forming rosettes up to 3 cm across on twigs and small branches, usually overlying mats of bryophytes. It consists of three to seven semicircular, adjacent to sub-imbricate lobes, each 0.5–2 cm long and wide. Lobes branch freely, ending in numerous terminal lobules separated by short radial sutures. When fresh the upper surface is aeruginous green and even; as it dries, faint rugosity appears but no concentric colour bands develop. The rolled-in (involute) margins are greenish-grey, glabrous to sparsely pilose, and bear scattered soredia. The lower surface lacks a cortex (ecorticate) and shows a felty-arachnoid medulla that is greenish-grey when fresh, turning white-grey in the herbarium.

Cross-sections are 170–250 micrometres (μm) thick. The upper cortex, 70–100 μm, is viaduct-shaped and overlies an 80–100 μm layer of anticlinal hyphae; both zones are composed of 4–6 μm-wide hyphae. The photobiont layer, 50–100 μm thick, is aeruginous green, and the medulla, 30–50 μm thick, is strongly hydrophobic and bears numerous branched, coralloid papillae 2–3 μm wide; clamp connections are absent. The hymenophore is corticioid and completely adnate, forming confluent, cream-white patches that can cover up to 2 × 10 mm on the lower surface. Sections (20–30 μm thick) show a palisade of basidioles (20–30 × 5–6 μm) and scattered four-spored basidia (25–35 × 5–6 μm); basidiospores have not been seen. Thin-layer chromatography detected no secondary metabolites.

== Habitat and distribution ==
Cora arcabucana occurs in montane rainforest between 2,500 and 3,000 m elevation on the northern Andes of Colombia. It grows epiphytically on shaded to semi-exposed twigs of shrubs and small trees, often in association with bryophyte mats. Its strongly hydrophobic medulla and adnate, confluent hymenophore may facilitate rapid shedding of excess moisture in these cool, humid forests.
