= Cora quillacinga =

Scientific classification
- Kingdom: Fungi
- Division: Basidiomycota
- Class: Agaricomycetes
- Order: Agaricales
- Family: Hygrophoraceae
- Genus: Cora
- Species: C. quillacinga

Binomial name
- Cora quillacinga B.Moncada, F.Ortega & Lücking (2016)

Species of lichen

Cora quillacinga is a species of basidiolichen in the family Hygrophoraceae. Found in southern Colombia, it was formally described as a new species in 2016 by Bibiana Moncada, Francisco Ortega, and Robert Lücking. The specific epithet refers to the indigenous Quillacinga people. The lichen is known to occur only at the type locality in wet páramo near Pasto, where it grows on dead plant material. Cora minutula is indistinguishable from C. quillacinga by appearance alone, but it is not closely related.
