= Cora putumayensis =

Scientific classification
- Kingdom: Fungi
- Division: Basidiomycota
- Class: Agaricomycetes
- Order: Agaricales
- Family: Hygrophoraceae
- Genus: Cora
- Species: C. putumayensis

Binomial name
- Cora putumayensis L.J.Arias, B.Moncada & Lücking (2016)

Species of lichen

Cora putumayensis is a species of basidiolichen in the family Hygrophoraceae. Found in Colombia, it was formally described as a new species in 2016 by Laura Juliana Arias, Bibiana Moncada, and Robert Lücking. The specific epithet putumayensis refers to Putumayo Department, where the type locality is. Here, on the road from Mocoa to San Francisco, the lichen was found growing as an epiphyte on tree branches in a mountainous rainforest. It is somewhat similar in appearance to the Bolivian species Cora maxima.
