= Cora subdavicrinita =

Scientific classification
- Kingdom: Fungi
- Division: Basidiomycota
- Class: Agaricomycetes
- Order: Agaricales
- Family: Hygrophoraceae
- Genus: Cora
- Species: C. subdavicrinita

Binomial name
- Cora subdavicrinita B.Moncada, J.A.Molina & Lücking (2016)

Species of lichen

Cora subdavicrinita is a species of basidiolichen in the family Hygrophoraceae. Found in South America, it was formally described as a new species in 2016 by Bibiana Moncada, Jorge Alberto Molina, and Robert Lücking. The specific epithet subdavicrinita refers to its resemblance to Cora davicrinita. The lichen is found in the northern Andes of Colombia and Ecuador, where it occurs at elevations greater than 3,000 m (9,800 ft) in wet páramo. Here it grows as an epiphyte on shrubs with bryophytes and other lichens. Its morphologically similar namesake, C. crinita, is not closely related, occurring in a different clade in genus Cora.
