= Cora hymenocarpa =

Scientific classification
- Kingdom: Fungi
- Division: Basidiomycota
- Class: Agaricomycetes
- Order: Agaricales
- Family: Hygrophoraceae
- Genus: Cora
- Species: C. hymenocarpa

Binomial name
- Cora hymenocarpa Lücking, Chaves & Lawrey (2016)

Species of lichen

Cora hymenocarpa is a species of basidiolichen in the family Hygrophoraceae. Found in Costa Rica, it was formally described as a new species in 2016 by Robert Lücking, José Luis Chaves, and James D. Lawrey. The specific epithet hymenocarpa refers to the "strongly flattened, emarginate hymenophore". Cora hymenocarpa grows in the tropical rainforests of Costa Rica as an epiphyte on the somewhat shaded branches and twigs of shrubs and trees. The Colombian species Cora hafecesweorthensis is similar in appearance but is not closely related phylogenetically.
