= Cora itabaiana =

Scientific classification
- Kingdom: Fungi
- Division: Basidiomycota
- Class: Agaricomycetes
- Order: Agaricales
- Family: Hygrophoraceae
- Genus: Cora
- Species: C. itabaiana

Binomial name
- Cora itabaiana Dal-Forno, Aptroot & M.Cáceres (2016)

Species of lichen

Cora itabaiana is a species of basidiolichen in the family Hygrophoraceae. Found in northeastern Brazil, it was formally described as a new species in 2016 by Manuela Dal Forno, André Aptroot, and Marcela Cáceres. The specific epithet itabaiana indicates the type locality, Serra de Itabaiana (State of Sergipe), the only place the lichen has been scientifically documented. Here, in an Atlantic Forest ecoregion, it grows as an epiphyte.
