= Cora santacruzensis =

Scientific classification
- Kingdom: Fungi
- Division: Basidiomycota
- Class: Agaricomycetes
- Order: Agaricales
- Family: Hygrophoraceae
- Genus: Cora
- Species: C. santacruzensis

Binomial name
- Cora santacruzensis Dal-Forno, Bungartz & Yánez-Ayabaca (2016)

Species of lichen

Cora santacruzensis is a species of basidiolichen in the family Hygrophoraceae. Found in the Galapagos, it was formally described as a new species in 2016 by Manuela Dal Forno, Frank Bungartz, and Alba Yánez-Ayabaca. The specific epithet santacruzensis refers to Santa Cruz Island, the type locality where the lichen was first documented scientifically. Here it was found at an abandoned farm behind El Puntudo, where it was growing on a shaded branch of an avocado tree (Persea americana). A paratype specimen was collected from a Cinchona tree (Cinchona pubescens). The lichen is one of two presumably endemic Cora species found on the Galapagos; the other is Cora glabrata.
