= Cora timucua =

Conservation status
- Critically endangered, possibly extinct (IUCN 3.1)

- Possibly Extinct (NatureServe)

Scientific classification
- Kingdom: Fungi
- Division: Basidiomycota
- Class: Agaricomycetes
- Order: Agaricales
- Family: Hygrophoraceae
- Genus: Cora
- Species: C. timucua

Binomial name
- Cora timucua Dal-Forno, Kaminsky & Lücking (2020)

Species of lichen-forming fungus

Cora timucua, the Timucua heart lichen, is a species of lichen collected from 1885 to 1985 in Florida. The Timucua heart lichen was named to honor the Timucua people. The species is now potentially extinct but this is unknown.

== Description ==
Cora timucua lichens are around 2.5 to 7 cm across and grow on the bark of shrubs (Lyonia ferruginea and Quercus virginiana) in inland scrub and oak-dominated hardwood forests of Florida. C. timucua is a foliose lichen composed of 1–3(–5)-cm semicircular lobes, which are each 1–3(–4) cm wide and 1–3 cm long. The lobes are often striped, with some blue-green areas, as well as grey-green, to brown, or yellow regions, bleeding a reddish-brown pigment.

== Conservation ==
In a review of Red Listing methods for lichenized fungi, Cora timucua was cited as an example of a recently described species that may already be extinct, illustrating how poorly known lichens can remain undescribed until after extensive habitat loss has occurred.
