= Cora pastorum =

Scientific classification
- Kingdom: Fungi
- Division: Basidiomycota
- Class: Agaricomycetes
- Order: Agaricales
- Family: Hygrophoraceae
- Genus: Cora
- Species: C. pastorum

Binomial name
- Cora pastorum B.Moncada, Patiño & Lücking (2016)

Species of lichen

Cora pastorum is a species of basidiolichen in the family Hygrophoraceae. Found in the Andes of southern Colombia, it was formally described as a new species in 2016 by Bibiana Moncada, Ayda Lucía Patiño, and Robert Lücking. The specific epithet pastorum refers to Pasto, Colombia, where the lichen was first scientifically documented. It is only known from the type locality, where it grows as an epiphyte on páramo shrubs.
