= Cora udebeceana =

Scientific classification
- Kingdom: Fungi
- Division: Basidiomycota
- Class: Agaricomycetes
- Order: Agaricales
- Family: Hygrophoraceae
- Genus: Cora
- Species: C. udebeceana

Binomial name
- Cora udebeceana B.Moncada, R.-E.Peláez & Lücking (2016)

Species of lichen

Cora udebeceana is a species of basidiolichen in the family Hygrophoraceae. Found in Colombia, it was formally described as a new species in 2016 by Bibiana Moncada, Rouchi Nadine Peláez-Pulido, and Robert Lücking. The specific epithet udebeceana is a semi-acronym of the District University Francisco José de Caldas in Bogotá, UDBC (using the letters "u-de-be-ce"), whose herbarium holds the largest collection of lichens in Colombia. The lichen is only known to occur at the type locality in the Peña de Santa Bárbara Natural Reserve (Junín, Cundinamarca). Here it grows as an epiphyte on tree branches in mountainous rainforest.
