= Cora smaragdina =

Scientific classification
- Kingdom: Fungi
- Division: Basidiomycota
- Class: Agaricomycetes
- Order: Agaricales
- Family: Hygrophoraceae
- Genus: Cora
- Species: C. smaragdina

Binomial name
- Cora smaragdina Lücking, Rivas Plata & Chaves (2016)

Species of lichen

Cora smaragdina is a species of basidiolichen in the family Hygrophoraceae. Found in southern Costa Rica, it was formally described as a new species in 2016 by Robert Lücking, Gary Rivas-Plata, and José Luis Chaves. The specific epithet smaragdina refers to the emerald-green colour of the fresh lobes. The lichen occurs in tropical mountainous rainforest, where it grows as an epiphyte on tree bark.
