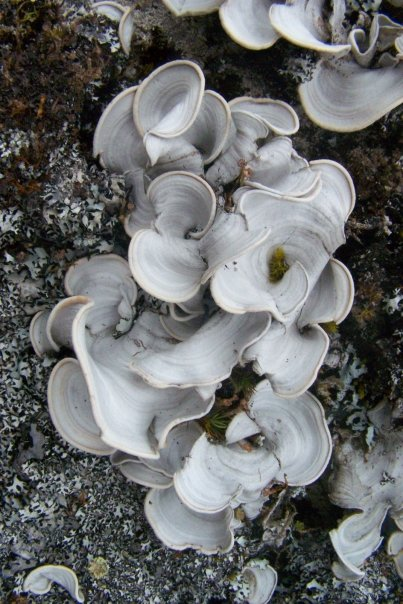
- Cora pavonia

Scientific classification
- Kingdom: Fungi
- Division: Basidiomycota
- Class: Agaricomycetes
- Order: Agaricales
- Family: Hygrophoraceae
- Genus: Cora; Fr. (1825)

Type species
- Cora pavonia (Weber & D.Mohr) Fr. (1825)

Synonyms
- Wainiocora Tomas. (1950)

= Cora (fungus) =

Genus of lichen-forming fungi

Cora is a large genus of basidiolichens in the family Hygrophoraceae. Modern molecular phylogenetics research has revealed a rich biodiversity in this largely tropical genus. The genus was originally thought to contain only a single species until DNA studies revealed its extraordinary diversity. High-throughput sequencing has also made it possible to recover fungal internal transcribed spacer (ITS) barcodes from older herbarium specimens of Cora and its close relatives (including material collected in 1888–1998), with sequences obtained from over three-quarters of the historical specimens tested. In 2016, scientists described 70 new species in one landmark study, bringing the total to nearly 200 recognized species, with estimates suggesting around 450 species may actually exist. Most species are found in the Americas, particularly in the northern Andes mountains, though some occur in tropical Africa, Asia, and Atlantic islands. These lichens typically form leaf-like structures that can create dense carpets on the ground in mountain grasslands and similar open habitats.

== Taxonomy ==
Cora was originally circumscribed by the Swedish "Father of Mycology", Elias Magnus Fries, in 1825. He included a single species, until then known as Thelephora pavonia Weber & D.Mohr. Until relatively recently, Cora was thought to contain one species, or was placed into synonymy with Dictyonema. Later authors have suggested that this broad, one-species concept was reinforced by reliance on dried herbarium material: traditional revisions often failed to capture field characters such as thallus consistency, lobe arrangement, colour, and substrate, and instead emphasised features such as hymenophore anatomy and basidiospores. Under this approach, foliose basidiolichens were long treated as a single species (Dictyonema pavonium, later D. glabratum), with other proposed taxa (including those placed in Corella) reduced to synonymy. Cora was recognized as an independent genus separate from Dictyonema in 2013.

Molecular phylogenetic analysis using DNA barcoding of the internal transcribed spacer region has improved the understanding of the diversity of Cora. In 2016, a landmark study identified and formally described 70 new species, bringing the total number of recognised Cora species to 189. This represented a dramatic increase from the single species recognized until about a decade prior. The study employed a "turbo-taxonomy" approach, combining international collaboration, rigorous quantitative phylogenetic methods, and standardised protocols for phenotype description to efficiently describe and catalog the new species. Cora species can be distinguished by a combination of morphological, anatomical, and ecogeographical features. This work established Cora as one of the most species-rich lichen genera, with estimates suggesting the existence of almost 200 species, and about 450 species predicted to exist.

In 2022, Dal Forno and coauthors broadened internal transcribed spacer (ITS) barcoding by combining newly generated sequences from 62 fresh collections (2016) with 274 historical herbarium specimens (collected 1888–1998), alongside previously available data; the resulting ITS dataset comprised 1,091 unique samples from 29 countries (1,325 sequences). Using Illumina amplicon sequencing, they recovered ITS sequences from 76.3% (209/274) of the historical specimens and 93.6% (58/62) of the fresh specimens, whereas Sanger sequencing succeeded for 19% and 58.1%, respectively.

Studies using the PhyloKey tool, which employs a technique called morphology-based phylogenetic binning, have help to elucidate the diversity within Cora. Phylogenetic binning involves mapping morphological characters onto a molecular reference tree and calculating weights for their consistency. This approach has confirmed the identification of species with high accuracy even with incomplete character data, revealing numerous previously unrecognized species. PhyloKey has also facilitated the restudy of herbarium samples, providing a more comprehensive understanding of the genus's diversity and aiding in the discovery of new species. Dal Forno and coauthors also argued that the historically small number of names in this group partly reflects missing field information: if collectors did not record colour and substrate, those features are difficult to reconstruct from pressed specimens, and small thalli were sometimes interpreted as immature. They also suggested that differences in ecology and morphology were sometimes treated as environmentally induced variation rather than taxonomic evidence, which contributed to the diversity being overlooked in earlier treatments.

== Habitat and distribution ==
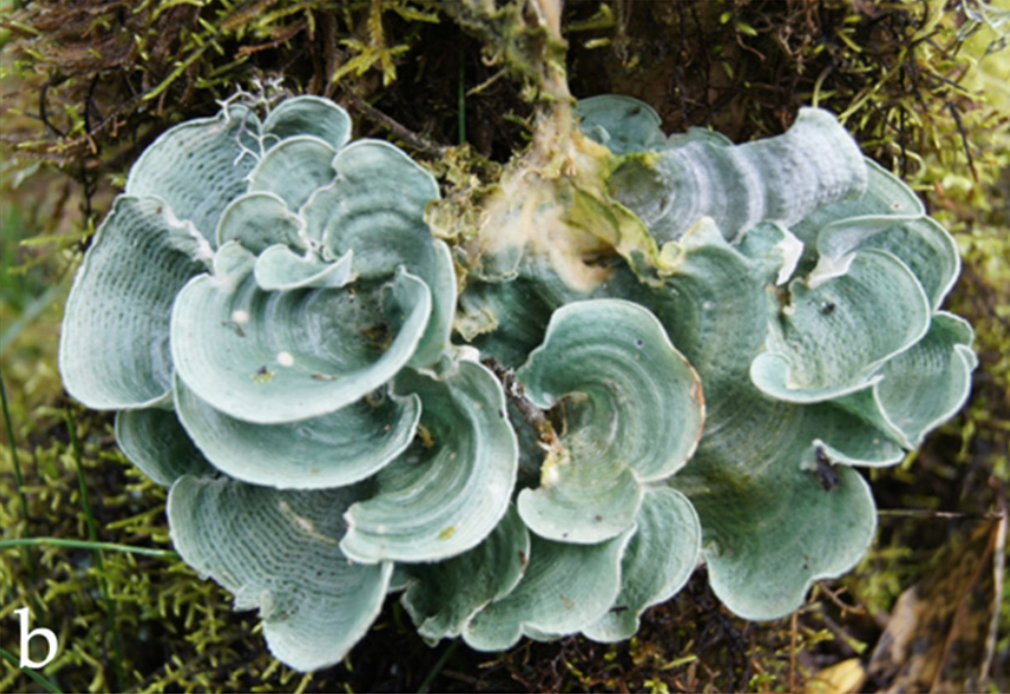
Cora cyphellifera, photographed in Ecuador

Mexico and (at least formerly) Florida are the northernmost distribution points for the genus Cora, while its southernmost locale is southern Chile. It has its highest biodiversity in the northern Andes. Biogeographic data suggests that Cora originated in South America and expanded eastward. The vast majority (95%) of the known species are found in the Americas, but the genus has also been recorded from tropical Africa, tropical Asia, and South Atlantic islands. Twelve species and subspecies have been described from Mexico; the only species known to have occurred north of Mexico is the possibly extinct Cora timucua, which is known to have formerly existed in Florida.

Sequencing of historical herbarium material has also refined distribution knowledge for the group: in a 2022 ITS dataset (1,091 samples from 29 countries), adding historical collections contributed sequence-backed records from 11 additional countries for which sequenced material of Cora and Corella had not previously been available. The same study reported range extensions for 28 Cora species and six Corella species, in each case into adjacent countries, and found that Panama's diversity was under-sampled in sequence data until 18 herbarium collections were added. The authors also detected about 25–30 additional lineages among the herbarium collections alone that they treated as requiring further study before formal description. Even with extensive barcoding, several areas were considered under-sampled for Cora and Corella, including the central and southern Andes (Peru, Bolivia, Chile, Argentina), large parts of Central America and western Mexico, and the Guyana Highlands.

== Thallus evolution, structure and ecology ==
Within the Dictyonema (in the broad sense) radiation, Cora represents the most derived stage: its foliose, shell-like lobes carry corticioid hymenophores that are fully integrated into the thallus, unlike the free or partly free basidiocarps seen in Cyphellostereum and Dictyonema. A true upper cortex—a protective layer of anticlinal and perpendicular hyphae—occurs only in Cora and its relative Corella, and anatomical differences show that the cortex of Cora evolved independently from that of Corella. The cyanobacterial partner (Rhizonema) is morphologically remodelled by the fungus: trichomes break into coiled packets enclosed by an orbicular hyphal sheath whose "jigsaw-puzzle" cells send intracellular haustoria into the photobiont—features shared with Acantholichen and Corella but absent from Cyphellostereum. Molecularly, Cora shows markedly lower ITS length variation than earlier-branching genera, consistent with a relatively recent but rapid diversification after its morphology stabilised. This refined architecture confers an ecological edge: in tropical páramo and similar open habitats, Cora lichens can form carpets of dozens to hundreds of individuals per square metre, out-competing other basidiolichens and even many ascolichens.

== Species ==
As of August 2025, Species Fungorum (in the Catalogue of Life) accepts 98 species in genus Cora.

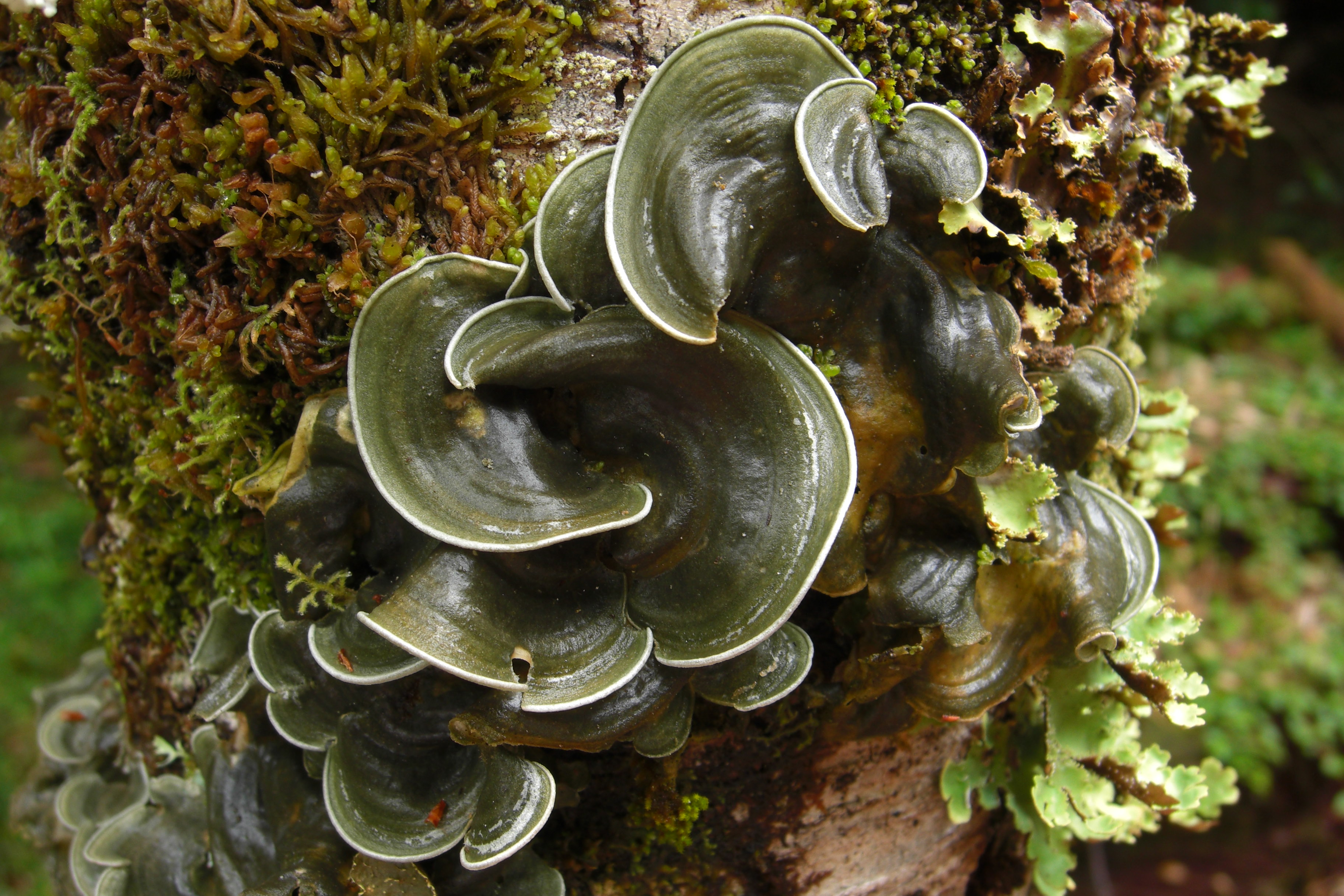
Cora glabrata, Chile

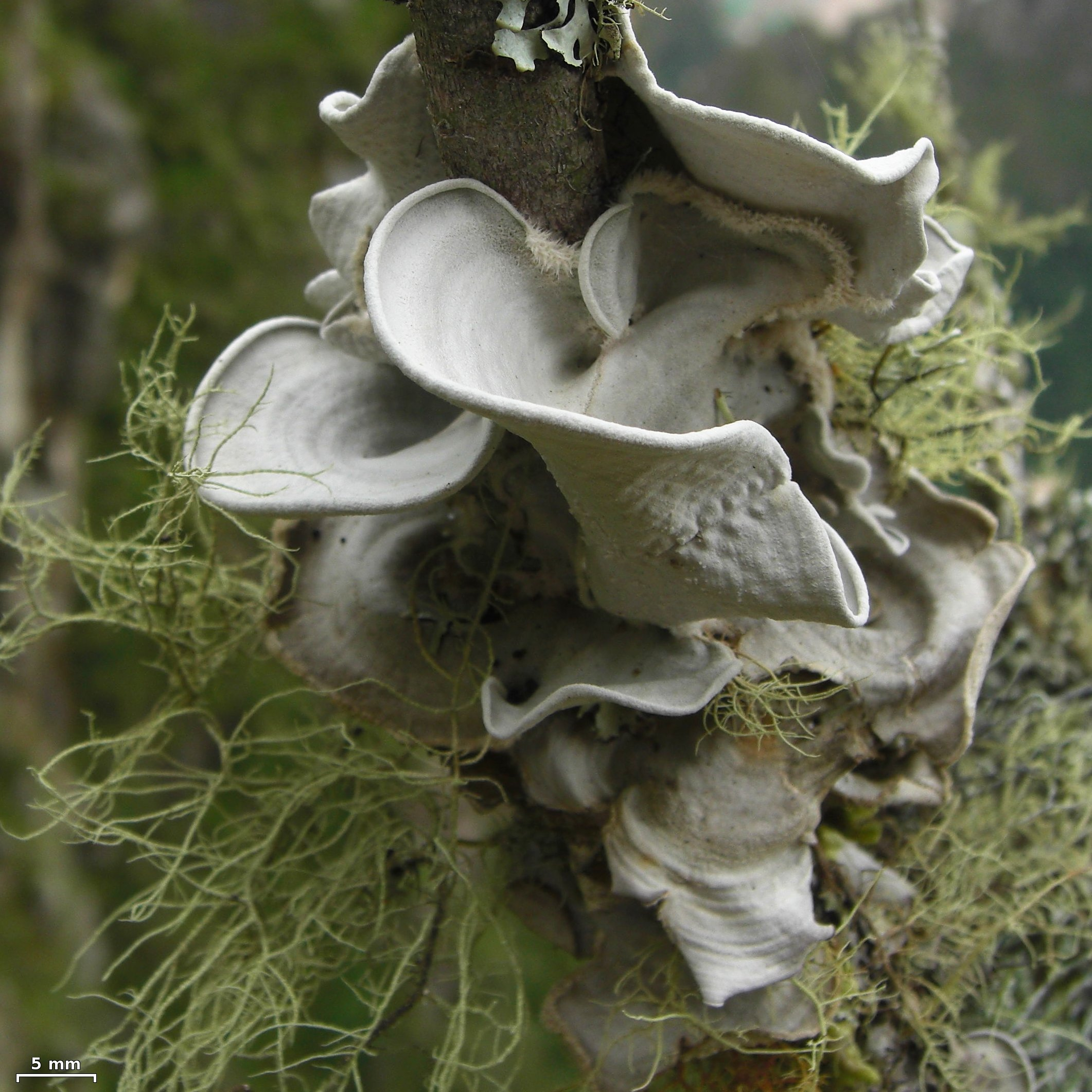
Cora species growing as an epiphyte in Machu Picchu, Peru

- Cora accipiter Moncada, Madriñán & Lücking (2016) – northern Andes, South America
- Cora applanata Moncada, Soto-Medina & Lücking (2016) – northern Andes, South America
- Cora arachnodavidea Moncada, Dal-Forno & Lücking (2016) – Colombia
- Cora arachnoidea J.E.Hern. & Lücking (2013) – northern Andes; Costa Rican Cordilleras
- Cora arborescens Dal-Forno, Chaves & Lücking (2016) – Costa Rica
- Cora arcabucana Moncada, C.Rodríguez & Lücking (2016) – Colombia
- Cora aspera Wilk, Lücking & E.Morales (2013) – Costa Rica; Colombia; Ecuador; Bolivia; Peru
- Cora aturucoa Lücking, Moncada & C.Vargas (2016) – Colombia
- Cora auriculeslia Moncada, Yánez-Ayabaca & Lücking (2016) – Ecuador
- Cora barbifera Moncada, Patiño & Lücking (2016) – Colombia
- Cora barbulata Lücking, Dal-Forno & Lawrey (2015)
- Cora benitoana Moncada, R.-E.Pérez & Lücking (2019) – Oaxaca, Mexico
- Cora boleslia Lücking, E.Morales & Dal-Forno (2016) – central Andes, Bolivia
- Cora buapana Moncada, R.-E.Pérez & Lücking (2019) – Oaxaca, Mexico
- Cora byssoidea Lücking & Moncada (2013) – Colombia
- Cora caliginosa Holgado, Rivas Plata & Perlmutter (2016) – Peru
- Cora campestris Dal-Forno, Eliasaro & A.A.Spielm. (2016) – Brazil
- Cora canari Nugra, Dal-Forno & Lücking (2016) – Ecuador
- Cora caraana Lücking, S.M.Martins & Lucheta (2016) – Brazil
- Cora casanarensis L.Y.Vargas, Moncada & Lücking (2014) – Colombia
- Cora casasolana Moncada, R.-E.Pérez & Lücking (2016) – Oaxaca, Mexico
- Cora caucensis Moncada, M.C.Gut. & Lücking (2016) – Colombia
- Cora celestinoa Moncada, Cabr.-Amaya & Lücking (2016) – Colombian Andes
- Cora ciferrii (Tomas.) Lücking, A.Grall & Thüs (2014)
- Cora comaltepeca Moncada, R.-E.Pérez & Herrera-Camp. (2016) – Oaxaca, Mexico
- Cora corani Lücking, E.Morales & Dal-Forno (2016) – Bolivia
- Cora corelleslia Moncada, Suár.-Corr. & Lücking (2016) – Colombia
- Cora crispoleslia Moncada, J.A.Molina & Lücking (2016) – northern Andes (Colombia, Ecuador)
- Cora cuzcoensis Holgado, Rivas Plata & Perlmutter (2016) – Peru
- Cora cyphellifera Dal-Forno, Bungartz & Lücking (2013) – Ecuador
- Cora dalehana Moncada, Madriñán & Lücking (2016) – Colombia
- Cora davibogotana Lücking, Moncada & Coca (2016) – Colombia
- Cora davicrinita Moncada, Madriñán & Lücking (2016) – northern Andes (Colombia, Ecuador)
- Cora davidia Moncada, L.Y.Vargas & Lücking (2016) – northern Andes (Colombia and Ecuador)
- Cora dewisanti Moncada, Suár.-Corr. & Lücking (2016) – northern Andes (Venezuela to Ecuador)
- Cora dulcis Moncada, R.-E.Pérez & Lücking (2016) – Oaxaca, Mexico
- Cora elephas Lücking, Moncada & L.Y.Vargas (2016) – Colombia; Ecuador
- Cora fimbriata L.Y.Vargas, Moncada & Lücking (2014) – Colombia
- Cora fuscodavidiana Lücking, Moncada & L.Y.Vargas (2016) – Colombia
- Cora galapagoensis Dal-Forno, Bungartz & Lücking (2017) – Galapagos Islands
- Cora garagoa Simijaca, Moncada & Lücking (2016) – Colombia
- Cora gigantea Lücking, Moncada & Coca (2016) – Colombia
- Cora glabrata (Spreng.) Fr. (1838)
- Cora gomeziana Dal-Forno, Chaves & Lücking (2016) – Costa Rica
- Cora guajalitensis Lücking, Robayo & Dal-Forno (2016) – Ecuador
- Cora guzmaniana Moncada, R.-E.Pérez & Lücking (2019) – Oaxaca, Mexico
- Cora gyrolophia Fr. (1838)
- Cora hafecesweorthensis Moncada, Lücking & R.-E.Peláez (2016) – Colombia
- Cora haledana Dal-Forno, Chaves & Lücking (2016) – Costa Rica
- Cora hawksworthiana Dal-Forno, P.R.Nelson & Lücking (2016) – Chile; Colombia; Costa Rica
- Cora hirsuta (Moncada & Lücking) Moncada & Lücking (2013)
- Cora hochesuordensis Lücking, E.Morales & Dal-Forno (2016) – Bolivia
- Cora hymenocarpa Lücking, Chaves & Lawrey (2016) – Costa Rica
- Cora imi Lücking, Chaves & Lawrey (2016) – Costa Rica
- Cora inversa Lücking & Moncada (2013) – Colombia
- Cora itabaiana Dal-Forno, Aptroot & M.Cáceres (2016) – Brazil
- Cora ixtlanensis Moncada, R.-E.Pérez & Lücking (2019) – Oaxaca, Mexico
- Cora lawreyana Moncada, R.-E.Pérez & Lücking (2019) – Veracruz, Mexico
- Cora leslactuca Lücking, Moncada & R.-E.Peláez (2016) – Colombia
- Cora marusae Moncada, R.-E.Pérez & Lücking (2019) – Oaxaca, Mexico
- Cora maxima Wilk, Dal-Forno & Lücking (2016) – Bolivia
- Cora minor (Lücking, E.Navarro & Sipman) Lücking (2013)
- Cora minutula Lücking, Moncada & Yánez-Ayabaca (2016) – Ecuador
- Cora neoparabovei Oset, Flakus & Guzow-Krzem. (2025) – Bolivia
- Cora neopseudobovei Oset, Flakus & Guzow-Krzem. (2025) – Bolivia
- Cora palaeotropica Weerakoon, Aptroot & Lücking (2016) – Sri Lanka
- Cora palustris Dal-Forno, Chaves & Lücking (2016) – Costa Rica
- Cora parabovei Dal-Forno, Kukwa & Lücking (2016) – Bolivia
- Cora paraciferrii Lücking, Moncada & J.E.Hern. (2016) – northern Andes (Colombia and Venezuela)
- Cora paraminor Dal-Forno, Chaves & Lücking (2016) – Costa Rica
- Cora pastorum Moncada, Patiño & Lücking (2016) – Colombia
- Cora pavonia (Weber & D.Mohr) Fr. (1838)
- Cora pichinchensis Paredes, Jonitz & Dal-Forno (2016) – Ecuadorian Andes
- Cora pikynasa J.-M.Torres, Moncada & Lücking (2016) – Colombia
- Cora pseudobovei Wilk, Dal-Forno & Lücking (2016) – Bolivia
- Cora pseudocorani Lücking, E.Morales & Dal-Forno (2016) – Bolivia
- Cora putumayensis L.J.Arias, Moncada & Lücking (2016) – Colombia
- Cora quillacinga Moncada, F.Ortega & Lücking (2016) – Colombia
- Cora rothesiorum Moncada, Madriñán & Lücking (2016) – Colombia
- Cora rubrosanguinea Nugra, Moncada & Lücking (2016) – Ecuador
- Cora sanctae-helenae Lücking (2015) – Saint Helena
- Cora santacruzensis Dal-Forno, Bungartz & Yánez-Ayabaca (2016) – Galapagos, Ecuador
- Cora schizophylloides Moncada, C.Rodríguez & Lücking (2016) – Colombia
- Cora setosa L.Y.Vargas, Moncada & Lücking (2014) – Colombia
- Cora smaragdina Lücking, Rivas Plata & Chaves (2016) – Costa Rica
- Cora soredavidia Dal-Forno, Marcelli & Lücking (2016) – Costa Rica
- Cora squamiformis Wilk, Lücking & Yánez-Ayabaca (2013) – Ecuadorian and Bolivian high Andes
- Cora strigosa Lücking, E.Paz & L.Salcedo (2013) – Peru
- Cora subdavicrinita Moncada, J.A. Molina & Lücking (2016) – northern Andes (Colombia, Ecuador)
- Cora suturifera Nugra, Besal & Lücking (2016) – Ecuador
- Cora terrestris Dal-Forno, Chaves & Lücking (2016) – Costa Rica
- Cora terricoleslia Wilk, Dal-Forno & Lücking (2016) – Bolivia
- Cora timucua Lücking, Kaminsky, Perlmutter, Lawrey & Dal-Forno (2020) – Florida, United States (possibly extinct)
- Cora totonacorum Moncada, R.-E.Pérez & Lücking (2019) – Veracruz, Mexico
- Cora trindadensis Lücking, M.Cáceres, N.G.Silva & R.J.V.Alves (2015) – Ilha da Trindade (Brazil)
- Cora udebeceana Moncada, R.-E.Peláez & Lücking (2016) – Colombia
- Cora undulata L.Y.Vargas, Moncada & Lücking (2014) – Colombia
- Cora urceolata Moncada, Coca & Lücking (2016) – Colombia
- Cora verjonensis Lücking, Moncada & Dal-Forno (2016) – Colombia
- Cora viliewoa Lücking, Chaves & Soto-Medina (2016) – Costa Rica; Colombia; Ecuador
- Cora yukiboa Merc.-Díaz, Moncada & Lücking (2016) – Puerto Rico
- Cora zapotecorum Moncada, R.-E.Pérez & Lücking (2019) – Oaxaca, Mexico
