= Cora caucensis =

Scientific classification
- Kingdom: Fungi
- Division: Basidiomycota
- Class: Agaricomycetes
- Order: Agaricales
- Family: Hygrophoraceae
- Genus: Cora
- Species: C. caucensis

Binomial name
- Cora caucensis B.Moncada, M.C.Gut. & Lücking (2016)

Species of lichen

Cora caucensis is a species of basidiolichen in the family Hygrophoraceae. It was formally described as a new species in 2016 by Bibiana Moncada, Martha Cecilia Gutiérrez, and Robert Lücking. The specific epithet caucensis refers to Cauca, the province of the type locality. The lichen is known to occur only at this location, where it grows on the ground in paramo vegetation between grasses and bryophytes.
