= Cora haledana =

Scientific classification
- Kingdom: Fungi
- Division: Basidiomycota
- Class: Agaricomycetes
- Order: Agaricales
- Family: Hygrophoraceae
- Genus: Cora
- Species: C. haledana

Binomial name
- Cora haledana Dal-Forno, Chaves & Lücking (2016)

Species of lichen

Cora haledana is a species of basidiolichen in the family Hygrophoraceae. Found in Costa Rica, it was formally described as a new species in 2016 by Manuela Dal Forno, José Luis Chaves, and Robert Lücking. The specific epithet haledana is a reverse anagram of the name of mycologist David Leslie Hawksworth. The lichen is only known to occur at the type locality in the Cerro de la Muerte, where it grows in the páramo as an epiphyte on tree branches and twigs.
