= Cora paraminor =

Scientific classification
- Kingdom: Fungi
- Division: Basidiomycota
- Class: Agaricomycetes
- Order: Agaricales
- Family: Hygrophoraceae
- Genus: Cora
- Species: C. paraminor

Binomial name
- Cora paraminor Dal-Forno, Chaves & Lücking (2016)

Species of lichen

Cora paraminor is a species of basidiolichen in the family Hygrophoraceae. Found in Costa Rica, it was formally described as a new species in 2016 by Manuela Dal Forno, José Luis Chaves, and Robert Lücking. The specific epithet paraminor refers to its close relationship with Cora minor. Cora paraminor is known to occur only at the type locality at the Los Santos Forest Reserve in Cerro de la Muerte. Here it grows in mountainous forest as an epiphyte, on the twigs and branches of trees. Its phylogenetically distinct namesake, C. minor, is also found in Costa Rica, but in Chirripó National Park. The authors suggest this may represent an example of allopatric speciation resulting from geographic isolation of these two species caused by the two isolated, highest-altitude Costa Rican mountain peaks.
