= Cora dewisanti =

Scientific classification
- Kingdom: Fungi
- Division: Basidiomycota
- Class: Agaricomycetes
- Order: Agaricales
- Family: Hygrophoraceae
- Genus: Cora
- Species: C. dewisanti

Binomial name
- Cora dewisanti B.Moncada, Suár.-Corr. & Lücking (2016)

Species of lichen

Cora dewisanti is a species of basidiolichen in the family Hygrophoraceae. It was formally described as a new species in 2016 by Bibiana Moncada, Alejandra Suárez-Corredor, and Robert Lücking. The specific epithet dewisanti refers to the Welsh version of the name David (Dewi Sant), and honours mycologist David Leslie Hawksworth. The lichen occurs at elevations above 3,000 m (9,800 ft) in the northern Andes from Venezuela to Ecuador, where it grows on the ground between bryophytes and other lichens.
