= Cora palustris =

Scientific classification
- Kingdom: Fungi
- Division: Basidiomycota
- Class: Agaricomycetes
- Order: Agaricales
- Family: Hygrophoraceae
- Genus: Cora
- Species: C. palustris

Binomial name
- Cora palustris B.Moncada, C.Rodríguez & Lücking (2016)

Species of lichen

Cora palustris is a species of basidiolichen in the family Hygrophoraceae. Found in Costa Rica, it was formally described as a new species in 2016 by Manuela Dal Forno, José Luis Chaves, and Robert Lücking. The specific epithet palustris is derived from the Latin palus ("bog" or "swamp"), and refers to its habitat at the type locality. The lichen occurs in the Cerro de la Muerte area of Costa Rica, where it grows on the soil with grasses and bryophytes.
