= Cora guajalitensis =

Scientific classification
- Kingdom: Fungi
- Division: Basidiomycota
- Class: Agaricomycetes
- Order: Agaricales
- Family: Hygrophoraceae
- Genus: Cora
- Species: C. guajalitensis

Binomial name
- Cora guajalitensis Lücking, Robayo & Dal-Forno (2016)

Species of lichen

Cora guajalitensis is a species of basidiolichen in the family Hygrophoraceae. Found in Ecuador, it was formally described as a new species in 2016 by Robert Lücking, Javier Robayo, and Manuela Dal Forno. The specific epithet guajalitensis refers to the type locality in the Río Guajalito Protected Forest in Pichincha Province. The lichen is only known to occur at this location, where it grows on the ground in association with other lichens and mosses.
