= Cora dulcis =

Scientific classification
- Kingdom: Fungi
- Division: Basidiomycota
- Class: Agaricomycetes
- Order: Agaricales
- Family: Hygrophoraceae
- Genus: Cora
- Species: C. dulcis

Binomial name
- Cora dulcis B.Moncada, R.-E.Pérez & Lücking (2016)

Species of lichen

Cora dulcis is a species of basidiolichen in the family Hygrophoraceae. Found in southern Mexico, it was formally described as a new species in 2016 by Bibiana Moncada, Rosa Emilia Pérez, and Robert Lücking. The specific epithet dulcis honours Mexican ecologist Dulce María Figueroa Castro, who helped organize the trip where the lichen was found. It is only known to occur at the type locality in Cerro De Las Antenas (Santiago Comaltepec, Oaxaca), where it grows on the ground and over bryophytes in tropical-temperate cloud forest.
