= Cora rubrosanguinea =

Scientific classification
- Kingdom: Fungi
- Division: Basidiomycota
- Class: Agaricomycetes
- Order: Agaricales
- Family: Hygrophoraceae
- Genus: Cora
- Species: C. rubrosanguinea

Binomial name
- Cora rubrosanguinea Nugra, B.Moncada & Lücking (2016)

Species of lichen

Cora rubrosanguinea is a species of basidiolichen in the family Hygrophoraceae. Found in Ecuador, it was formally described as a new species in 2016 by Freddy Nugra, Bibiana Moncada, and Robert Lücking The specific epithet rubrosanguinea refers to the reddish pigment that exudes from rewetted herbarium material. The lichen is found in the northern Andes of Ecuador, where it grows on the ground or over rocks with bryophytes.
