= Cora parabovei =

Scientific classification
- Kingdom: Fungi
- Division: Basidiomycota
- Class: Agaricomycetes
- Order: Agaricales
- Family: Hygrophoraceae
- Genus: Cora
- Species: C. parabovei

Binomial name
- Cora parabovei Dal-Forno, Kukwa & Lücking (2016)

Species of lichen

Cora parabovei is a species of basidiolichen in the family Hygrophoraceae. Found in Bolivia, it was formally described as a new species in 2016 by Manuela Dal-Forno, Martin Kukwa, and Robert Lücking. The specific epithet parabovei refers to its close phylogenetic association with Cora bovei. The lichen is only known from the type specimen, collected in the Cotapata National Park and Integrated Management Natural Area (Nor Yungas Province). In this area, a transition zone between páramo and mountainous cloud forest, the lichen was found growing on the ground. Its namesake, C. bovei, is a smaller species found in Chile.
