= Cora terricoleslia =

Scientific classification
- Kingdom: Fungi
- Division: Basidiomycota
- Class: Agaricomycetes
- Order: Agaricales
- Family: Hygrophoraceae
- Genus: Cora
- Species: C. terricoleslia

Binomial name
- Cora terricoleslia Wilk, Dal-Forno & Lücking (2016)

Species of lichen

Cora terricoleslia is a species of basidiolichen in the family Hygrophoraceae. Found in Bolivia, it was formally described as a new species in 2016 by Karina Wilk, Manuela Dal Forno, and Robert Lücking. The specific epithet terricoleslia combines a reference to the lichen's terricolous growth and also honours mycologist David Leslie Hawksworth. The lichen is only known to occur in the type locality–Chacaltaya in the Bolivian high Andes, at an altitude of 4,980 m (16,340 ft). This is the highest altitude recorded for a species of Cora. At this location, the lichen grows on the ground with mosses and other vegetation of the puna grassland.
