= Cora pseudobovei =

Scientific classification
- Kingdom: Fungi
- Division: Basidiomycota
- Class: Agaricomycetes
- Order: Agaricales
- Family: Hygrophoraceae
- Genus: Cora
- Species: C. pseudobovei

Binomial name
- Cora pseudobovei Wilk, Dal-Forno & Lücking (2016)

Species of lichen

Cora pseudobovei is a species of basidiolichen in the family Hygrophoraceae. Found in Bolivia, it was formally described as a new species in 2016 by Karina Wilk, Manuela Dal Forno, and Robert Lücking The specific epithet pseudobovei refers to its resemblance to Cora bovei. The lichen is only known from the type locality, located at an altitude of 4,677 m (15,344 ft) in Madidi National Park (Franz Tamayo Province, La Paz). Here, in this puna grassland ecoregion, it grows on the ground amongst mosses.
