= Cora strigosa =

Scientific classification
- Kingdom: Fungi
- Division: Basidiomycota
- Class: Agaricomycetes
- Order: Agaricales
- Family: Hygrophoraceae
- Genus: Cora
- Species: C. strigosa

Binomial name
- Cora strigosa Lücking, E.Paz & L.Salcedo (2013)

Species of lichen

Cora strigosa is a species of basidiolichen in the family Hygrophoraceae. Found in Peru, it was formally described as a new species in 2013 by Robert Lücking, Elias Paz, and Luis Salcedo. The type specimen was collected in Piscacucho at an altitude of about 2,700 m (8,900 ft). Here, in montane rainforest and pasture near Machu Picchu, the lichen grows on rocks together with other lichens, such as Hypotrachyna and Rimelia. Cora strigosa is only known to occur at the type locality. The specific epithet strigosa refers to the strigose (i.e., with dense, short, hair-like projections) upper surface of the thallus, especially prominent where they project radially at the margins. This lichen resembles Cora hirsuta, but it is not closely related.
