= Cora ciferrii =

Scientific classification
- Kingdom: Fungi
- Division: Basidiomycota
- Class: Agaricomycetes
- Order: Agaricales
- Family: Hygrophoraceae
- Genus: Cora
- Species: C. ciferrii

Binomial name
- Cora ciferrii (Tomas.) Lücking, A.Grall & Thüs (2014)

Synonyms
- Wainiocora ciferrii Tomas. (1950)

Species of lichen

Cora ciferrii is a species of basidiolichen in the family Hygrophoraceae. The species was originally described in 1950 from Panama but was later found to have been confused with other similar-looking lichens for decades. In 2014, DNA studies helped scientists sort out this confusion and confirmed it as a distinct species with its current name. The lichen grows on the ground in misty mountain forests of Central and South America, forming large, wavy, shell-like structures that can reach over 10 cm (3.9 in) across.

== Taxonomy ==
Cora ciferrii was originally described in 1950 as Wainiocora ciferrii by the Italian lichenologist Ruggero Tomaselli, from specimens collected in Panama. In 2014 Robert Lücking, Aurélie Grall and Holger Thüs transferred the species to Cora, publishing the new combination Cora ciferrii.

For decades the name Cora pavonia (and its synonym Dictyonema glabratum) had been used broadly for several superficially similar lichens across the Neotropics. Molecular and morphological work showed that material so labelled in fact belonged to multiple species in two genera (Cora and Corella). When the lectotype of C. pavonia was fixed to a Jamaican epiphytic specimen, the widespread ground-dwelling taxon with large, unbranched lobes was left without a valid name. The same study therefore reinstated Tomaselli's epithet, recognising the terrestrial species as Cora ciferrii and separating it from C. pavonia.

Under this circumscription C. ciferrii represents a distinct lineage within Cora; the species is characterised by its terrestrial habit, broad undulate lobes and strongly rugose (wrinkled) upper surface. Earlier records of "Cora pavonia" from Central and South America that match this morphology are now regarded as C. ciferrii.

== Description ==
Cora ciferrii develops broad, shell-like lobes that join into sizeable rosettes. The lobes are usually unbranched and their upper surface is conspicuously wavy, a feature that is even more accentuated than in close relatives. When fresh the upper surface is olive- to grey-brown, turning pale grey once dried. The undulations give the thallus a corrugated, almost ruffled appearance. Under a hand lens faint concentric ridges formed by growth rings are visible. The underside lacks a true lower cortex and instead shows a felty mat of hyphae (the fungus threads); on this surface the hymenophore (the spore-producing layer) appears as irregular, cream to pale-yellow patches that often merge into larger blotches. C. ciferrii forms large thalli and lobes relative to other members of the genus; individual lobes frequently reach several centimetres across, giving whole thalli a diameter of 10 cm or more.

Like all basidiolichens of Cora, the thallus is layered: a thin upper cortex of tightly woven fungal hyphae overlies a greenish photobiont layer of cyanobacterial cells, with a loose medulla beneath. The hymenophore carries basidia, the club-shaped cells that create spores, hidden in the patches on the lower surface.

== Habitat and distribution ==
Cora ciferrii is a ground-dweller. It grows on soil or plant debris between cushions of bryophytes (mosses and their allies), rather than directly on bare rock or tree bark. This terricolous habit helps to separate it from several look-alike Cora species that prefer twigs or trunks. The species was first described from Panama, but DNA studies now place most records in the Chocó biogeographic region, chiefly southern Colombia and Ecuador. Older herbarium material that matched this morphology and was once filed under "Cora pavonia" from Central and South America should instead be treated as C. ciferrii.

Collections come from cool, humid environments of upper montane cloud forest and sub-páramo, typically above 2,000 m (6,600 ft) elevation where frequent mists keep the ground mossy and shaded. The lichen often shares its niche with bryophytes and other ground-layer foliose lichens, taking advantage of the stable moisture that these plants retain.
