= Cora gigantea =

Scientific classification
- Kingdom: Fungi
- Division: Basidiomycota
- Class: Agaricomycetes
- Order: Agaricales
- Family: Hygrophoraceae
- Genus: Cora
- Species: C. gigantea

Binomial name
- Cora gigantea Lücking, B.Moncada & Coca (2016)

Species of lichen

Cora gigantea is a species of basidiolichen in the family Hygrophoraceae. It was formally described as a new species in 2016 by Robert Lücking Bibiana Moncada, and Luis Fernando Coca. The specific epithet gigantea refers the large size of the thallus, and indirectly references David Leslie Hawksworth, who the authors describe as "a giant in mycology and lichenology". The lichen occurs in the mountainous cloud forests of Colombia at elevations around 2,500 m (8,200 ft), where it grows on the ground and between bryophyte and lichen mats.
