= Cora inversa =

Scientific classification
- Kingdom: Fungi
- Division: Basidiomycota
- Class: Agaricomycetes
- Order: Agaricales
- Family: Hygrophoraceae
- Genus: Cora
- Species: C. inversa

Binomial name
- Cora inversa Lücking & B.Moncada (2013)

Species of lichen

Cora inversa is a species of basidiolichen in the family Hygrophoraceae. Found in Colombia, it was formally described as a new species in 2013 by lichenologists Robert Lücking and Bibiana Moncada. The type specimen was collected in the Páramo El Verjón (in Choachí, Cundinamarca Department) at an altitude of 3,200 m (10,500 ft). Here the lichen grows as an epiphyte, typically at the base of páramo shrubs, and often between bryophytes. The specific epithet refers to the partially strigose (i.e., with dense, short, hair-like projections) underside, presenting in an inverse fashion compared to Cora hirsuta, which is strigose on the upper side.
