= Cora urceolata =

Scientific classification
- Kingdom: Fungi
- Division: Basidiomycota
- Class: Agaricomycetes
- Order: Agaricales
- Family: Hygrophoraceae
- Genus: Cora
- Species: C. urceolata

Binomial name
- Cora urceolata B.Moncada, Coca & Lücking (2016)

Species of lichen

Cora urceolata is a species of basidiolichen in the family Hygrophoraceae. Found in Colombia, it was formally described as a new species in 2016 by Bibiana Moncada, Luis Fernando Coca, and Robert Lücking. The specific epithet urceolata refers to the strongly concave ("urceolate") lobes of the lichen. It occurs in páramo regions of central Colombia, where it grows on the ground with bryophytes and other lichens.
