= Cora corelleslia =

Scientific classification
- Kingdom: Fungi
- Division: Basidiomycota
- Class: Agaricomycetes
- Order: Agaricales
- Family: Hygrophoraceae
- Genus: Cora
- Species: C. corelleslia

Binomial name
- Cora corelleslia B.Moncada, Suár.-Corr. & Lücking (2016)

Species of lichen

Cora corelleslia is a species of basidiolichen in the family Hygrophoraceae. It was formally described as a new species in 2016 by Bibiana Moncada, Alejandra Suárez-Corredor, and Robert Lücking. The specific epithet arborescens refers both to its superficial resemblance to Corella, and the middle name of mycologist David Leslie Hawksworth. The lichen is only known to occur in the Cundinamarca of Colombia, where it grows as an epiphyte over liverworts on paramo shrubs.
