= Cora palaeotropica =

Scientific classification
- Kingdom: Fungi
- Division: Basidiomycota
- Class: Agaricomycetes
- Order: Agaricales
- Family: Hygrophoraceae
- Genus: Cora
- Species: C. palaeotropica

Binomial name
- Cora palaeotropica Weerakoon, Aptroot & Lücking (2016)

Species of lichen

Cora palaeotropica is a species of basidiolichen in the family Hygrophoraceae. Found in Sri Lanka, it was formally described as a new species in 2016 by Gothamie Weerakoon, André Aptroot, and Robert Lücking. The specific epithet palaeotropica refers to its palaeotropical distribution, which is unique in the genus Cora. It is only known from its type locality in the Sinharaja Forest Reserve, a biodiversity hotspot in the Southern Province.

== Description ==
Unusually for genus Cora, Cora palaeotropica does not make a distinct cortex, instead it has short, perpendicular hyphae with rounded edges that emerge from the photobiont layer. It grows on the soil and its detritus, or in association with bryophytes.
