= Cora crispoleslia =

Scientific classification
- Kingdom: Fungi
- Division: Basidiomycota
- Class: Agaricomycetes
- Order: Agaricales
- Family: Hygrophoraceae
- Genus: Cora
- Species: C. crispoleslia

Binomial name
- Cora crispoleslia B.Moncada, J.A.Molina & Lücking (2016)

Species of lichen

Cora crispoleslia is a species of basidiolichen in the family Hygrophoraceae. It was formally described as a new species in 2016 by Bibiana Moncada, Jorge Alberto Molina, and Robert Lücking. The specific epithet crispoleslia combines the Latin word crispulus ("curly") with the middle name of mycologist David Leslie Hawksworth. The lichen occurs in the northern Andes of Colombia and Ecuador at elevations greater than 3,000 m (9,800 ft), where it grows as an epiphyte on paramo shrubs.
