= Cora gomeziana =

Scientific classification
- Kingdom: Fungi
- Division: Basidiomycota
- Class: Agaricomycetes
- Order: Agaricales
- Family: Hygrophoraceae
- Genus: Cora
- Species: C. gomeziana

Binomial name
- Cora gomeziana Dal-Forno, Chaves & Lücking (2016)

Species of lichen

Cora gomeziana is a species of basidiolichen in the family Hygrophoraceae. Found in Costa Rica, it was formally described as a new species in 2016 by Manuela Dal Forno, José Luis Chaves, and Robert Lücking. The specific epithet gomeziana refers to Costa Rican biologist Luis Diego Gómez Pignataro (1944–2009), who studied Costa Rican basidiolichens starting in the 1970s. The lichen is only known to occur in the type locality in the Cerro de la Muerte, where it grows on the ground among bryophytes and ground-dwelling angiosperms.
