= Cora comaltepeca =

Scientific classification
- Kingdom: Fungi
- Division: Basidiomycota
- Class: Agaricomycetes
- Order: Agaricales
- Family: Hygrophoraceae
- Genus: Cora
- Species: C. comaltepeca

Binomial name
- Cora comaltepeca B.Moncada, R.-E.Pérez & Lücking (2016)

Species of lichen

Cora comaltepeca is a species of basidiolichen in the family Hygrophoraceae. Found in southern Mexico, it was formally described as a new species in 2016 by Bibiana Moncada, Rosa Emilia Pérez, and Robert Lücking. The specific epithet comaltepeca refers to the type locality in Santiago Comaltepec (Oaxaca), where it grows as an epiphyte on tree branches in tropical-temperate cloud forests.
