= Cora corani =

Scientific classification
- Kingdom: Fungi
- Division: Basidiomycota
- Class: Agaricomycetes
- Order: Agaricales
- Family: Hygrophoraceae
- Genus: Cora
- Species: C. corani

Binomial name
- Cora corani Lücking, E.Morales & Dal-Forno (2016)

Species of lichen

Cora corani is a species of basidiolichen in the family Hygrophoraceae. Found in Bolivia, it was formally described as a new species in 2016 by Robert Lücking, Eduardo Morales, and Manuela Dal Forno. The specific epithet corani refers to the type locality in the Corani Lake reservoir, the only place the lichen is known to occur. Here it grows on the ground over bryophytes and with other lichens.
