= Cora davibogotana =

Scientific classification
- Kingdom: Fungi
- Division: Basidiomycota
- Class: Agaricomycetes
- Order: Agaricales
- Family: Hygrophoraceae
- Genus: Cora
- Species: C. davibogotana

Binomial name
- Cora davibogotana Lücking, B.Moncada & Coca (2016)

Species of lichen

Cora davibogotana is a species of basidiolichen in the family Hygrophoraceae. Found in Colombia, it was formally described as a new species in 2016 by Robert Lücking, Bibiana Moncada, and Luis Fernando Coca. The specific epithet davibogotana combines the first name of mycologist David Leslie Hawksworth and Bogotá, where the type locality is. Here the lichen grows on shaded rocks or on the ground in wet cloud forests.
