= Cora soredavidia =

Scientific classification
- Kingdom: Fungi
- Division: Basidiomycota
- Class: Agaricomycetes
- Order: Agaricales
- Family: Hygrophoraceae
- Genus: Cora
- Species: C. soredavidia

Binomial name
- Cora soredavidia Dal-Forno, Marcelli & Lücking (2016)

Species of lichen

Cora soredavidia is a species of basidiolichen in the family Hygrophoraceae. Found in both Central and South America, it was formally described as a new species in 2016 by Manuela Dal Forno, Marcelo Pinto Marcelli, and Robert Lücking. The specific epithet soredavidia combines a reference to the sorediate margins and the first name of mycologist David Leslie Hawksworth. The lichen is found in Costa Rica's Cerro de la Muerte (the type locality), as well as the southeastern Atlantic forest in Brazil. It grows as an epiphyte on tree twigs and branches.
