= Cora dalehana =

Scientific classification
- Kingdom: Fungi
- Division: Basidiomycota
- Class: Agaricomycetes
- Order: Agaricales
- Family: Hygrophoraceae
- Genus: Cora
- Species: C. dalehana

Binomial name
- Cora dalehana B.Moncada, Madriñán & Lücking (2016)

Species of lichen

Cora dalehana is a species of basidiolichen in the family Hygrophoraceae. Found in Colombia, it was formally described as a new species in 2016 by Bibiana Moncada, Santiago Madriñán, and Robert Lücking. The specific epithet dalehana is a syllable acronym of the name of mycologist David Leslie Hawksworth. The lichen is only known to occur in the northern Andes close to Bogotá, where it grows on the ground between bryophytes and plants.
