= Cora trindadensis =

Scientific classification
- Kingdom: Fungi
- Division: Basidiomycota
- Class: Agaricomycetes
- Order: Agaricales
- Family: Hygrophoraceae
- Genus: Cora
- Species: C. trindadensis

Binomial name
- Cora trindadensis Lücking, M.Cáceres, N.G.Silva & R.J.V.Alves (2015)

Species of lichen

Cora trindadensis is a species of basidiolichen in the family Hygrophoraceae. Found in the Brazil, it was formally described as a new species in 2015 by Robert Lücking, Marcela Cáceres, Nílber Silva, and Ruy Alves. The type specimen was collected at the summit of Desejado Peak (Ilha da Trindade), in a cloud forest predominated by the tree fern Cyathea copelandii as well as plants in genus Myrsine. The lichen grows as an epiphyte on the lower trunks of trees. The specific epithet refers to its type locality, the only place it is known to occur.
