= Cora rothesiorum =

Scientific classification
- Kingdom: Fungi
- Division: Basidiomycota
- Class: Agaricomycetes
- Order: Agaricales
- Family: Hygrophoraceae
- Genus: Cora
- Species: C. rothesiorum

Binomial name
- Cora rothesiorum B.Moncada, Madriñán & Lücking (2016)

Species of lichen

Cora rothesiorum is a species of basidiolichen in the family Hygrophoraceae. Found in Colombia, it was formally described as a new species in 2016 by Bibiana Moncada, Santiago Madriñán, and Robert Lücking. The specific epithet rothesiorum refers to the Earl of Rothes, which was the origin of the name Leslie, and an indirect tribute to mycologist David Leslie Hawksworth. The lichen occurs in the northern Andes of Colombia, close to Bogotá, where it grows as an epiphyte of páramo shrubs in shaded places. Cora rothesiorum is in a clade with Cora minor.
