= Cora yukiboa =

Scientific classification
- Kingdom: Fungi
- Division: Basidiomycota
- Class: Agaricomycetes
- Order: Agaricales
- Family: Hygrophoraceae
- Genus: Cora
- Species: C. yukiboa

Binomial name
- Cora yukiboa Merc.-Díaz, B.Moncada & Lücking (2016)

Species of lichen

Cora yukiboa is a species of basidiolichen in the family Hygrophoraceae. Found in Puerto Rico, it was formally described as a new species in 2016 by Joel Mercado-Díaz, Bibiana Moncada, and Robert Lücking The specific epithet yukiboa refers to Yukibo, the Taíno chief of the Daguao village where the type locality is. The lichen is found in summit forests of El Toro peak in the El Yunque National Forest, at an elevation of 1,074 m (3,524 ft). Here it grows as an epiphyte on shrubs.
