= Cora hawksworthiana =

Scientific classification
- Kingdom: Fungi
- Division: Basidiomycota
- Class: Agaricomycetes
- Order: Agaricales
- Family: Hygrophoraceae
- Genus: Cora
- Species: C. hawksworthiana

Binomial name
- Cora hawksworthiana Dal-Forno, P.R.Nelson & Lücking (2016)

Species of lichen

Cora hawksworthiana is a species of basidiolichen in the family Hygrophoraceae. It was formally described as a new species in 2016 by Manuela Dal Forno, Peter Nelson, and Robert Lücking. The specific epithet hawksworthiana honours mycologist David Leslie Hawksworth "on the occasion of his seventieth birthday, for his innumerable contributions to mycology". The lichen occurs at altitudes above 3,000 m (9,800 ft) in the wet páramo of the northern Andes in Colombia, in Costa Rica, and in subalpine to temperate rainforest of Chile. It grows as an epiphyte on the partly shaded twigs of shrubs and small trees. Cora hawksworthiana is one of the few species in genus Cora that does not have a regionally or locally limited distribution.
