= Cora sanctae-helenae =

Scientific classification
- Kingdom: Fungi
- Division: Basidiomycota
- Class: Agaricomycetes
- Order: Agaricales
- Family: Hygrophoraceae
- Genus: Cora
- Species: C. sanctae-helenae

Binomial name
- Cora sanctae-helenae Lücking (2015)

Species of lichen

Cora sanctae-helenae is a species of lichen in the family Hygrophoraceae. Found in the British Overseas Territory of Saint Helena (South Atlantic), it was formally described as a new species in 2015 by lichenologist Robert Lücking. It is only known from a few collections, some of them dating back to the late 1700s. Cora sanctae-helenae appears to be restricted to the tree fern thicket or cloud forest in the native upper vegetation zone of the island. The type specimen was collected in 1954 from Diana's Peak. According to the records, the lichen grows as an epiphyte on thin twigs and plant stems. It was not found in a 2006 survey.
