= Cora verjonensis =

Scientific classification
- Kingdom: Fungi
- Division: Basidiomycota
- Class: Agaricomycetes
- Order: Agaricales
- Family: Hygrophoraceae
- Genus: Cora
- Species: C. verjonensis

Binomial name
- Cora verjonensis Lücking, B.Moncada & Dal-Forno (2016)

Species of lichen

Cora verjonensis is a species of basidiolichen in the family Hygrophoraceae. Found in the northern Andes of Colombia, it was formally described as a new species in 2016 by Robert Lücking, Bibiana Moncada, and Manuela Dal Forno. The specific epithet verjonensis refers to the type locality–Matarredonda Ecological Park in el Verjón. It is only known to occur at this location, where it grows as an epiphyte on páramo shrubs. The Ecuadorian species Cora canari is similar in size, colour, and ecology, but it is not closely related.
