= Cora lawreyana =

Scientific classification
- Kingdom: Fungi
- Division: Basidiomycota
- Class: Agaricomycetes
- Order: Agaricales
- Family: Hygrophoraceae
- Genus: Cora
- Species: C. lawreyana

Binomial name
- Cora lawreyana Moncada, R.-E.Pérez & Lücking (2019)

Species of lichen

Cora lawreyana is a species of basidiolichen in the family Hygrophoraceae. Found in Mexico, it was formally described as a new species in 2019 by Bibiana Moncada, Rosa Emilia Pérez-Pérez, and Robert Lücking. The type specimen was collected in the La Cortadura Ecological Reserve (Coatepec, Veracruz) in a cloud forest at an altitude of 2,088 m (6,850 ft). It is only known to occur at the type locality, where it grows as an epiphyte on the trunks of trees, usually on or around mosses and liverworts, such as from the genera Frullania, Metzgeria, and Plagiochila. The specific epithet honours lichenologist James D. Lawrey, who, according to the authors, "has made numerous contributions to lichenology in such diverse fields as ecology, lichenicolous fungi, and the evolution of basidiolichens and their photobionts".
