= Cora leslactuca =

Scientific classification
- Kingdom: Fungi
- Division: Basidiomycota
- Class: Agaricomycetes
- Order: Agaricales
- Family: Hygrophoraceae
- Genus: Cora
- Species: C. leslactuca

Binomial name
- Cora leslactuca Lücking, B.Moncada & R.-E.Peláez (2016)

Species of lichen

Cora leslactuca is a species of basidiolichen in the family Hygrophoraceae. It was formally described as a new species in 2016 by Robert Lücking, Bibiana Moncada, and Rouchi Nadine Peláez-Pulido. The specific epithet leslactuca combines the second syllable of David Leslie Hawksworth's middle name with the genus name Lactuca, thereby both alluding to the resemblance of the thallus to lettuce leaves and honouring the British mycologist. The lichen is known only from its type locality in the Bosques Peña de Santa Bárbara Natural Reserve (Junín, Cundinamarca). In this location, a wet cloud forest zone at elevations between 2,500 and 3,000 m (8,200 and 9,800 ft), the lichen grows on rocks in the páramo.
