= Cora celestinoa =

Scientific classification
- Kingdom: Fungi
- Division: Basidiomycota
- Class: Agaricomycetes
- Order: Agaricales
- Family: Hygrophoraceae
- Genus: Cora
- Species: C. celestinoa

Binomial name
- Cora celestinoa B.Moncada, Cabr.-Amaya & Lücking (2016)

Species of lichen

Cora celestinoa is a species of basidiolichen in the family Hygrophoraceae. It was formally described as a new species in 2016 by Bibiana Moncada, Diego Mauricio Cabrera-Amaya, and Robert Lücking. The specific epithet celestinoa honours Spanish botanist José Celestino Mutis, an important figure in Colombian botany. The lichen occurs in the central Colombian Andes, where it grows on the ground between bryophytes in páramo regions.
