= Cora fuscodavidiana =

Scientific classification
- Kingdom: Fungi
- Division: Basidiomycota
- Class: Agaricomycetes
- Order: Agaricales
- Family: Hygrophoraceae
- Genus: Cora
- Species: C. fuscodavidiana

Binomial name
- Cora fuscodavidiana Lücking, B.Moncada & L.Y.Vargas (2016)

Species of lichen

Cora fuscodavidiana is a species of basidiolichen in the family Hygrophoraceae. Found in Colombia, it was formally described as a new species in 2016 by Robert Lücking, Bibiana Moncada, and Leidy Yasmín Vargas-Mendoza. The specific epithet fuscodavidiana combines the Latin word fuscus ("brown") with the first name of mycologist David Leslie Hawksworth. The lichen is only known to occur at the type locality in the Sumapaz Páramo, where it grows on rocks and in shaded bryophyte and lichen mats.
