= Cora davicrinita =

Scientific classification
- Kingdom: Fungi
- Division: Basidiomycota
- Class: Agaricomycetes
- Order: Agaricales
- Family: Hygrophoraceae
- Genus: Cora
- Species: C. davicrinita

Binomial name
- Cora davicrinita B.Moncada, Madriñán & Lücking (2016)

Species of lichen

Cora davicrinita is a species of basidiolichen in the family Hygrophoraceae. It was formally described as a new species in 2016 by Bibiana Moncada, Santiago Madriñán, and Robert Lücking. The specific epithet davicrinita combines the first name of mycologist David Leslie Hawksworth with the Latin word crinitis ("fluffy"). The lichen occurs at elevations above 3,000 m (9,800 ft) in the northern Andes of Colombia and Ecuador, where it grows in wet páramo as an epiphyte on shrub twigs. It is closely related to a complex of species around Cora minor.
