= Cora minutula =

Scientific classification
- Kingdom: Fungi
- Division: Basidiomycota
- Class: Agaricomycetes
- Order: Agaricales
- Family: Hygrophoraceae
- Genus: Cora
- Species: C. minutula

Binomial name
- Cora minutula Lücking, B.Moncada & Yánez-Ayabaca (2016)

Species of lichen

Cora minutula is a species of basidiolichen in the family Hygrophoraceae. Found in Ecuador, it was formally described as a new species in 2016 by Robert Lücking, Bibiana Moncada, and Alba Yánez-Ayabaca. The specific epithet minutula refers to the small size of the thallus—measuring up to 2 cm (0.8 in) across. The lichen is known only from the type locality, in the páramo of La Virgen (Papallacta, Napo. Here, in the northern Andes at elevations above 3,000 m (9,800 ft), it grows as an epiphyte on páramo shrubs.
