= Cora galapagoensis =

Scientific classification
- Kingdom: Fungi
- Division: Basidiomycota
- Class: Agaricomycetes
- Order: Agaricales
- Family: Hygrophoraceae
- Genus: Cora
- Species: C. galapagoensis

Binomial name
- Cora galapagoensis Dal-Forno, Bungartz & Lücking (2017)

Species of lichen

Cora galapagoensis is a species of basidiolichen in the family Hygrophoraceae. It is Endemic to the Galápagos Islands, where it grows as an epiphyte on branches and trunks, usually in close association with other lichens and bryophytes. It was formally described as a new species in 2017 by Manuela Dal-Forno, Frank Bungartz, and Robert Lücking. It is a fairly common species in its range, and has been recorded from Isabela, Santa Cruz and Santiago islands. Preferred habitats include Miconia shrublands, secondary forests of Cinchona pubescens and Psidium guajava (both introduced species), and forests of Persea americana (avocado) and Scalesia pedunculata. The lichen can form colonies over 1 m (3.3 ft) broad with closely adjoining (imbricate) lobes
