= Cora squamiformis =

Scientific classification
- Kingdom: Fungi
- Division: Basidiomycota
- Class: Agaricomycetes
- Order: Agaricales
- Family: Hygrophoraceae
- Genus: Cora
- Species: C. squamiformis

Binomial name
- Cora squamiformis Wilk, Lücking & Yánez-Ayabaca (2013)

Species of lichen

Cora squamiformis is a species of basidiolichen in the family Hygrophoraceae. Found in the high Andes of South America, it was formally described as a new species in 2013 by Karina Wilk, Robert Lücking, and Alba Yánez-Ayabaca. The type specimen was collected in Madidi National Park at an altitude of 4,677 m (15,344 ft). The lichen occurs in Bolivia and Ecuador, where it grows on the ground between bryophytes amongst high-mountain vegetation. It forms olive-grey to grey thalli up to 3 cm (1.2 in) across, each typically comprising 3 to 5 semicircular lobes. The specific epithet squamiformis refers to the squamulose (scaley) appearance of the thallus. A close relative, Cora pavonia, occurs in the same habitat in Ecuador; it has much larger thalli and a different lobe configuration than C. squamiformis.
