= Cora garagoa =

Scientific classification
- Kingdom: Fungi
- Division: Basidiomycota
- Class: Agaricomycetes
- Order: Agaricales
- Family: Hygrophoraceae
- Genus: Cora
- Species: C. garagoa

Binomial name
- Cora garagoa Simijaca, B.Moncada & Lücking (2016)

Species of lichen

Cora garagoa is a species of basidiolichen in the family Hygrophoraceae. Found in Colombia, it was formally described as a new species in 2016 by Diego Fernando Simijaca, Bibiana Moncada, and Robert Lücking. The specific epithet garagoa refers to the type locality in Garagoa, the only place where the lichen is known to occur. It grows as an epiphyte in mountainous rainforests.
