= Cora imi =

Scientific classification
- Kingdom: Fungi
- Division: Basidiomycota
- Class: Agaricomycetes
- Order: Agaricales
- Family: Hygrophoraceae
- Genus: Cora
- Species: C. imi

Binomial name
- Cora imi Lücking, Chaves & Lawrey (2016)

Species of lichen

Cora imi is a species of basidiolichen in the family Hygrophoraceae. Found in Costa Rica, it was formally described as a new species in 2016 by Robert Lücking, José Luis Chaves, and James D. Lawrey. The specific epithet imi is an acronym for the International Mycological Institute. The lichen is known only from the type collection, which was found at an altitude of about 3,400 m (11,200 ft) in the Los Santos Forest Reserve in Cerro de la Muerte. Here it was growing on the ground in páramo among bryophytes.
