= Cora caliginosa =

Scientific classification
- Kingdom: Fungi
- Division: Basidiomycota
- Class: Agaricomycetes
- Order: Agaricales
- Family: Hygrophoraceae
- Genus: Cora
- Species: C. caliginosa

Binomial name
- Cora caliginosa Holgado, Rivas Plata & Perlmutter (2016)

Species of lichen

Cora caliginosa is a rare species of basidiolichen in the family Hygrophoraceae. Found in Peru, it was formally described as a new species in 2016 by María Holgado-Rojas, Eimy Rivas-Plata, and Gary Perlmutter. It is only known to occur near the type locality near Machu Picchu, where it grows on the ground close to a disturbed rainforest. The lichen forms rosettes up to 10 cm across with dark olive-grey lobes that have pale, rolled-in edges and produce cream-coloured reproductive patches on their undersides.

== Taxonomy ==
Cora caliginosa is a basidiolichen in the family Hygrophoraceae (order Agaricales). It was described in 2016 by Johana Holgado, Jesús Rivas Plata, and Steven Perlmutter from material collected near Piscacucho, close to Machu Picchu in the Peruvian Andes. The epithet, from the Latin caliginosus ("dull, somber, cloudy"), refers to the lichen's dark olive-grey thallus when fresh. ITS sequence data place the species in the same subclade as the Mexican C. casasolana and the Ecuadorian C. pichinchensis, but each taxon occupies a separate branch, reinforcing the distinctiveness of C. caliginosa.

== Description ==
The thallus of Cora caliginosa is terricolous and foliose, forming rosettes up to 10 cm across over cushions of bryophytes. It comprises five to ten semicircular or irregular lobes, 1–3 cm wide and 1–5 cm long, which branch moderately and are separated by short radial sutures. Fresh lobes are uniformly dark olive-grey, bordered by thin, rolled-in (involute) margins that are pale olive and often become eroded; herbarium material fades to white-grey with cream-coloured edges. The upper surface is even to very shallowly wavy (undulate) when moist and becomes wrinkled (rugose) on drying; it is otherwise smooth (glabrous) except for indistinct bands of short whitish hairs. The lower surface lacks a cortex (it is ecorticate) and reveals an olive-grey, felty-arachnoid medulla.

Vertical sections are 400–450 micrometres (μm) thick. A viaduct-shaped upper cortex, 30–50 μm deep, overlies a 50–70 μm zone of anticlinal hyphae. The photobiont layer is 150–220 μm thick, orange-brown above and aeruginous-green below; the medulla is 70–100 μm thick and lacks clamp connections or papilliform hyphae. The fertile surface (hymenophore) forms irregular to linear, resupinate patches on the underside that soon coalesce and may cover large areas of the thallus. Individual patches start at 0.5–1.5 mm long and 1–5 mm broad but may merge into zones up to 5 mm wide and 15 mm long, creamy to pale yellow and edged by slightly rough, minutely pilose margins. Sections 80–120 μm thick show a palisade of basidioles (20–30 × 5–7 μm) and scattered four-spored basidia (25–35 × 5–7 μm); basidiospores have not been observed. No secondary metabolites were detected by thin-layer chromatography.

== Habitat and distribution ==
Known only from the type locality at about 3,500 m elevation near Piscacucho, Cuzco Region, Peru, Cora caliginosa grows on soil over bryophytes in the margins of a disturbed sub-Andean montane rainforest. The dark, hydrophobic thallus and rapidly confluent hymenophore may help the lichen withstand the alternating wet and drying cycles typical of this cloud-forest ecotone.
