= Caraá =

Municipality of Rio Grande do Sul, Brazil

- Municipality
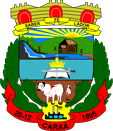
- Flag Coat of arms

- Location within Rio Grande do Sul

- Location in Brazil
- Coordinates: 29°48′S 50°18′W
- Country: Brazil
- State: Rio Grande do Sul

Population (2020)
  - Total: 8,350
- Time zone: UTC−3 (BRT)

Caraá is a municipality in the state of Rio Grande do Sul, Brazil where Rio dos Sinos' river rises. It was originally part of the city Santo Antônio da Patrulha, emancipated on December 28, 1995.

== History ==
First inhabitants of Caraá were the indigenous that gave name to the place. Caraá is a type of bamboo that was very abundant in there.

== See also ==
- List of municipalities in Rio Grande do Sul
