= Rioblanco =

Coordinates: 3°30′N 75°50′W

- Municipality and town
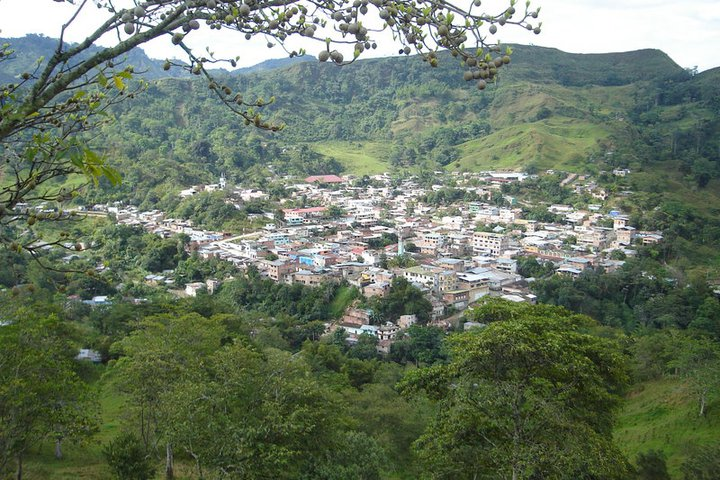
- View of Rioblanco

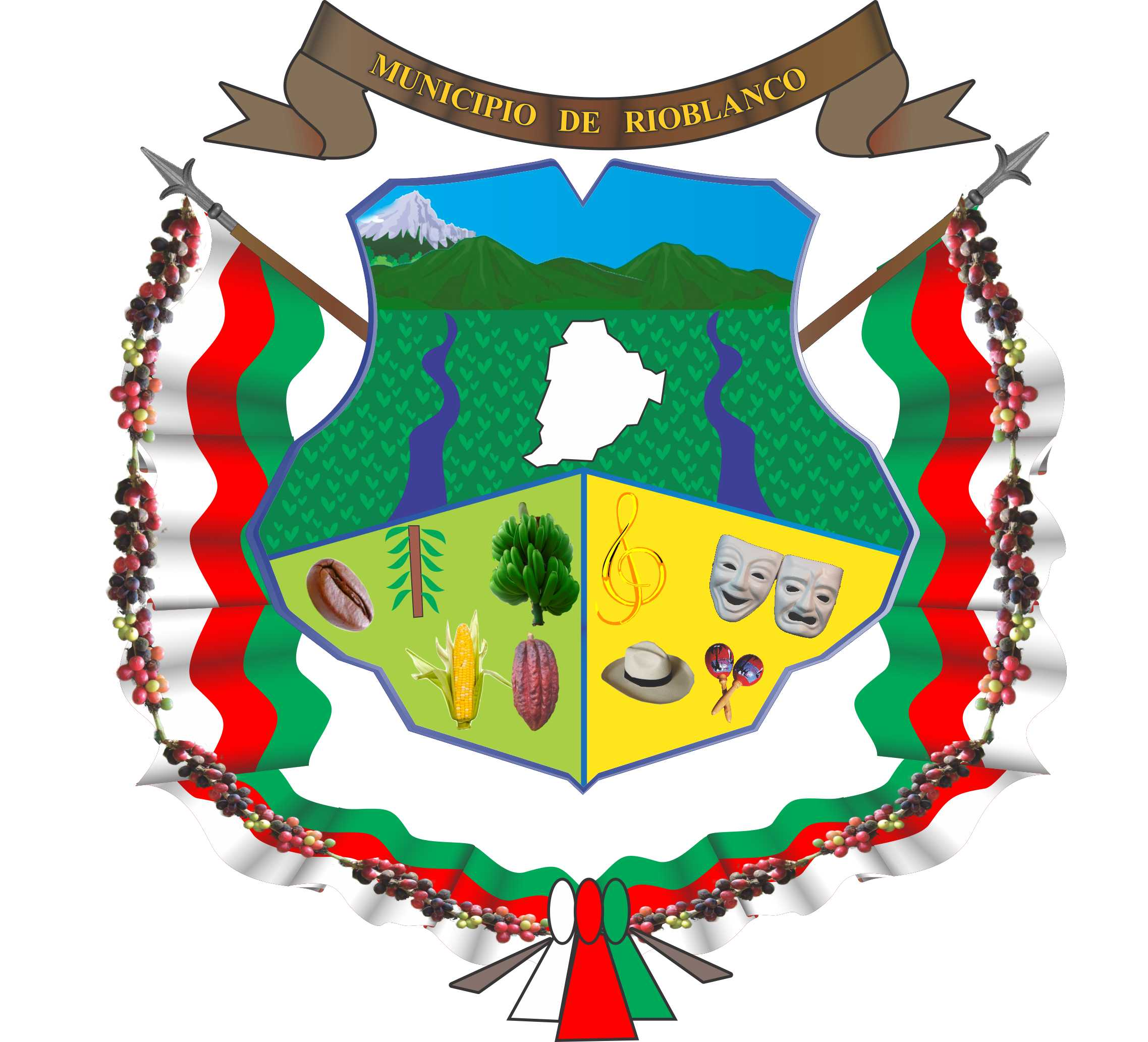
- Flag Coat of arms

- Location of the municipality and town of Rioblanco in the Tolima Department of Colombia.
- Country: Colombia
- Department: Tolima Department

Government
  - mayor: Delcy Esperanza Isaza

Area
  - Total: 1,443 km^{2} (557 sq mi)
- Elevation: 900 m (3,000 ft)

Population (Census 2018)
  - Total: 19,090
- Time zone: UTC-5 (Colombia Standard Time)

Rioblanco is a town and municipality in the Tolima department of Colombia. The population of the municipality was 19,090 as of the 2018 census.

== Climate ==
Inírida has a tropical rainforest climate (Köppen Af) with heavy rainfall except for the period from June to September.

Climate data for Rioblanco (Relator), elevation 1,200 m (3,900 ft), (1981–2010)
Month	Jan	Feb	Mar	Apr	May	Jun	Jul	Aug	Sep	Oct	Nov	Dec	Year
Mean daily maximum °C (°F)	27.2 (81.0)	27.7 (81.9)	27.5 (81.5)	27.7 (81.9)	27.9 (82.2)	28.3 (82.9)	28.6 (83.5)	29.4 (84.9)	29.4 (84.9)	28.0 (82.4)	26.8 (80.2)	26.8 (80.2)	27.9 (82.2)
Daily mean °C (°F)	22.5 (72.5)	22.7 (72.9)	22.7 (72.9)	22.9 (73.2)	23.0 (73.4)	23.1 (73.6)	23.1 (73.6)	23.5 (74.3)	23.6 (74.5)	22.9 (73.2)	22.4 (72.3)	22.3 (72.1)	22.9 (73.2)
Mean daily minimum °C (°F)	18.1 (64.6)	18.2 (64.8)	18.3 (64.9)	18.3 (64.9)	18.5 (65.3)	18.4 (65.1)	18.1 (64.6)	18.3 (64.9)	18.3 (64.9)	18.2 (64.8)	18.2 (64.8)	18.2 (64.8)	18.2 (64.8)
Average precipitation mm (inches)	214.7 (8.45)	194.8 (7.67)	238.8 (9.40)	285.2 (11.23)	226.7 (8.93)	111.7 (4.40)	88.1 (3.47)	80.3 (3.16)	137.2 (5.40)	293.3 (11.55)	257.4 (10.13)	237.8 (9.36)	2,353.3 (92.65)
Average precipitation days	18	17	19	20	19	15	14	13	15	21	23	20	212
Average relative humidity (%)	78	77	78	78	78	77	74	70	71	76	80	80	76
Source: Instituto de Hidrologia Meteorologia y Estudios Ambientales
