= Cora maxima =

Scientific classification
- Kingdom: Fungi
- Division: Basidiomycota
- Class: Agaricomycetes
- Order: Agaricales
- Family: Hygrophoraceae
- Genus: Cora
- Species: C. maxima

Binomial name
- Cora maxima Wilk, Dal-Forno & Lücking (2016)

Species of lichen

Cora maxima is a species of basidiolichen in the family Hygrophoraceae. Found in Bolivia, it was formally described as a new species in 2016 by Karina Wilk, Manuela Dal Forno, and Robert Lücking. The specific epithet maxima refers to its relatively large size—its thallus grows up to 20 cm (8 in) across. The lichen is only known to occur in Bolivia, where it grows as an epiphyte in tropical mountainous rainforests.
