= Cora viliewoa =

Scientific classification
- Kingdom: Fungi
- Division: Basidiomycota
- Class: Agaricomycetes
- Order: Agaricales
- Family: Hygrophoraceae
- Genus: Cora
- Species: C. viliewoa

Binomial name
- Cora viliewoa Lücking, Chaves & Soto-Medina (2016)

Species of lichen

Cora viliewoa is a species of basidiolichen in the family Hygrophoraceae. Found in Central and South America, it was formally described as a new species in 2016 by Robert Lücking José Luis Chaves, and Edier Soto-Medina. The specific epithet viliewoa is a syllabic anagram combining the second syllables of the names of mycologist David Leslie Hawksworth, to whom the publication was dedicated. The lichen occurs in Costa Rica, Colombia, and Ecuador, where it grows as an epiphyte on tree branches.
