= Cora pichinchensis =

Scientific classification
- Kingdom: Fungi
- Division: Basidiomycota
- Class: Agaricomycetes
- Order: Agaricales
- Family: Hygrophoraceae
- Genus: Cora
- Species: C. pichinchensis

Binomial name
- Cora pichinchensis Paredes, Jonitz & Dal-Forno (2016)

Species of lichen

Cora pichinchensis is a species of basidiolichen in the family Hygrophoraceae. Found in Ecuador, it was formally described as a new species in 2016 by Telma Paredes, Harald Jonitz, and Manuela Dal Forno. The specific epithet pichinchensis refers to Pichincha Province, the province containing the Pululahua Geobotanical Reserve–where the type locality is. The lichen occurs in the Andes of Ecuador, growing close to the ground and associating with bryophytes in shaded or partly shaded areas.
