= Cora benitoana =

Scientific classification
- Kingdom: Fungi
- Division: Basidiomycota
- Class: Agaricomycetes
- Order: Agaricales
- Family: Hygrophoraceae
- Genus: Cora
- Species: C. benitoana

Binomial name
- Cora benitoana Moncada, R.-E.Pérez & Lücking (2019)

Species of lichen

Cora benitoana is a species of basidiolichen in the family Hygrophoraceae. Found in Mexico, it was formally described as a new species in 2019 by Bibiana Moncada, Rosa Emilia Pérez-Pérez, and Robert Lücking. The type specimen was collected in a cloud forest on Cerro Pelón (Santiago Comaltepec, Oaxaca) at an altitude of 2,990 m (9,810 ft). The specific epithet honours Benito Pablo Juárez García, Mexican President from the state of Oaxaca.

Cora benitoana is only known to occur in a small region in Oaxaca, where it grows as an epiphyte on tree trunks in a cloud forest, at elevations ranging from 2,000 to 3,000 m (6,600 to 9,800 ft). It usually grows over mosses and liverworts, particularly from the genus Frullania.

== Description ==
Cora buapana is a medium-sized foliose lichen that grows on tree and shrub branches, forming rosettes up to about 15 cm across. It typically has 5–25 semi-circular lobes that may overlap slightly. Each lobe is comparatively small (roughly 1.5–3 cm wide and 1–2 cm long) and often branches from the base, with thin radial cracks that sometimes reveal the green photobiont within. These little cracks can give the impression of a granular or sorediate texture, but they are simply exposed algal clusters, not true soredia. When fresh, the lobes are a dark grey to olive-grey colour with no concentric banding, and they have distinct light grey, inward-curving margins. In dry conditions or in herbarium material, the thallus becomes a whitish to pale grey tone throughout. The upper surface of C. buapana is uneven but completely smooth (no hairs) both when moist and when dry. The margins remain smooth as well, lacking any ciliary hairs or fuzz. The underside of the lobes is not covered by a cortex; instead, the white fibrous medulla is exposed, giving a felty or cobwebby texture (arachnoid). This underside is whitish when the lichen is fresh, turning to a yellowish-white with age or drying.

The hymenophore (spore-bearing surface) in Cora buapana is corticioid, meaning it forms a smooth, crust-like spore-bearing layer rather than discrete cups. On the underside of the lobes, this hymenophore appears as thin, elongated patches or strips that run in concentric circles, following the curve of the lobe. These spore patches are relatively narrow (only about 0.5–1 mm wide, but up to 3–15 mm long) and they can branch or fuse together (anastomose), creating a roughly ring-like pattern beneath the lobe. When fresh, the hymenophore is bright white, turning creamy or pale flesh-coloured when dried. It has a smooth surface and mostly smooth edges, though under a hand lens one might see that the margins are nearly bald to very finely fuzzy (minutely pilose). One characteristic microscopic feature of C. buapana is the presence of papilliform hyphal appendages on the lower medullary hyphae. These are tiny fungal outgrowths: in this species they are elongated, almost finger-like or flask-shaped, and some are even forked (partly branched). They measure only about 3–7 micrometres in length, so they are visible only under magnification. These hyphal "hairs" are scattered across the underside filaments and sometimes described as coralloid (coral-like) due to their branching form. Aside from these, the internal structure shows no algae on the underside (the photobiont is in a layer just below the top cortex) and no clamp connections in the fungal hyphae. Chemically, no unique substances are detected in this species.

The defining characteristics of Cora buapana are its grey-olive coloration, smooth concentric hymenophore, and especially the presence of those long, finger-like hyphal appendages on the underside. Many other Cora species of similar size are various shades of green when fresh, but C. buapana is greyish, which helps differentiate it.
