= Cora arachnoidea =

Scientific classification
- Kingdom: Fungi
- Division: Basidiomycota
- Class: Agaricomycetes
- Order: Agaricales
- Family: Hygrophoraceae
- Genus: Cora
- Species: C. arachnoidea

Binomial name
- Cora arachnoidea J.E.Hern. & Lücking (2013)

Species of lichen

Cora arachnoidea is a species of basidiolichen in the family Hygrophoraceae. Found in Venezuela, it was formally described as a new species in 2013 by Jesús Hernández and Robert Lücking. The type specimen was collected in the surroundings of Laguna de Mucubají (in the Parque Nacional Sierra Nevada, Venezuela), at an altitude of 3,626 m (11,896 ft). The specific epithet makes reference to the arachnoid (cobwebby) texture of the thallus surface. Another member of the genus with a similar surface is Cora hirsuta.

Cora arachnoidea is widely distributed in the northern Andes (including Colombia, Venezuela, and Bolivia) and the Cordilleras of Costa Rica. It grows on the soil amongst páramo vegetation, often in association with bryophytes.
