= Cora hafecesweorthensis =

Scientific classification
- Kingdom: Fungi
- Division: Basidiomycota
- Class: Agaricomycetes
- Order: Agaricales
- Family: Hygrophoraceae
- Genus: Cora
- Species: C. hafecesweorthensis

Binomial name
- Cora hafecesweorthensis B.Moncada, Lücking & R.-E.Peláez (2016)

Species of lichen

Cora hafecesweorthensis is a species of basidiolichen in the family Hygrophoraceae. Found in Colombia, it was formally described as a new species in 2016 by Bibiana Moncada, Robert Lücking, and Rouchi Nadine Peláez-Pulido. The specific epithet hafecesweorthensis refers to Hafecesweorthe, an early Anglo-Saxon name for Hawksworth in Yorkshire, and an indirect tribute to mycologist David Leslie Hawksworth. The lichen is only known from its type locality in the Bosques Peña de Santa Bárbara Natural Reserve in Cundinamarca. Here it occurs in wet subpáramo and subandine cloud forest at altitudes between 2,500 and 3,000 m (8,200 and 9,800 ft). The lichen grows on the ground, between other lichens and bryophytes.
