= Cora buapana =

Scientific classification
- Kingdom: Fungi
- Division: Basidiomycota
- Class: Agaricomycetes
- Order: Agaricales
- Family: Hygrophoraceae
- Genus: Cora
- Species: C. buapana

Binomial name
- Cora buapana Moncada, R.-E.Pérez & Lücking (2019)

Species of lichen

Cora buapana is a species of basidiolichen in the family Hygrophoraceae. Found in Mexico, it was formally described as a new species in 2019 by Bibiana Moncada, Rosa Emilia Pérez-Pérez, and Robert Lücking. The type specimen was collected from a cloud forest on the Cerro Las Antenas (Santiago Comaltepec, Oaxaca) at an altitude of 2,190 m (7,190 ft). The specific epithet pays tribute to the Benemérita Universidad Autónoma de Puebla (BUAP), which is the oldest and largest university in the state of Puebla.

Cora buapana is only known to occur in a small region of Oaxaca, where it grows as an epiphyte on tree and shrub branches, typically over and around mosses and liverworts. It is found in cloud forests at an altitude range between 2,000 and 3,000 m (6,600 and 9,800 ft). Cora benitoana is a sympatic species.
