= Cora aspera =

Scientific classification
- Kingdom: Fungi
- Division: Basidiomycota
- Class: Agaricomycetes
- Order: Agaricales
- Family: Hygrophoraceae
- Genus: Cora
- Species: C. aspera

Binomial name
- Cora aspera Wilk, Lücking & E.Morales (2013)

Species of lichen

Cora aspera is a species of basidiolichen in the family Hygrophoraceae. Found in Central and South America, it was formally described as a new species in 2013 by Karina Wilk, Robert Lücking, and Eduardo Morales. The type specimen was collected in the Siberia region near La Palma (Caballero, Santa Cruz, Bolivia) at an altitude of 2,582 m (8,471 ft). Here, in a Yungas cloud forest, it grows as an epiphyte on bark. The specific epithet alludes to the roughened texture of the thallus surface, especially under dry conditions. The lichen has been recorded from Costa Rica, Colombia, Ecuador, Bolivia, and Peru, and it grows on twigs and branches in montane rainforest and páramo vegetation.
