= Corani Lake =

Lake in Cochabamba Department, Bolivia

Laguna Corani
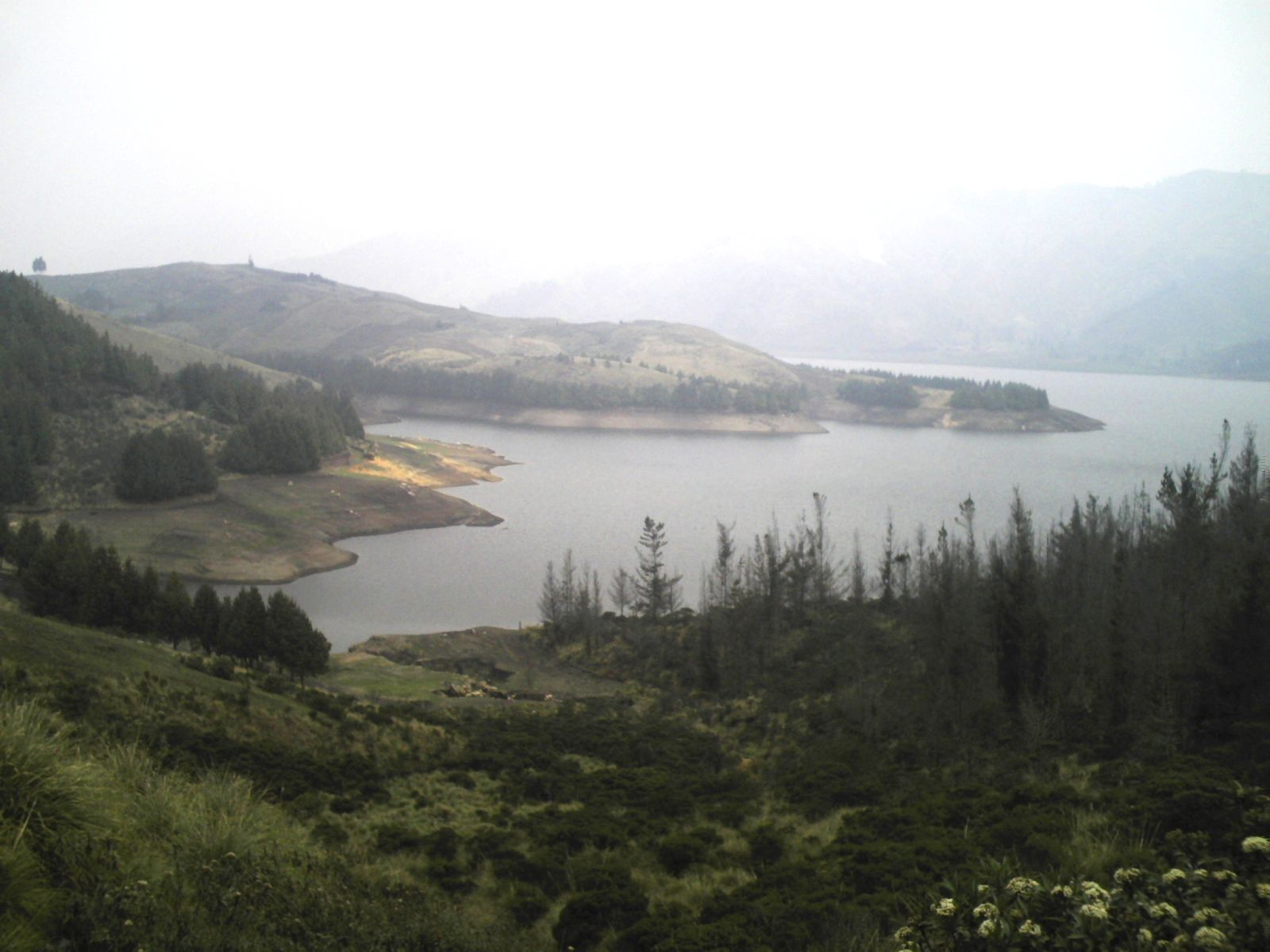

- Location within Cochabamba Location within Bolivia Location within South America
- Interactive map of Laguna Corani
- Location: Chapare Province, Cochabamba Department
- Coordinates: 17°16′S 65°54′W
- Basin countries: Bolivia
- Surface area: 18 km^{2} (6.9 sq mi)

Laguna Corani is a lake in the Chapare Province, Cochabamba Department, Bolivia. Its surface area is 18 km^{2}.
