= Centro Sur Subregion =

Central Southern District Distrito Centro Sur
- District
- Country: Colombia
- Department: Caldas
- Time zone: UTC−5 (COT)

The Central Southern District is a district of Caldas Department, Colombia.

- Manizales (Capital)
- Chinchina
- Neira
- Palestina
- Villamaria
