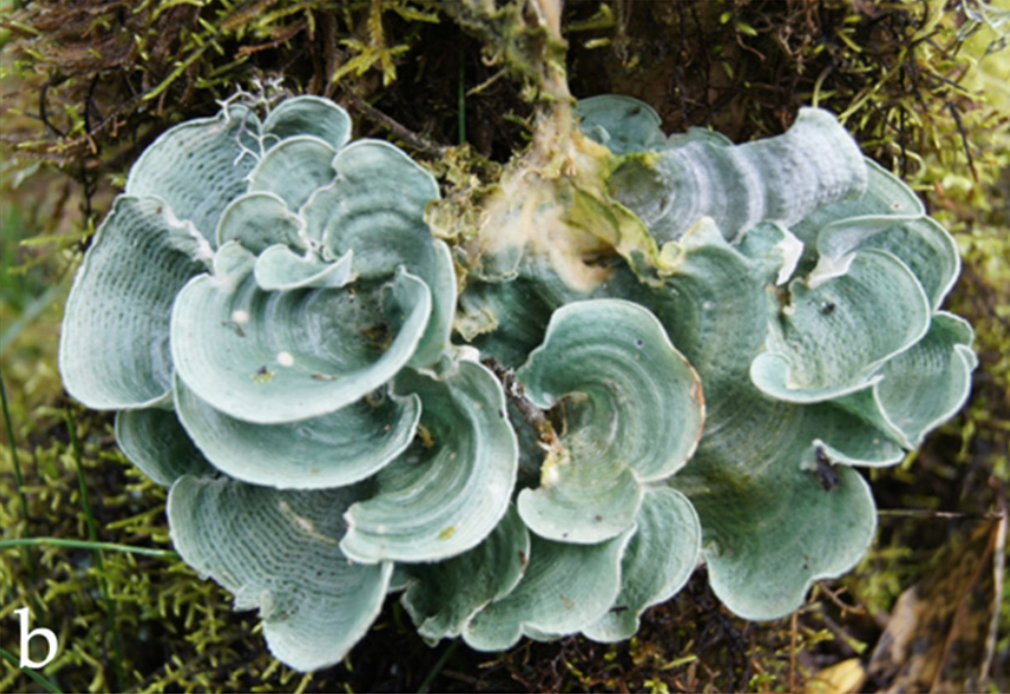

Scientific classification
- Kingdom: Fungi
- Division: Basidiomycota
- Class: Agaricomycetes
- Order: Agaricales
- Family: Hygrophoraceae
- Genus: Cora
- Species: C. cyphellifera

Binomial name
- Cora cyphellifera Dal-Forno, Bungartz & Lücking (2013)

= Cora cyphellifera =

Species of lichen-forming fungus

Cora cyphellifera is a species of basidiolichen in the family Hygrophoraceae. Found in northern Ecuador, it was formally described as a new species in 2013 by Manuela Dal-Forno, Frank Bungartz, and Robert Lücking. The type specimen was collected near the entrance to the Alto Choco Reserve (in Cotacachi Canton, Ecuadorian Andes) at an elevation of 2,053 m (6,736 ft). Here, in open, disturbed forest patches, the lichen grows as an epiphyte on tree branches and twigs, forming foliose, light bluish-green thalli up to 15 cm (6 in) across, and comprising 20 to 30 semicircular lobes in each thallus. Cora cyphellifera is only known to occur at the type locality, which is a montane rainforest. The specific epithet refers to the unusual cyphelloid structure (i.e., with concavities or pits in the surface) of the thallus; this characteristic is otherwise unknown in the genus Cora. According to the authors, "it almost looks like the lichenized thallus is parasitized by a non-lichenized, cyphelloid mushroom".
