= Hymenophore =

Fungal structure bearing hymenium

A hymenophore refers to the hymenium-bearing structure of a fungal fruiting body. Hymenophores can be smooth surfaces, lamellae, folds, tubes, or teeth. The term was coined by Robert Hooke in 1665.
