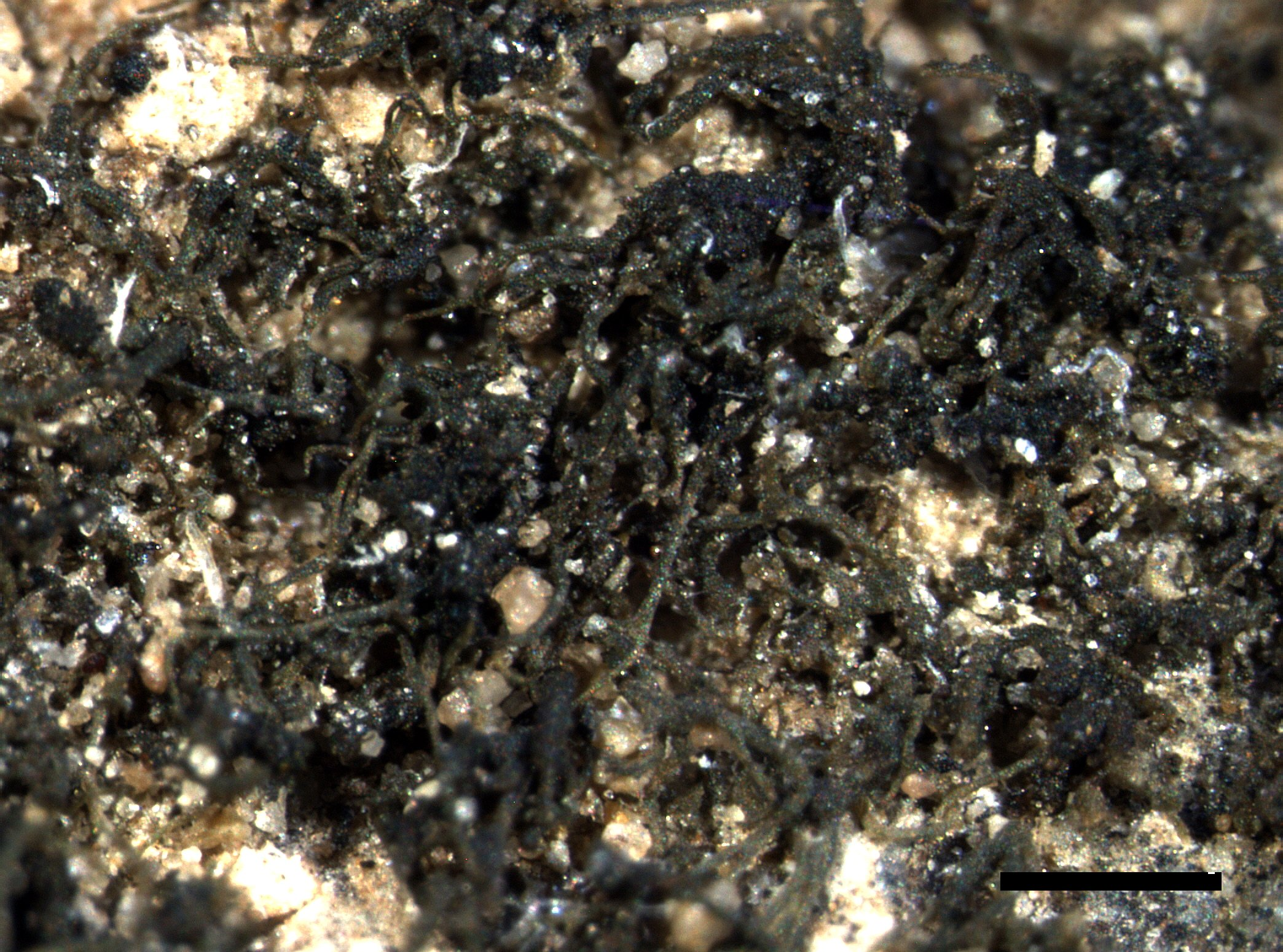
- Zahlbrucknerella calcarea

Scientific classification
- Domain: Eukaryota
- Kingdom: Fungi
- Division: Ascomycota
- Class: Lichinomycetes
- Order: Lichinales
- Family: Lichinaceae
- Genus: Zahlbrucknerella; Herre (1912)

Type species
- Zahlbrucknerella calcarea (Herre) Herre (1912)

Synonyms
- Zahlbrucknera Herre (1910); Lecanephebe Frey (1929); Leptopterygium Zahlbr. (1930)

= Zahlbrucknerella =

Genus of lichens

Zahlbrucknerella is a genus of filamentous, rock-dwelling lichens in the family Lichinaceae.

== Taxonomy ==
The genus was circumscribed by Albert William Herre in 1912. He had originally published the genus in 1910 as Zahlbrucknera, but later discovered that this name had already been used for a genus of flowering plants, and was thus not available for use. The genus is named for Alexander Zahlbruckner, "the eminent lichenologist, curator of the botanical section of the Imperial Natural History Museum, at Vienna, Austria". Aino Henssen emended the genus in 1977, adding five newly described species in the process.

== Description ==
All species of Zahlbrucknerella have filamentous thallus that forms olive, brown, or black tufts on rocks that are periodically inundated with water, like those in seepage channels or on the side of lakes and rivers. The photobiont partner is from the genus Scytonema. Unlike other genera in the Lichinaceae, the ascocarp of Zahlbrucknerella is not in the form of pycnoascocarps, but rather is a mass of generative tissue. Most species have 24 ascospores in their asci, while one has 8. Other Lichinaceae genera with a similar appearance, and with which Zahlbrucknerella has historically been confused, include Ephebe, Placynthium, and Spilonema.

== Species ==
Most species in the genus have a limited range, although the type species has a world-wide distribution.

- Zahlbrucknerella africana Henssen (1977) – South Africa
- Zahlbrucknerella calcarea (Herre) Zahlbr. (1924) – Asia; Europe; Iceland; South Africa; North America
- Zahlbrucknerella californica Henssen (1977) – California
- Zahlbrucknerella compacta Henssen (2004) – New Zealand
- Zahlbrucknerella fabispora Henssen (1977) – Colorado; Iceland; Karelia
- Zahlbrucknerella granitica Sambo (1932)
- Zahlbrucknerella indica D.D.Awasthi & S.R.Singh (1979) – India
- Zahlbrucknerella marionensis Henssen (1985) – Marion Island, Indian Ocean
- Zahlbrucknerella maritima Henssen (1963) – Patagonia; Tierra del Fuego
- Zahlbrucknerella maxima Henssen (1977) – Venezuela
- Zahlbrucknerella patagonica Henssen (1977) – Patagonia; Antarctica

== Species interactions ==
Lichenicolous fungi that have been recorded on Zahlbrucknerella lichens include Stigmidium parvum, Didymella parvispora, and Endococcus zahlbrucknerellae.
