= Zahlbrucknerella californica =

Scientific classification
- Kingdom: Fungi
- Division: Ascomycota
- Class: Lichinomycetes
- Order: Lichinales
- Family: Lichinaceae
- Genus: Zahlbrucknerella
- Species: Z. californica

Binomial name
- Zahlbrucknerella californica Henssen (1977)

Species of lichen

Zahlbrucknerella californica is a species of lichen in the family Lichinaceae. This rare lichen forms tiny blackish tufts or rosettes 3–5 millimeters across, made up of delicate branching filaments that grow on volcanic rock surfaces. It is found only in the fog-shrouded mountains of northern California, where it grows in drainage channels and moist rock crevices.

== Taxonomy ==
Zahlbrucknerella californica was described as a new species of filamentous lichen by Aino Henssen in 1977. The holotype specimen was collected on volcanic rock at Pine Ridge Summit in Humboldt County, California, and duplicate specimens were deposited in several major herbaria. Henssen placed the species in the "maritima group" of Zahlbrucknerella, a set of taxa distinguished by a dark-green spore-bearing disc (apothecium) or pycnidial opening and by a reticulate (net-like) arrangement of the fungal threads (hyphae) within the lichen body. Within that group Z. californica is most readily separated from its look-alike Z. calcarea by the green color of its apothecial disc and pycnidial ostiole, as well as by the formation of a layer of rounded cells that thickens into a rudimentary lower cortex in mature parts of the thallus.

== Description ==
Thalli (lichen bodies) form small blackish tufts or rosettes only 3–5 mm across, although individual filaments may creep beyond the main tuft. Each filament is 1–2 mm long and 40–100 μm thick at the base, tapering to 10–40 μm toward the tips; the paired branches characteristically curve inward, and their tips eventually split apart—a branching pattern induced by the looped growth of the associated cyanobacterium (Scytonema). Tiny holdfasts anchor both the basal and upper portions of the filaments to the rock. In cross-section the young hyphae are angular, but they round off and cluster with age, producing an irregular lower cortex whose cell cavities (lumina) can reach 25 μm in length.

Reproductive structures are poorly developed in the known material. Only juvenile apothecia have been observed; their discs are deep green, matching the dark-green ostioles (pore openings) of the flask-shaped asexual structures (pycnidia). Pycnidia measure up to 0.1 mm in diameter and release rod-shaped conidia (asexual spores) just 1.5–2.5 μm long. The photobiont (Scytonema) forms straight trichomes 5–6 μm wide in the filament tips; toward the thallus base the trichomes twist, and individual algal cells can swell to 10–15 μm, contributing to the lichen's gelatinous texture.

== Habitat and distribution ==
The lichen was discovered in drainage channels on volcanic rock within the fog belt of California's northern Coast Range. Henssen also noted that, like Z. africana, the species favors volcanic substrates, in contrast to the limestone-dwelling Z. calcarea. At the type site it grows alongside other moisture-tolerant crusts such as Koerberia sonomensis, Phylliscum demangeonii, Phylliscum tenue, and Spilonema revertens. No additional localities have been reported, and the species is considered endemic to this single Californian mountain pass.

== Species interactions ==
Endococcus zahlbrucknerellae is a lichenicolous (lichen-dwelling) fungus that is only known from the type collection made on Zahlbrucknerella californica in Humboldt County.
