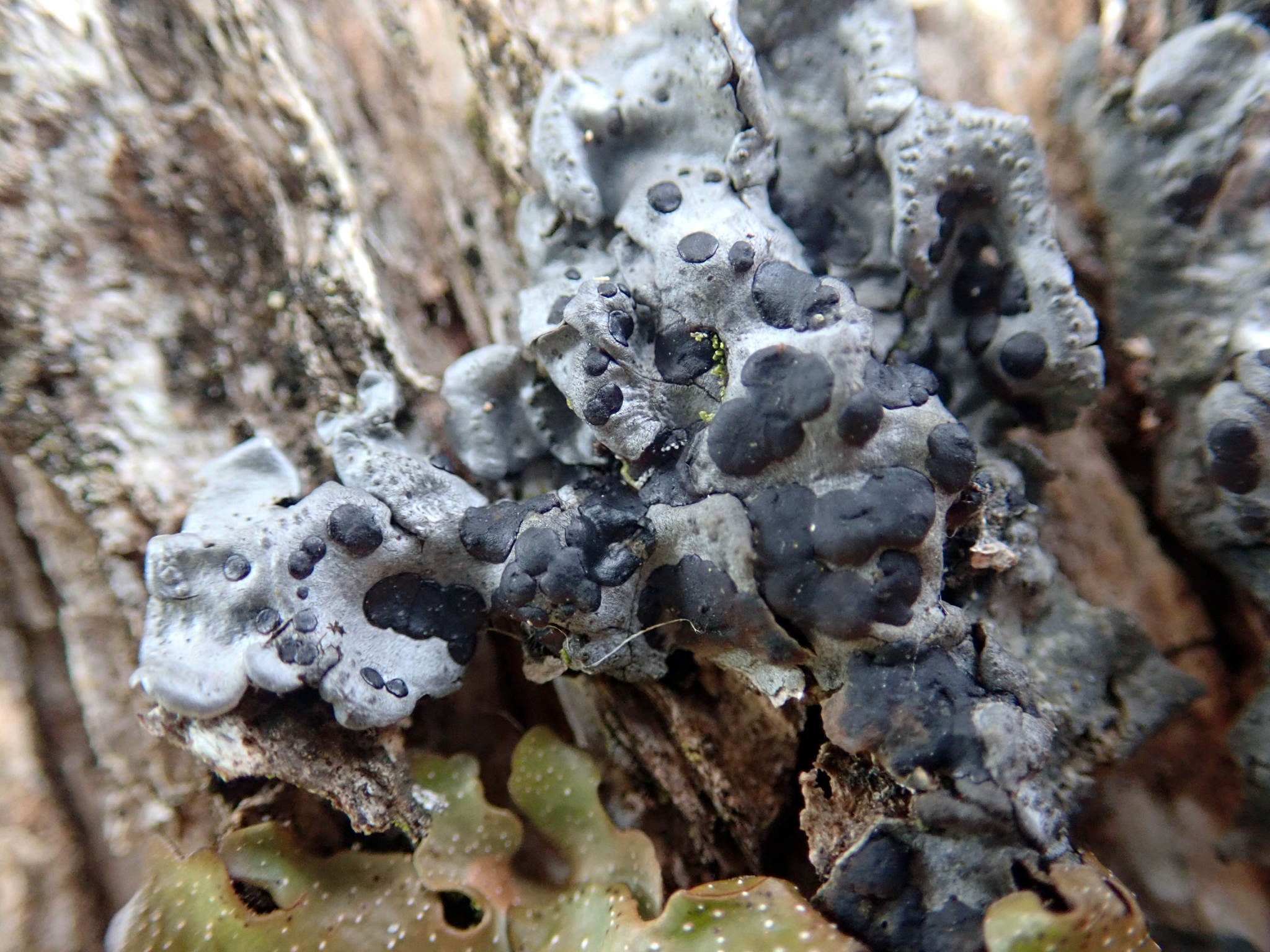
- Coccocarpia erythroxyli

Scientific classification
- Kingdom: Fungi
- Division: Ascomycota
- Class: Lecanoromycetes
- Order: Peltigerales
- Family: Coccocarpiaceae
- Genus: Coccocarpia; Pers. (1827)

Type species
- Coccocarpia molybdaea Pers. (1827)

Species
- See text

Synonyms
- Circinaria Fée (1825); Vischia C.W.Dodge (1971)

= Coccocarpia =

Genus of lichen-forming fungi

Coccocarpia is a genus of lichen-forming fungi in the family Coccocarpiaceae. Recent genetic studies suggest the genus originated in the Australasia–Oceania region during the Late Cretaceous period, roughly 76–100 million years ago, and later spread to Asia and the Americas. Some South American lineages are thought to have reached the continent via warm rainforest corridors that crossed Antarctica during the Palaeogene period, around 50–60 million years ago.

The genus is far more diverse than previously recognised, with ongoing research indicating it may contain over 200 species, and possibly more than 300, as many familiar names actually represent multiple distinct evolutionary lineages that are morphologically similar. These lichens typically grow as leaf-like structures in humid tropical forests around the world, with most species displaying a dull blue-grey upper surface and reddish-brown to nearly black disc-shaped fruiting bodies. Unlike many lichens that partner with green algae, Coccocarpia species associate with cyanobacteria of the genus Rhizonema.

== Taxonomy and systematics ==
The genus was first proposed by Christiaan Hendrik Persoon in 1827. He did not indicate a type species; Rolf Santesson designated Coccocarpia molybdaea as the type in 1952. The genus was placed in its own family, Coccocarpiaceae, by Aino Henssen in 1963. She based this decision on the distinctive way the fruiting bodies develop: they begin as tiny initial structures (primordia) with upright female organs (ascogonia) that often have projecting threads (trichogynes), all forming within a tissue of loosely connected cells (paraplectenchyma). Coccocarpiaceae, as then circumscribed, comprised Coccocarpia, Peltularia, Spilonema and Steinera.

A 2025 publication assembled the first global, multilocus phylogeny for Coccocarpia and recovered the genus as monophyletic within the Peltigerales; earlier conflict over the position of Spilonema is interpreted as a sampling issue, with the most recent broader analyses placing Coccocarpia and Spilonema as sister genera. The same study consistently resolved three well-supported lineages with strong geographic structure: a paleotropical clade, a neotropical clade, and a pantropical clade. Within these clades, several familiar, broadly defined names—especially C. erythroxyli, C. palmicola, and C. pellita—do not form single natural lineages, indicating that traditional morphogroups reflect convergence rather than shared ancestry. They further suggest the genus may ultimately comprise well over 200 species, and possibly exceed 300, once global sampling and formal revisions are complete.

== Evolution and biogeography ==
Using a dated phylogenetic tree, the study estimates that crown group Coccocarpia began diversifying about 86 ± 13 million years ago (Late Cretaceous). The earliest split separates a mainly Old World tropical lineage (Paleotropics) from the ancestor of the Neotropical and pantropical lineages. Ancestral-area modelling favours an origin in Australasia-Oceania (about 74% likelihood) during the Late Cretaceous (roughly 76–100 million years ago), followed by spread into Asia and later into the Americas. The authors suggest that some Neotropical lineages may have reached South America via warm rainforest corridors across Antarctica during the Palaeogene. They estimate the Neotropical and pantropical lineages diverged around 65 ± 10 million years ago, with most diversification in the Neotropical clade from about 53 ± 8 million years ago and early dispersal into the Caribbean by about 49 million years ago.

== Description ==
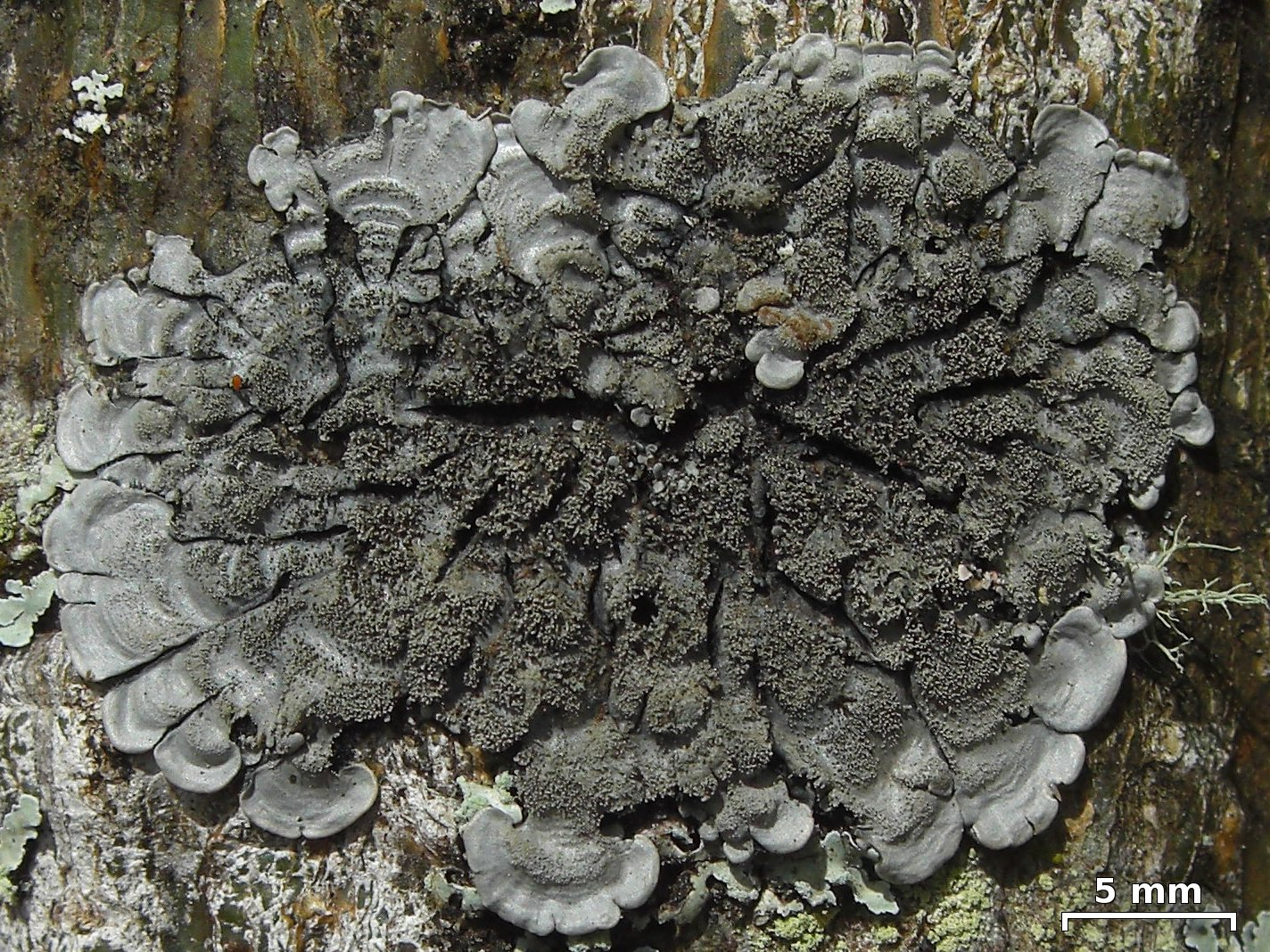
Coccocarpia palmicola

Coccocarpia lichens are usually foliose (leaf-like), though some species form small, scale-like squamules. Thalli are thin (to about 0.23 mm), typically forming rosettes 1–8(–15) cm across that sit tightly to loosely on the substrate. Lobes are fan-shaped, wedge-shaped, or narrow and radiating; tips are commonly slightly thickened and bent downwards. Soredia and pseudocyphellae are absent. Some species produce minute surface outgrowths used for vegetative spread (isidia) or small lobules. The upper surface is usually dull blue-grey, but can be greenish or brownish, and only rarely yellow. It ranges from smooth to finely roughened or wrinkled, often with concentric ridges and faint radiating striations; a light, frosted bloom (pruina) is occasional. A thin, pore-bearing skin (epicortex) is usually present. The lower surface has a cortex (skin-like outer layer), is pale cream to brown or black, and is anchored by dense, simple rhizines—fine, root-like holdfasts—that may project beyond the margin and can be dense enough to form a hypothallus.

The photosynthetic partner is a cyanobacterium of the genus Rhizonema; its cells are roughly spherical to ellipsoid (roughly spherical to oval), 6–14 μm wide, occurring in clusters or as short filaments aligned parallel to the thallus surface. Older literature reported the partner as Scytonema, but many of those records have since been re-interpreted as Rhizonema based on newer work.

Sexual fruiting bodies are apothecia that lack a thalline rim (biatorine). They sit broadly attached to the surface, often appearing rimless, and may show a few scattered white hairs protruding from beneath. The disc is flat to slightly convex and reddish-brown, sometimes darkening towards black. The proper exciple (the apothecial rim tissue) is extremely reduced—at most a thin, pale border—and in section is hyaline (colourless), cup-shaped, and built of robust, radiating, brick-like tissue (paraplectenchyma) with cells to about 5 μm wide. The layer beneath (hypothecium) is usually pale yellowish and poorly set off from the exciple. The hymenium (spore-bearing layer) is hyaline or faintly pigmented at the top and gives an amyloid reaction in iodine (I+ blue; KI+ blue). Paraphyses are mostly simple and stout, 2–5 μm wide; their tips can be slightly swollen, with a pigmented cap and a subtly beaded outline. Asci are club-shaped to cylindrical, eight-spored, with amyloid walls, a strongly amyloid apical cap, and a well-developed but only weakly amyloid tholus that contains an intensely amyloid, roughly horseshoe-shaped ring; a small ocular chamber is usually visible. Ascospores are simple (non-septate), hyaline, broadly ellipsoid to fusiform (spindle-shaped), thin-walled, and lack a clear halo; oil droplets are often visible. Asexual structures (pycnidia) are immersed in the thallus surface or margin, producing short, rod-shaped conidia that are only a few micrometres long (typically about 2–4 × 1 μm, though longer ranges have been reported in some regional accounts). Most species lack detectable secondary metabolites; where present, compounds such as fallacinal or lichexanthone are occasional and geographically patchy.

== Habitat and distribution ==
The genus is chiefly pantropical to subtropical, with outliers in moist temperate regions, and grows mostly on bark but also on rock and soil; a few species are foliicolous (leaf-dwelling). Drawing on curated Global Biodiversity Information Facility (GBIF) records and the study's sampling, the genus is centred in humid tropical forests across the Americas, Africa, Asia and Oceania, with additional populations in extra-tropical regions that have high precipitation.

== Species ==
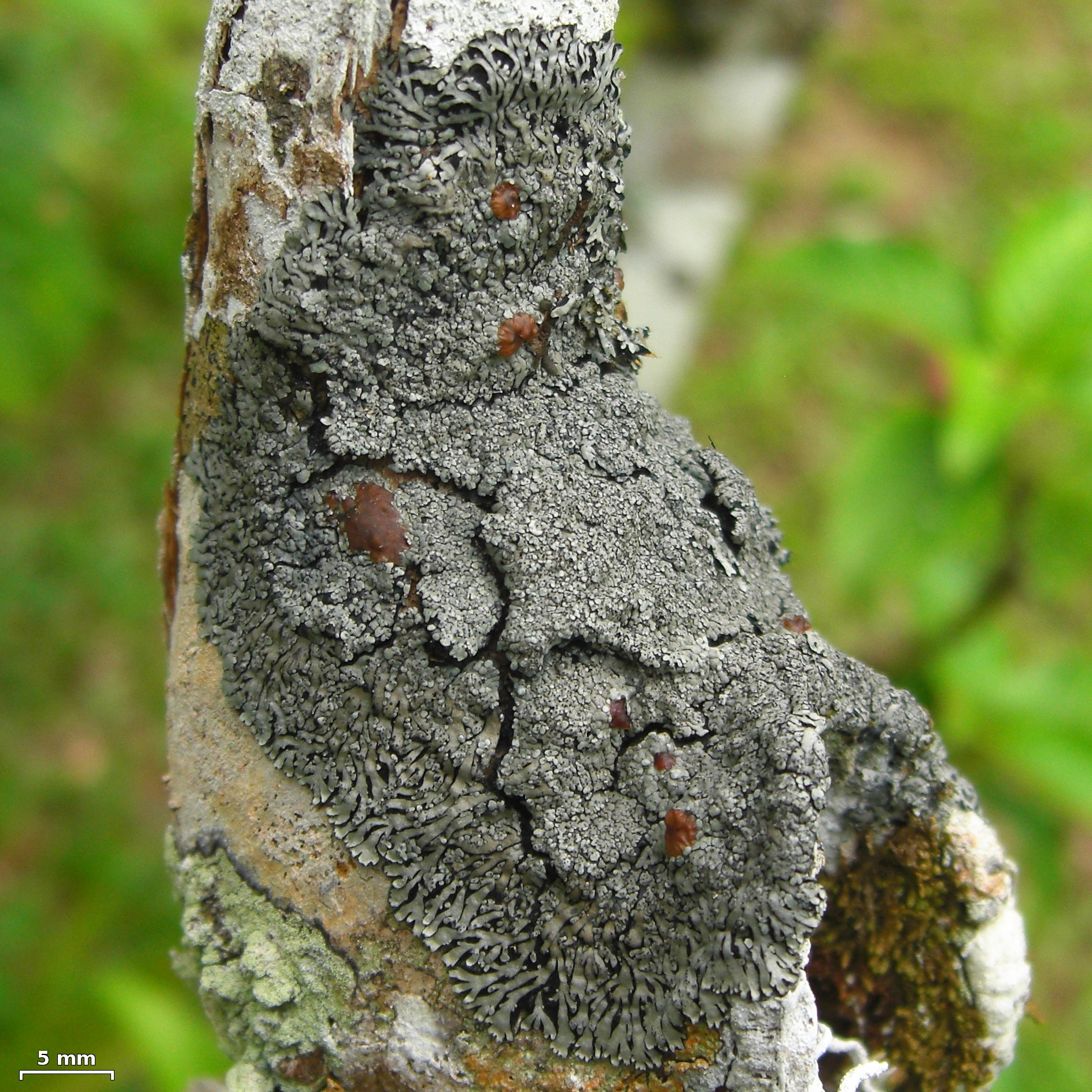
Coccocarpia pellita

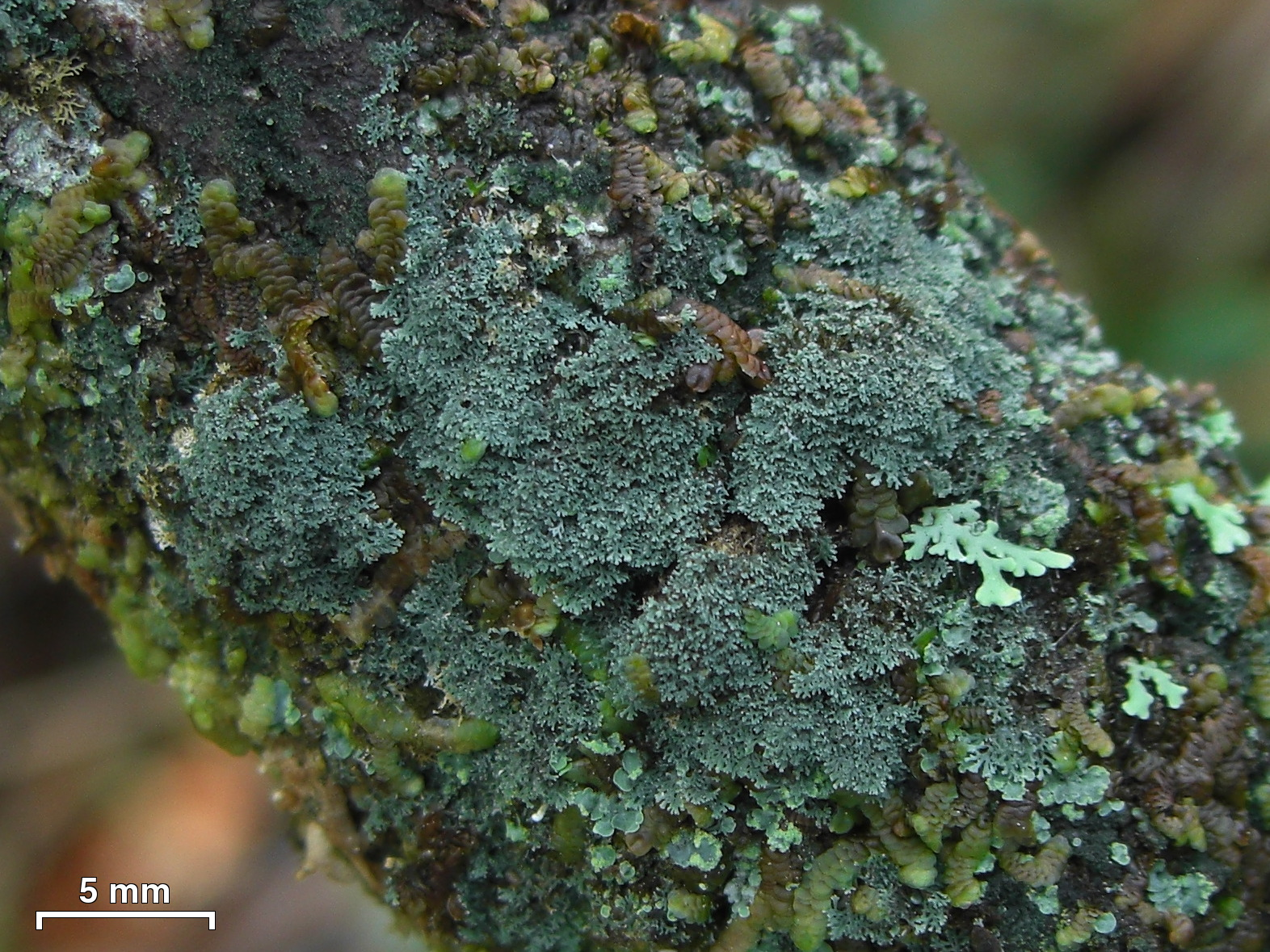
Coccocarpia prostrata

As of October 2025, Species Fungorum (in the Catalogue of Life) accepts 30 species of Coccocarpia.

- Coccocarpia adnata Arv. (1983) – Mauritius
- Coccocarpia aeruginosa Müll.Arg. (1887)
- Coccocarpia albida C.W.Dodge (1933)
- Coccocarpia aphthosa Jatta (1882)
- Coccocarpia azurella Nyl. (1883)
- Coccocarpia culatensis V.Marcano & A.Morales (1995)
- Coccocarpia divergens Kremp. (1875)
- Coccocarpia delicatula Bungartz, Ziemmeck & Lücking (2011)
- Coccocarpia dissecta Swinscow & Krog (1976)
- Coccocarpia domingensis Vain. (1915)
- Coccocarpia duidensis V.Marcano, Galiz & A.Morales (1995)
- Coccocarpia elegans Müll.Arg. (1881)
- Coccocarpia epitrypta Nyl. (1883)
- Coccocarpia erythroxyli (Spreng.) Swinscow & Krog (1976)
- Coccocarpia fenicis Vain. (1921)
- Coccocarpia fuscata Zahlbr. (1912)
- Coccocarpia gallaicoi Lücking, Chaves & L.Umaña (2007)
- Coccocarpia guimarana (Vain.) Swinscow & Krog (1976)
- Coccocarpia glaucina Kremp. (1875)
- Coccocarpia imbricascens Nyl. (1891)
- Coccocarpia kerguelensis C.W.Dodge (1948)
- Coccocarpia melloniorum Lücking (2011) – Philippines
- Coccocarpia microcarpa Räsänen (1944)
- Coccocarpia microphyllina Lücking & Aptroot (2007)
- Coccocarpia molybdaea Pers. (1827)
- Coccocarpia neglecta Aptroot & Lücking (2007)
- Coccocarpia palmicola (Spreng.) Arv. & D.J.Galloway (1979)
- Coccocarpia pellita (Ach.) Müll.Arg. (1882)
- Coccocarpia prostrata Lücking, Aptroot & Sipman (2007)
- Coccocarpia pruinosa Arv. (1983)
- Coccocarpia smaragdina Pers. (1827)
- Coccocarpia stellata Tuck. (1862)
- Coccocarpia subtilis Müll.Arg. (1892)
- Coccocarpia tenuissima Müll.Arg. (1883)
- Coccocarpia tomentosa L.I.Ferraro & Aptroot (2010) – Argentina
- Coccocarpia viridescens Pers. (1827)
