= Coccocarpia delicatula =

Scientific classification
- Domain: Eukaryota
- Kingdom: Fungi
- Division: Ascomycota
- Class: Lecanoromycetes
- Order: Peltigerales
- Family: Coccocarpiaceae
- Genus: Coccocarpia
- Species: C. delicatula

Binomial name
- Coccocarpia delicatula Bungartz, Ziemmeck & Lücking (2011)

Species of lichen

Coccocarpia delicatula is a species of foliicolous (leaf-dwelling) foliose lichen in the family Coccocarpiaceae. Known only from the Galápagos Islands and Réunion, it was described as new to science in 2011. Characterised by its rounded, foliose thallus and unique cylindrical isidia, this lichen is similar in appearance to Coccocarpia domingensis but has distinct differences in isidia shape and arrangement. Found on the bark and wood of dead twigs, Coccocarpia delicatula thrives in sunny, wind- and rain-exposed environments.

== Taxonomy ==
Coccocarpia delicatula was first described by lichenologists Frank Bungartz, Frauke Ziemmeck, and Robert Lücking in 2011. The type specimen was collected by the first author on San Cristóbal Island in 2008. The species name delicatula was chosen to highlight the delicate nature of the thallus compared to the more common Coccocarpia palmicola.

== Description ==
The thallus of Coccocarpia delicatula is foliicolous (growing on leaves) and foliose (leafy), with a rounded shape and diameter up to 10 mm. Its lobes are thin and flat, measuring 0.1–0.2 mm wide, linear but slightly widened towards the apex, and closely spaced. The upper surface of the lobes is blue-green when moist and plumbeous to bluish-grey when dry, featuring thin, white, longitudinal grooves.

Coccocarpia delicatula can be distinguished from similar species by its laminal, dense, uniformly cylindrical isidia that are mostly unbranched or bifurcate. The isidia measure 0.1–0.3 mm long and 0.05–0.1 mm thick, covering most of the thallus interior in mature specimens. No apothecia or pycnidia have been observed, and no secondary chemical substances were detected by thin-layer chromatography.

Coccocarpia delicatula is closely related to C. domingensis and C. neglecta, sharing similarities in narrow, linear thallus lobes and white longitudinal striae on the surface. The main differences between these species lie in the shape and arrangement of their isidia. Coccocarpia melloniorum is another Coccocarpia species with small thalli and narrow lobes bearing isidia; it has wider lobes than C. delicatula (up to 1 mm) and squamiform isidia.

== Habitat and distribution ==
Coccocarpia delicatula occurs in the Galápagos Islands, specifically in the transition zone on Sán Cristóbal Island. There it can be found on the bark and wood of dead twigs, thriving in sunny, wind- and rain-exposed environments. It has also been reported from Réunion, a remote tropical island in the Mascarene archipelago.
