= Zahlbrucknerella marionensis =

Scientific classification
- Kingdom: Fungi
- Division: Ascomycota
- Class: Lichinomycetes
- Order: Lichinales
- Family: Lichinaceae
- Genus: Zahlbrucknerella
- Species: Z. marionensis

Binomial name
- Zahlbrucknerella marionensis Henssen (1985)

Lichen species

Zahlbrucknerella marionensis is a species of filamentous lichen in the family Lichinaceae. It is known only from Marion Island in the southern Indian Ocean, where it grows on lava boulders along rivers. The species was described in 1985 by the German lichenologist Aino Henssen, who named it after its type locality.

== Taxonomy ==
Zahlbrucknerella marionensis was described by Aino Henssen in 1985 following its discovery during a South African–supported expedition to the Prince Edward Islands. The genus Zahlbrucknerella belongs to the Lichinaceae, a family of lichens that typically partner with cyanobacteria rather than green algae as their photosynthetic symbionts. Within the genus, Z. marionensis shares traits with the maritima group, such as the dark green colouring of the pycnidial ostiole (the pore of its asexual reproductive structures) and a net-like arrangement of fungal filaments in the thallus. However, it also has a persistent basal strand (a compact bundle of fungal hyphae at the base of each filament) characteristic of the calcarea group. This combination of features makes the species morphologically intermediate between the two recognised groups in the genus.

== Description ==
The lichen forms small, tufted or rosette-like colonies 5–10 mm across, firmly attached to the rock surface. Its thallus is filamentous and dark olivaceous to blackish in colour. Individual filaments measure about 3–5 mm long and 20–60 micrometres (μm) thick, with the basal portion reaching up to 100 μm in thickness. Each filament consists of a basal strand made up of 1–3 rows of angular fungal cells, while the upper parts form a loose net of cells linked by very thin connections. The photobiont (photosynthetic partner) is a species of Scytonema, a cyanobacterium whose threads (trichomes) are often twisted. No sexual fruiting bodies (apothecia) have been observed, but the species produces lateral pycnidia roughly 60 μm wide, each with a dark green ostiole. These pycnidia release conidia (asexual spores) measuring 3.0–3.5 × 1.0 μm.

== Habitat and distribution ==
Zahlbrucknerella marionensis is so far known only from two sites on Marion Island. It grows directly on grey lava boulders within river channels, often alongside the lichen Hertella subantarctica. The parallel alignment of the filaments in most thalli suggests that the lichen is regularly flooded by moving water, but it is above the river's water level.
