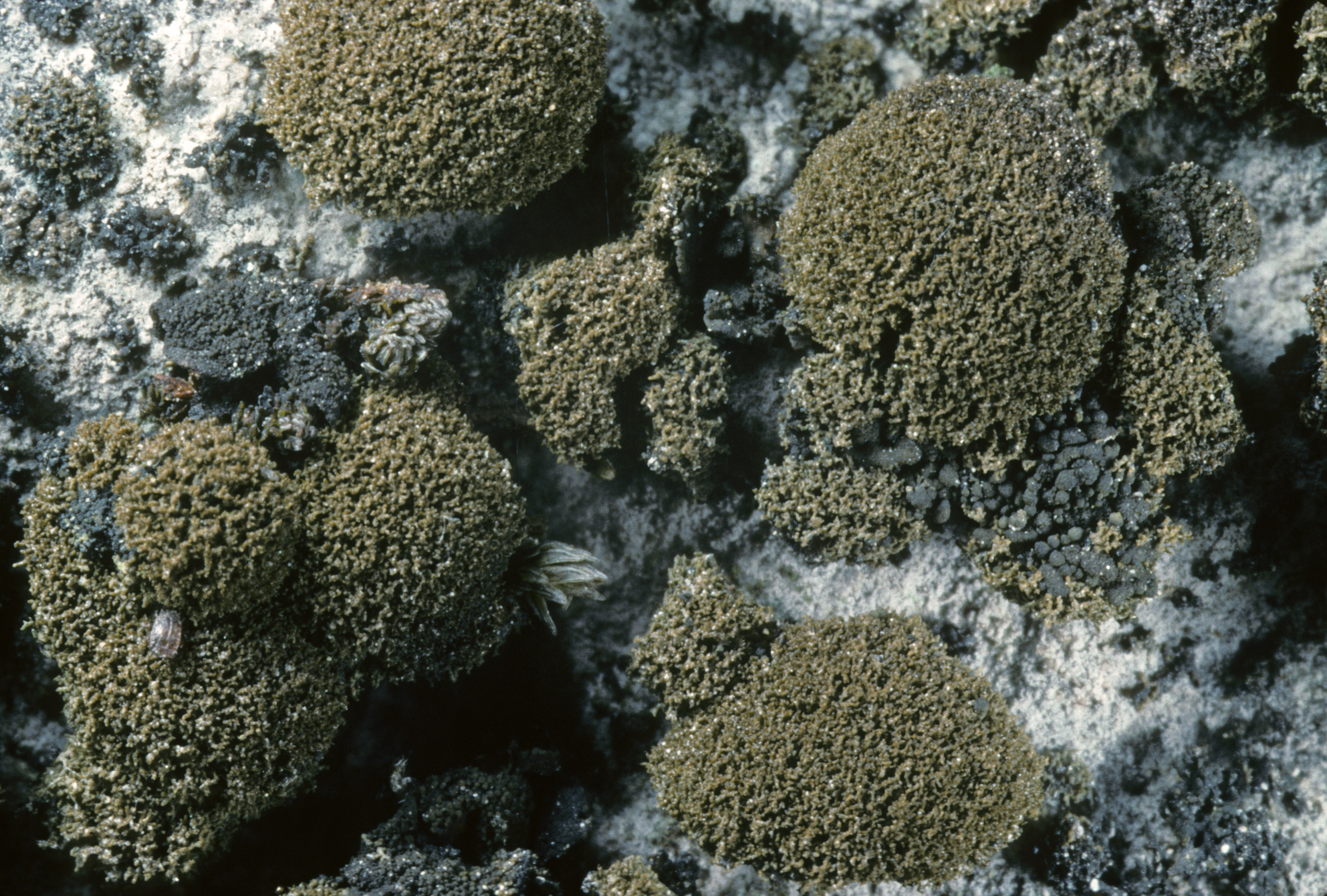
- Spilonema revertens

Scientific classification
- Kingdom: Fungi
- Division: Ascomycota
- Class: Lecanoromycetes
- Order: Peltigerales
- Family: Coccocarpiaceae
- Genus: Spilonema; Bornet (1856)

Type species
- Spilonema paradoxum Bornet (1856)

Species
- S. americanum S. japonicum S. paradoxum S. maritimum S. revertens

Synonyms
- Asirosiphon Nyl. (1872); Spilonemella Henssen & Tønsberg (2000); Spilonemopsis Vain. (1909)

= Spilonema =

Genus of lichen

Spilonema is a genus of lichen-forming fungi in the family Coccocarpiaceae. These lichens form small, dark tufts of thread-like filaments that grow on rocks and are found in various regions from tropical to arctic climates. They partner with nitrogen-fixing cyanobacteria, which gives them their distinctive blue-green colouration and allows them to survive in nutrient-poor environments. The genus was established in 1856 by the French botanist Jean-Baptiste Édouard Bornet, who distinguished these species from similar-looking lichens based on their unique internal structure.

== Taxonomy ==
The genus Spilonema was circumscribed by Jean-Baptiste Édouard Bornet in 1856. He established the genus to accommodate lichens with distinctive morphological characteristics that set them apart from the closely related genus Stigonema (now Ephebe). In his original description, he characterised the genus as having a cylindrical, branched thallus with a cellular internal structure. The thallus contains large transverse granules and bears lecideine apothecium. The paraphyses are robust, clavate (club-shaped), and articulate, whilst the spermogonia are closed. The spore-bearing structures (asci) are elongated and divided into segments, and the pycnidia are oblong.

The type species, S. paradoxum, was described from specimens collected on granitic rocks near Cannes, particularly in somewhat humid locations. Bornet noted that this species forms short tufts of a blackish-olive colour, closely resembling Ephebe pubescens. The thallus filaments, measuring no more than two millimetres in height, are densely packed, flexuous, and often curved in an arc shape with varying degrees of branching.

Bornet distinguished Spilonema from Stigonema primarily based on differences in cellular organisation within the thallus. Whilst Stigonema species have a homogeneous tube structure containing large photobiont cells, Spilonema species lack the interpolated cellular tissue between the photobiont cells that characterises Stigonema. The cortical portion of Stigonema is smooth and homogeneous, whereas Spilonema filaments present an areolate (divided into small polygonal areas) surface structure.

== Description ==
Spilonema produces minute, dark tufts that look either filamentous or finely shrubby. Each black filament is constructed around a central strand of cyanobacterial cells—both Stigonema and Scytonema are photobionts—which are wrapped in an irregular, brick‑like sheath of fungal hyphae. These filaments anchor to the substrate by blue‑green, rhizine‑like hyphae that turn purple‑red when treated with the standard nitrile (N) spot test.

The lichen's sexual fruiting bodies (apothecia) develop laterally on the filaments and sit directly on the surface (sessile). They are brown to black, convex to almost spherical, and internally pigmented green or violet; both pigments react red in the N test. No rim of thallus tissue surrounds the disc, but a thin proper exciple of radiating fungal cells is present. The hymenium itself is blue‑green to violet and stains blue with iodine (I+). Stout, branched paraphyses thread through this layer; they are divided by cross‑walls and terminate in pointed tips. Cylindrical asci contain eight ascospores and show a blue‑staining apical dome in the combined potassium–iodide test (K/I+). The ascospores are colourless, narrowly ellipsoidal, single‑celled, and thin‑walled.

Asexual reproduction occurs in small, black pycnidia that sit on the filament surface. Their walls are green‑black and give a red reaction to the N test. Short, chain‑forming conidiogenous cells produce rod‑shaped (bacilliform), colourless conidia. Thin-layer chromatography has not detected any characteristic secondary metabolites in the genus.

== Species ==
- Spilonema americanum (Henssen & Tønsberg) T.Sprib., Tønsberg & Muggia (2014)
- Spilonema japonicum (Henssen) T.Sprib., Tønsberg & Muggia (2014)
- Spilonema maritimum T.Sprib. & Fryday (2020) – Alaska
- Spilonema paradoxum Bornet (1856)
- Spilonema revertens Nyl. (1865)
