= Zahlbrucknerella africana =

Scientific classification
- Kingdom: Fungi
- Division: Ascomycota
- Class: Lichinomycetes
- Order: Lichinales
- Family: Lichinaceae
- Genus: Zahlbrucknerella
- Species: Z. africana

Binomial name
- Zahlbrucknerella africana Henssen (1977)

Species of lichen

Zahlbrucknerella africana is a little-known species of lichen in the family Lichinaceae. It was first described in 1977 from specimens collected on wet volcanic rock in the mountains of Lesotho, where it forms shiny olive-black tufts of thread-like filaments. The species is distinguished by its brown fruiting bodies that contain unusually large numbers of spores, and it grows exclusively on permanently damp volcanic rock faces rather than limestone. It remains known only from its original discovery location in the Drakensberg highlands of southern Africa.

== Taxonomy ==
Zahlbrucknerella africana was described as a new species of filamentous lichen by Aino Henssen in 1977, based on material collected on wet volcanic rock above Bushman's Pass in Lesotho (then Basutoland). Henssen placed it in the family Lichinaceae and designated it the type host of the lichen-dwelling (lichenicolous) fungus Didymella parvispora. Within the genus, Henssen grouped Z. africana in the "calcarea-group", a set of species characterised by brown (rather than dark-green) fruiting body discs and by a basal strand of fungal tissue that—although weaker here than in the limestone specialist Z. calcarea—persists in older parts of the filaments. The combination of a brown apothecial disc, frequently polyspored asci (usually 24–32 spores), and occurrence on volcanic rather than calcareous rock distinguishes Z. africana from others in its genus.

== Description ==
The lichen forms shiny olive-black tufts or individual creeping filaments, each thallus (the body of the lichen) measuring about 5–15 mm across. Individual filaments are 1–2 mm long; their tips are paired but usually separate, and the basal portions can reach 80–125 μm in diameter. A weak basal strand—essentially a cord of tightly packed hyphae (fungal threads) that runs along the lower surface—remains visible, and minute holdfasts fasten both the filament bases and some upper branches to the rock. The hyphae branch at right angles or in a loose net, weaving around trichomes of the cyanobacterial partner (Scytonema). Cells along the filament are mostly angular to cylindrical and only a few micrometres long.

Fertile specimens bear lateral apothecia up to 0.25 mm wide. Each fruiting body retains a narrow rim of thallus tissue and a brown disc. The hymenium (spore-producing layer) is 90–120 micrometres (μm) tall and sits over a thin hypothecium; an excipulum (outer wall) is rudimentary or absent. Asci are cylindrical to club-shaped, 60–96 × 14.5–17 μm, and typically contain 24–32 colourless ascospores. The spores are simple (non-septate), ellipsoid to spherical (globose), sometimes slightly curved with a median constriction known as a plasma bridge, and measure 5.5–9.5 × 4.5–6 μm. Pycnidia (minute flask-shaped asexual structures) are about 0.1 mm across with a brown ostiole; they release rod-shaped conidia 2.5–3.5 × 1 μm. The shining filaments, frequent polyspory, and only weakly developed basal strand together give the species a habit intermediate between the robust Z. calcarea and the dark-green-disc species of the maritima group.

== Habitat and distribution ==
The holotype specimen was collected on a vertical, permanently wet face of volcanic rock in the Maloti (Drakensberg) highlands of Lesotho. Elsewhere in the monograph Henssen records that Z. africana, unlike the limestone-loving Z. calcarea, prefers volcanic substrates. The lichen is known only from this type locality in South Africa/Lesotho. Field observations note its occurrence alongside water-tolerant lichens such asPeltula and Heppia on perpetually damp rock faces.

== Species interactions ==
Didymella parvispora is a lichenicolous (lichen-dwelling) fungus that has been reported growing on the thallus of Z. africana. Its pycnidia are partially immersed, elongate, 30–50 μm broad, with a dark brown ostiole, and elongate conidiogenous cells giving rise to bacilliform, hyaline conidia 1.5—2 x 0.5—1 μm.
