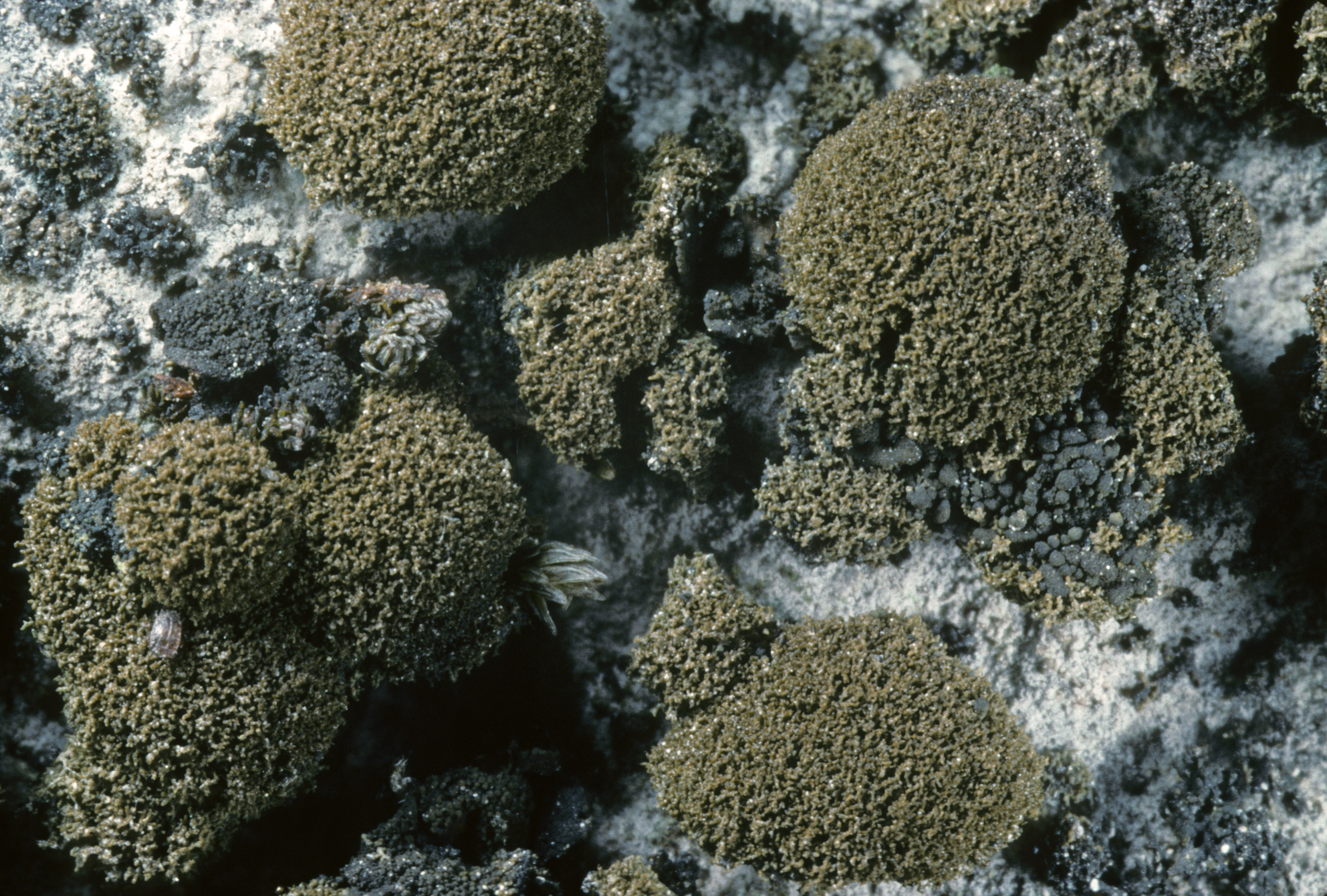

Conservation status
- Apparently Secure (NatureServe)

Scientific classification
- Kingdom: Fungi
- Division: Ascomycota
- Class: Lecanoromycetes
- Order: Peltigerales
- Family: Coccocarpiaceae
- Genus: Spilonema
- Species: S. revertens

Binomial name
- Spilonema revertens Nyl. (1865)

Synonyms
- Spilonemopsis revertens (Nyl.) Vain. (1909)

= Spilonema revertens =

Species of lichen

Spilonema revertens, the rock hairball lichen, is a species of fruticose lichen in the family Coccocarpiaceae. This dark-coloured cyanolichen forms small, dense cushions on rocks across the Northern Hemisphere. Found in Europe, Asia, North America, Macaronesia, and Greenland, it typically grows on exposed rocks that experience alternating wet and dry periods. The species is most commonly found in lower mountain zones, particularly in open coniferous forests and rocky steppes, though it also occurs in coastal areas. First described in 1865 from specimens collected in Finland, it is distinctive for its minute, branching filaments that create cushion-like structures and for its role as the exclusive host of the parasitic lichen Psorula rufonigra. Unlike many other rock-dwelling lichens, it shows a preference for sheltered locations on rock faces and tends to grow in scattered, small patches rather than forming extensive coverage.

== Taxonomy ==
Spilonema revertens was first described by the Finnish lichenologist William Nylander based on specimens discovered by Johan Petter Norrlin in 1863 from Asikkala, Finland. The species was found growing on granitic and mica-schist rocks. In his original description, Nylander noted the species' similarity to Sirosiphon saxicola but chose to retain it in Spilonema, arguing that Sirosiphon as a genus contained "too diffuse and vague elements" while Spilonema provided a more certain taxonomic placement. Edvard Vainio proposed transferring it to Spilonemopsis in 1909, but this invalidly published genus has since been folded into synonymy with Spilonema.

Molecular phylogenetics studies published in 2014 confirmed that S. revertens belongs in Spilonema and demonstrated its close relationship to the type species of the genus, S. paradoxum, within the family Coccocarpiaceae. The same study revealed that some species previously placed in Spilonema, such as S. dendroides, were only distantly related and required placement in a new genus. The core species of Spilonema, including S. revertens, form a strongly supported monophyletic group that shows a pattern of photobiont switching, with some closely related species associating with different genera of cyanobacteria.

In North America, S. revertens is commonly known as the "rock hairball lichen".

== Description ==
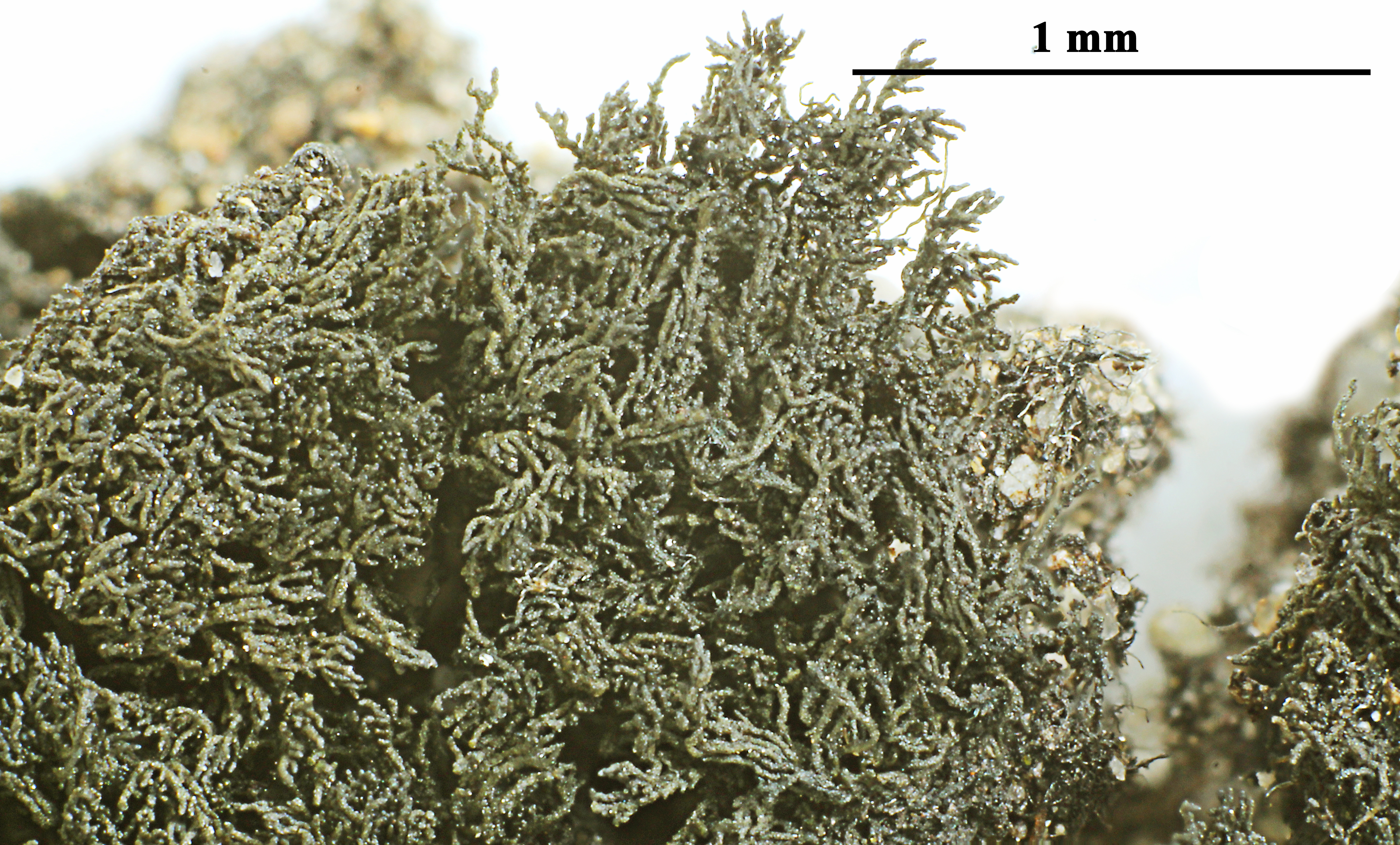
Closeup of the thallus showing fibrous structure comprising rhizine-like filaments

The thallus of Spilonema revertens forms dense cushions composed of minute, dark filaments. These cushions feature a distinctive structure: a dense central mass of rhizine-like filaments supports an outer layer of actively growing lichenized branches, allowing continuous regeneration of the lichen's outer layer. Its growth form varies from somewhat shrub-like (subfruticose) to tree-like (dendroid), consisting of tiny, upright lobules that occasionally spread out along the substrate. These lobules bear numerous minute side branches, forming rounded to angular, convex cushion-like structures. In some cases, the thallus may fragment into small, crust-like (areolate) patches, giving it a more encrusting appearance. The lichen attaches to the rock surface via a hypothallus, a network of interwoven bluish-black fungal filaments, which becomes gelatinous when wet.

The upper surface of the thallus is typically dark olive to blackish in colour, often appearing rough or granular, though it is rarely shiny. Internally, S. revertens has a uniform structure (homoiomerous) composed of densely packed thick-walled fungal filaments and lacks a distinct outer protective layer (ecorticate). Near the base, the tissue may adopt a more organized, paraplectenchymatous (brick-like) arrangement. This lichen forms a symbiotic relationship with a filamentous cyanobacterium, usually from the genera Stigonema or Hyphomorpha, but lacks a secondary algal partner. The lower surface varies in colour from dark blue-green to brownish or dark purple, often appearing nearly black due to the pigmentation of the hypothallus.

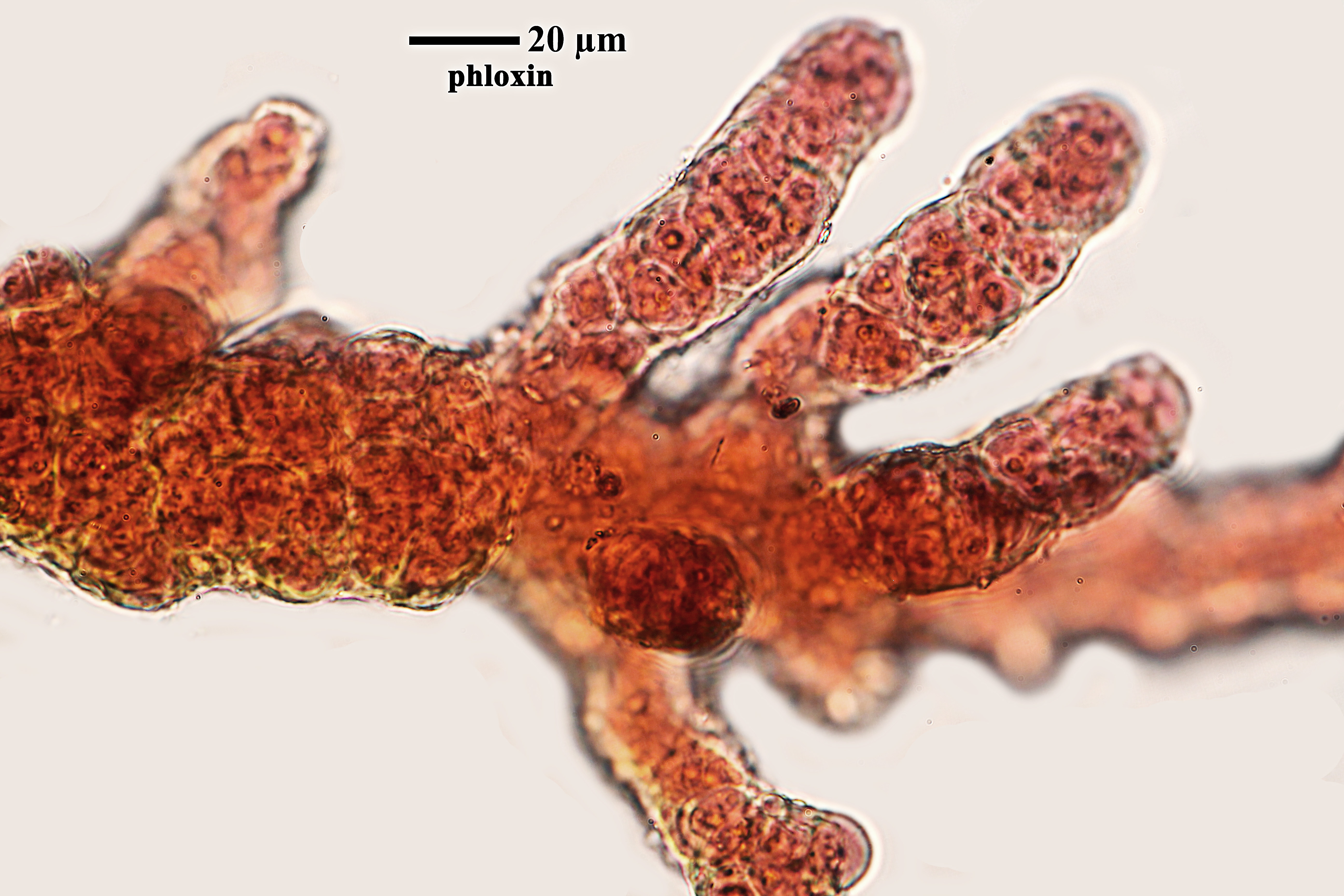
Micrograph of rhizine-like filament stained with phloxine

The reproductive structures (ascomata) of S. revertens are small, disc-shaped fruiting bodies known as apothecia. These sessile structures develop laterally on the lobules, often hidden within the cushion-like formations. They are up to 0.5 mm in diameter, with a black, convex disc from an early stage. The fruiting bodies lack a distinct outer thalline margin. The surrounding exciple, initially violet in colour, is thin and eventually erodes away. Internally, the hymenium (fertile layer) appears greenish or partially violet and reacts with iodine, indicating an amyloid composition. The paraphyses—sterile filamentous structures among the spores—are robust, distinctly segmented, and have pointed tips. The hypothecium, located beneath the hymenium, is violet. The spore-producing structures (asci) are of the lecanoralean type, thick-walled with an iodine-reactive tip, and each contains eight spores. The ascospores themselves are initially simple but later develop septa. They are hyaline (transparent), ellipsoid, and measure 7–9(–11) × 2.5–3.5(–6) μm, with thin, colourless walls. Asexual reproduction occurs via small, globular, sessile pycnidia—structures that produce non-motile asexual spores (conidia). These conidia are rod-shaped or oval (bacilliform to ellipsoid), and approximately 2.5 × 1 μm in size.

When subjected to standard chemical spot tests, S. revertens does not show any colour changes, indicating a lack of detectable secondary metabolites.

== Similar species ==
Spilonema revertens is distinguished by its tiny, fruticose, ecorticate lobes and bluish-black hypothallus. While its close relative Spilonema paradoxum shares these features, S. paradoxum has less densely aggregated cushions, prostrate rather than erect lobes, and more exposed reproductive structures. Additionally, S. revertens serves as a host for the parasitic lichen Psorula rufonigra.

Several other lichen genera bear similarities to S. revertens but have distinguishing features. Species in the genera Ephebe and Lichinella do not develop a dark hypothallus and consistently possess a thalline margin surrounding their apothecia. The genus Thermutis also lacks a thalline apothecial margin, but it differs in its association with a Scytonema cyanobacterial photobiont, whose filaments are encased by fungal hyphae. Polychidium species appear superficially similar but can be recognized by their corticate lobes, which contrast with the ecorticate lobes of S. revertens.

== Habitat, distribution, and ecology ==
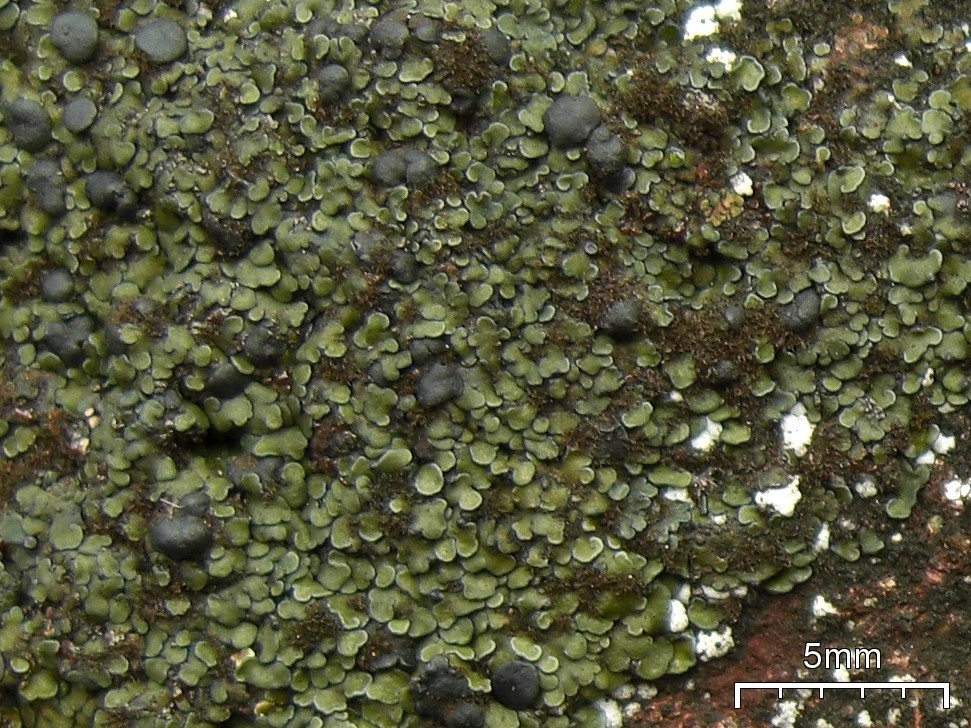
Close-up of Psorula rufonigra (green leafy lobes with dark apothecia) growing amongst and overgrowing its host Spilonema revertens (dark filamentous growth). Scale bar: 5 mm.

Spilonema revertens has a broad Holarctic distribution, occurring across Europe, Asia, North America, and Greenland. It has also been recorded from the Canary Islands. In Russia, it has been documented in the northern European part of the country, the Northern and Southern Urals, the North Caucasus, Southern and Eastern Siberia, and both the southern and northern regions of the Russian Far East, as well as in Mongolia. In Greenland, it typically occurs in association with Euopsis pulvinata and Lecanora chloroleprosa, especially on moist charnockitic rocks and siliceous gravel.

The species generally grows on exposed siliceous rock that undergoes alternating dry and wet periods. It is often encountered in lower mountain zones, particularly in light coniferous forests and stony meadow-steppes, but has also been documented on serpentine rocks and soils derived from peridotite. Such substrates feature low calcium-to-magnesium ratios, elevated concentrations of heavy metals, and nutrient deficiencies; however, S. revertens is not considered serpentine-specific because it is recorded on a variety of rock types.

Wave exposure influences its distribution in coastal environments. The species inhabits the middle supralittoral zone in sheltered areas, but retreats to the terrestrial zone in highly exposed sites, likely due to its relatively loose attachment making it vulnerable to wave action. Unlike many coastal lichens that can form extensive coverage, S. revertens typically grows in scattered, small patches, even when it is frequent.

A detailed investigation of rock-dwelling lichens in the Jonas rockslide area of Jasper National Park, Alberta, identified S. revertens as a dominant species. Within this habitat, it is most frequent on lower-altitude rockfaces with gentle slopes, minimal sunlight, and weathered, dark-coloured rock. Further analyses showed that it prefers the lower and more sheltered parts of rock faces, appearing much less often in upper, exposed areas. This microhabitat preference suggests an intolerance of more extreme temperature and moisture fluctuations. Its filamentous growth form makes it more likely to establish as an epiphyte on other lichens rather than acting as an initial colonizer, and it maintains relatively selective neighbour associations compared to a random distribution of species.

In the Mediterranean region of Spain, S. revertens is typically restricted to a few localities where microclimatic conditions resemble those in its main northern distribution. It favours humid, shaded sites on inclined slate rock faces and is often found alongside the lichens Ephebe lanata and Dermatocarpon luridum.

The relationship between S. revertens and the parasitic lichen Psorula rufonigra is noteworthy, as P. rufonigra relies exclusively on S. revertens as its host. Although S. revertens itself occupies a range of rock types, when the two species coexist, they are frequently observed on calcareous or calcareous-influenced substrates with inclined, moist surfaces. In coastal areas of North America, S. revertens serves as an ecological analogue to the fruticose lichen Lichina pygmaea, which is common in the British Isles but scarce along the eastern seaboard of the United States.
