= Zahlbrucknerella fabispora =

Scientific classification
- Kingdom: Fungi
- Division: Ascomycota
- Class: Lichinomycetes
- Order: Lichinales
- Family: Lichinaceae
- Genus: Zahlbrucknerella
- Species: Z. fabispora

Binomial name
- Zahlbrucknerella fabispora Henssen (1977)

Species of lichen

Zahlbrucknerella fabispora is a species of lichen in the family Lichinaceae. It was first discovered in 1977 growing on basaltic rocks in the spray zone of Iceland's Gullfoss waterfall by the German lichenologist Aino Henssen. The species is distinguished by its tiny black rosettes and distinctive bean-shaped spores, which are unique amongst members of its genus. It inhabits cool, damp environments where water seeps or sprays over volcanic rocks, and has since been found scattered across the Northern Hemisphere from Alaska to Russia.

== Taxonomy ==
Zahlbrucknerella fabispora was described in 1977 by the German lichenologist Aino Henssen, who based the species on a tiny, blackish lichen collected on basaltic boulders in the spray zone of Gullfoss waterfall, Iceland; that specimen is the holotype and duplicates are held in the Icelandic National Herbarium (ICEL) and the Botanische Staatssammlung München (MB). Henssen placed the species in the family Lichinaceae and, within Zahlbrucknerella, assigned it to the calcarea group, which are species that retain a brown-pigmented fruit-body disc and a persistent "basal strand" (a cord of fungal threads running along the underside of each filament).

The combination of a minute thallus, very slender filaments, and asci that contain only eight (occasionally sixteen) bean-shaped spores makes Z. fabispora unique in the genus; other members either have many more spores per ascus or lack the distinctive spore shape.

== Description ==
The thallus (lichen body) forms glossy black rosettes measuring 2–5 mm across. Individual filaments are curved, about 1 mm long, and 10–60 μm thick at the tips, widening to 25–80 μm near the base. A two- to three-cell-wide basal strand persists along the lower surface, and the fungal threads (hyphae) branch at right angles or weave into an irregular network of short cells.

Reproductive organs are produced laterally on the filaments. Apothecia—the open, disc-shaped fruiting bodies where sexual spores are made—are up to 0.3 mm wide, with a rough thallus rim and a brown disc. The spore-forming layer (hymenium) is about 60 μm tall; asci are club-shaped, 48–52 × 13–18 μm, and usually carry eight colorless spores. These spores start out ellipsoid but mature into a broad "bean" shape that often shows a narrow waist of cytoplasm known as a plasma bridge, measuring 10–13 × 3.5–7 μm. In Alaskan material the thallus was sterile, so the characteristic bean-shaped ascospores were not observed in that collection.

Minute flask-shaped pycnidia are about 0.1 mm across and release rod-shaped conidia only 1.5–2 × 0.5–1 μm. The photosynthetic partner is the cyanobacterium Scytonema, whose blue-green threads run inside the gelatinous filaments; toward the base, these threads twist and individual cells swell, giving the lichen its slightly gelatinous texture.

== Habitat and distribution ==
Zahlbrucknerella fabispora grows on temporarily moist volcanic rocks, including seepage faces, riverbanks, and waterfall spray zones. In Karelia (north-western Russia) it was found together with moisture-loving cyanobacterial lichens such as Spilonema paradoxum and Ephebe perspinulosa.

Known sites are scattered across the Northern Hemisphere: Iceland (type locality), high-elevation basalts in the Rocky Mountains of Colorado, and basalt outcrops in Karelia. Based on this pattern, Henssen suggested that the species could prove to be a circumpolar boreal or even arctic element once more sites are surveyed. All records come from cool, damp microhabitats where water trickles over rock surfaces, implying that the lichen is sensitive to prolonged drying and relies on stable seepage or spray.

An additional North American record comes from Katmai National Park and Preserve (the first recorded for Alaska), where it was found on lakeshore rock along the Naknek Lake shoreline on the peninsula north-east of Brooks Camp. The collection was sterile, but the identification was based on the minute, dwarf-fruticose habit with a Scytonema-type photobiont and conspicuous collar-like hyphae around the cyanobacterial threads.
