= Coccocarpia elegans =

Scientific classification
- Domain: Eukaryota
- Kingdom: Fungi
- Division: Ascomycota
- Class: Lecanoromycetes
- Order: Peltigerales
- Family: Coccocarpiaceae
- Genus: Coccocarpia
- Species: C. elegans

Binomial name
- Coccocarpia elegans Müll. Arg., 1881

Species of lichen

Coccocarpia elegans is a species of lichenized fungi in the family Coccocarpiaceae. A specimen kept at Geneva city herbarium was collected in 1881 in Apiahy, Brazil.
