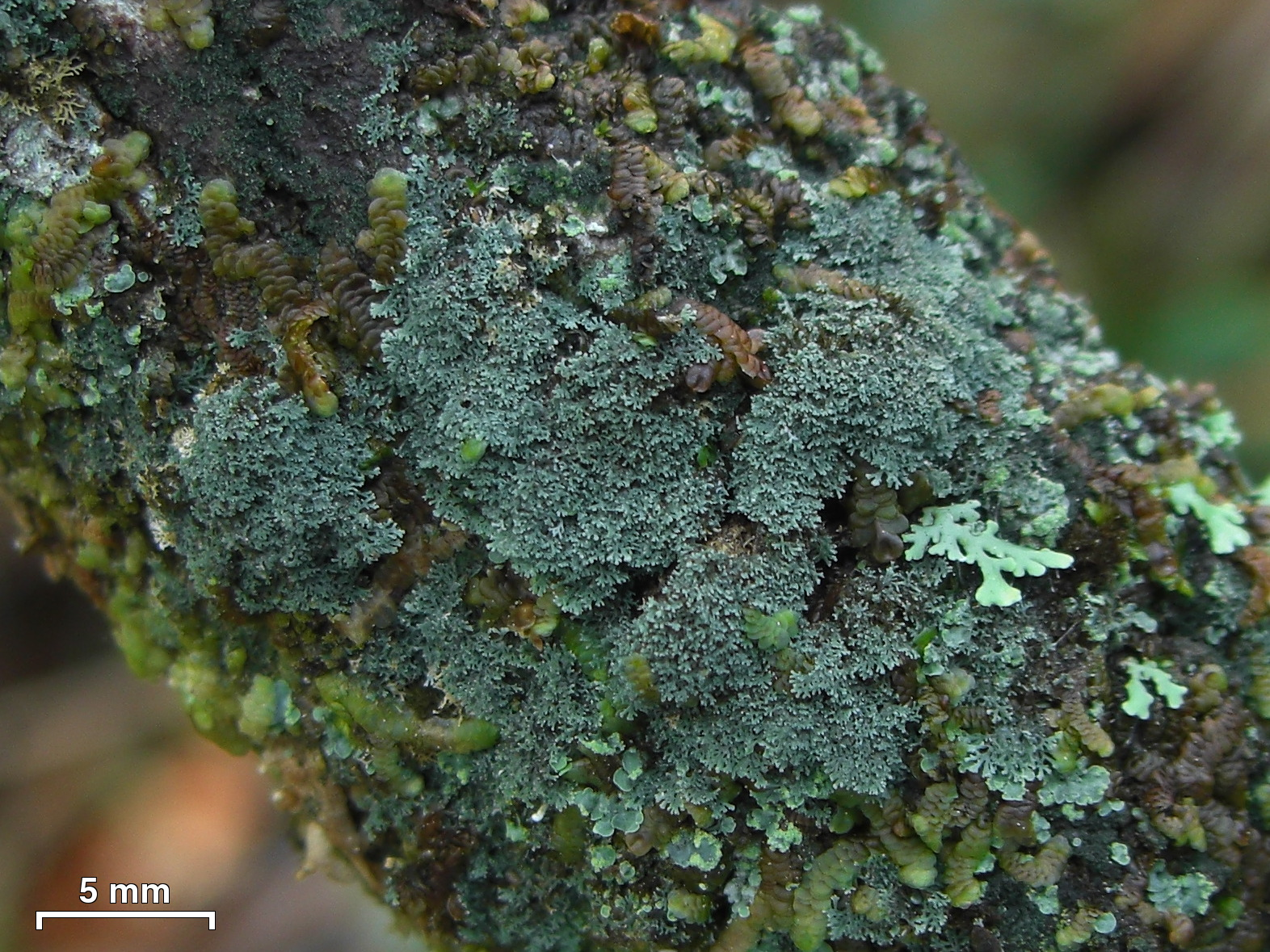

Scientific classification
- Kingdom: Fungi
- Division: Ascomycota
- Class: Lecanoromycetes
- Order: Peltigerales
- Family: Coccocarpiaceae
- Genus: Coccocarpia
- Species: C. prostrata

Binomial name
- Coccocarpia prostrata Lücking, Aptroot & Sipman (2007)

= Coccocarpia prostrata =

Species of lichen-forming fungus

Coccocarpia prostrata is a species of lichen-forming fungus in the family Coccocarpiaceae. It was described in 2007 from material collected in Costa Rica. The lichen forms small, intricately branched, leaf-like patches on bark in humid forests, chiefly at submontane and montane elevations. It is widely distributed in the Neotropics, from the Caribbean and Central America to Bolivia and Brazil, and also occurs in Florida.

== Taxonomy ==
Coccocarpia prostrata was described as a new species in 2007 by Robert Lücking, André Aptroot and Harrie Sipman, one of four new Coccocarpia taxa recognized during a revision of the genus for the Costa Rican TICOLICHEN biodiversity inventory. The authors placed it among the narrow-lobed relatives of C. stellata, but distinguished it by its irregularly elongated, ascending, repeatedly branched secondary lobes. They also noted that at least one specimen had previously been included within the concept of C. domingensis, but regarded that identification as mistaken because C. domingensis has a flatter, stellate thallus with true isidia rather than ascending secondary lobes. A later Florida treatment suggested that North American specimens identified as C. domingensis should be re-evaluated, because some may represent C. prostrata instead.

== Description ==
The thallus begins as a roughly circular, leaf-like patch on bark and later expands into irregular colonies up to 5 cm (2 in) across. Its primary lobes are narrow, flat, and repeatedly branched, usually 0.2–0.4 mm wide, with gaps between them; the tips are often forked and somewhat ascending. A second set of even narrower lobes rises from the first and branches freely, giving the lichen a layered, almost shrubby appearance. When wet, the upper surface is blue-green, but when dry it becomes brownish, greenish, or lead-gray and is usually marked by fine white longitudinal lines. The underside is pale and bears numerous white rhizines that project beyond the margins. Small rounded lobules may sometimes develop within the thallus, and apothecia are uncommon, usually central, orange-brown structures up to 3 mm across that become convex with age. The ascospores are more or less spherical and about 4–5 μm in diameter. No lichen substances were detected by thin-layer chromatography.

== Habitat and distribution ==
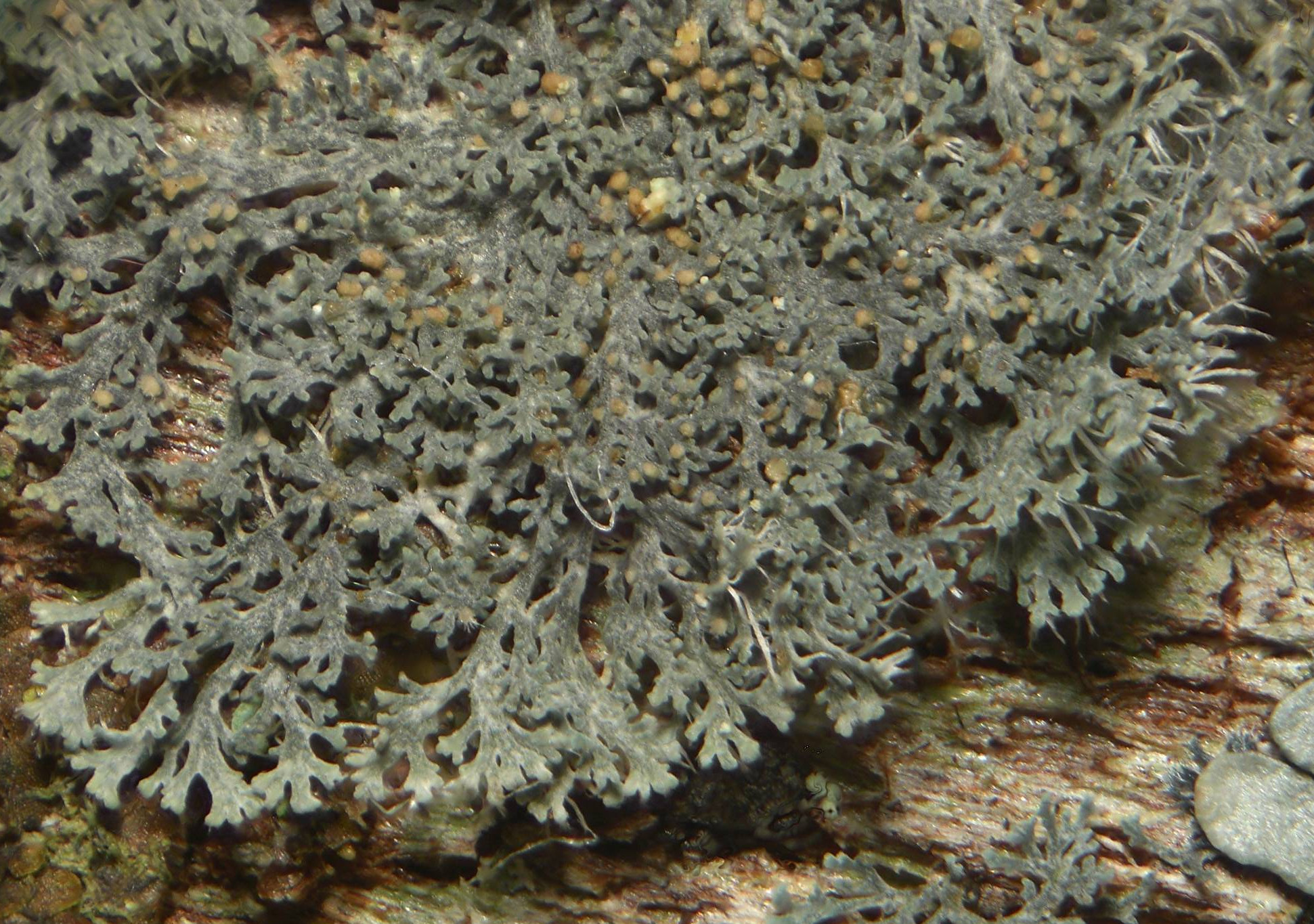
Growing on bark in Ocala National Forest, Florida

Coccocarpia prostrata is chiefly a species of humid to very wet forests, growing on bark and occasionally on rock, often among mats of mosses and liverworts. It has also been reported growing lichenicolously on Parmotrema. Although most strongly associated with submontane and montane elevations, the ecological analysis in the original species description showed a broader range, from lowland and foothill sites up to upper montane and subparamo habitats.

The species is widely distributed in the Neotropics and extends into the southeastern United States. Outside Costa Rica, the describing authors cited specimens from the Dominican Republic, Colombia, Venezuela, French Guiana, Brazil, Bolivia, and Florida. In Colombia it has been reported from the departments of Caldas, Chocó, and Risaralda at 168–1,700 m elevation, chiefly in humid, exposed, and often disturbed habitats around 1,000 m, where it grows on bark including that of Mangifera indica. A Bolivian survey of the order Peltigerales recorded it from the departments of Cochabamba, La Paz, and Santa Cruz at about 1,120–2,800 m, on both bark and rock in Yungas montane forests. It has also been recorded from Santa Cruz Island in the Galápagos and, in the United States, from the Ocala National Forest in Florida, including the Mormon Branch Research Natural Area in Lake County, north of Orlando.
