= Spilonema maritimum =

Scientific classification
- Kingdom: Fungi
- Division: Ascomycota
- Class: Lecanoromycetes
- Order: Peltigerales
- Family: Coccocarpiaceae
- Genus: Spilonema
- Species: S. maritimum

Binomial name
- Spilonema maritimum T.Sprib. & Fryday (2020)

Species of lichen

Spilonema maritimum is a species of lichen in the family Coccocarpiaceae. Found in Alaska, it was described as a new species in 2020 by lichenologists Toby Spribille and Alan Fryday. The type specimen was collected in Juneau Borough, on the west side of Douglas Island. Here it was found growing on exposed seashore rocks roughly 2 m (6.6 ft) above the high tide line. Its specific epithet maritimum alludes to its close association with maritime rocks.

== Description ==
The thallus of Spilonema maritimum is made of radiating filaments that form olivaceous-brown rosettes measuring 0.5–1.5 cm (0.2–0.6 in) in diameter. Its asci are eight-spored, with dimensions of 30–42 by 10–13 μm. The ascospores are ellipsoid, measuring 7.8–8.9 by 3.6–3.9 μm. The results of standard chemical spot tests are all negative, and thin-layer chromatography confirms the absence of secondary metabolites.

In addition to various locations in Alaska, the lichen has also been recorded from Haida Gwaii and Vancouver Island, British Columbia.
