= Zahlbrucknerella patagonica =

Scientific classification
- Kingdom: Fungi
- Division: Ascomycota
- Class: Lichinomycetes
- Order: Lichinales
- Family: Lichinaceae
- Genus: Zahlbrucknerella
- Species: Z. patagonica

Binomial name
- Zahlbrucknerella patagonica Henssen (1977)

Species of lichen

Zahlbrucknerella patagonica is a species of lichen in the family Lichinaceae. Described in 1977 from specimens collected near Argentino Lake in southern Argentina, this species forms dark brown to black tufts of branching filaments on persistently wet rock surfaces. The lichen is found primarily in Patagonia's lake district, where it grows in drainage channels, seepage zones, and lakeshores alongside other moisture-loving lichens.

== Taxonomy ==
Zahlbrucknerella patagonica was described in 1977 by the German lichenologist Aino Henssen. She placed it in the maritima group of Zahlbrucknerella, a set of species distinguished by a reticulate (net-like) hyphal arrangement and by dark-green spore-bearing openings rather than brown ones. The holotype specimen was collected on drainage-channel schist at El Calafate on the shore of Lago Argentino, Santa Cruz Province, southern Argentina. The holotype is housed in the herbarium of the Natural History Museum, Vienna.

Within the genus, Z. patagonica is most readily separated from its maritime look-alike Z. maritima by the uniformly brown thallus (body) lacking any olive sheen and by a pseudoparenchymatous tissue of evenly sized cells; it also differs from the much larger Z. maxima in having thinner filaments and a smaller overall thallus.

== Description ==
The lichen forms shiny dark-brown to black tufts that can coalesce into mats up to about 8 mm across. Individual filaments reach 3–5 mm in length; their paired branches separate at the tips, which measure 10–15 micrometers (μm) across, while the basal portions can swell to 150 μm. A distinct basal strand of tightly packed hyphae occurs only near filament tips; elsewhere the hyphae fan out into an irregular net, and in older parts they enlarge and pack together to create a brick-like pseudoparenchyma whose cell cavities reach 10 μm.

Fertile material is common. Lateral apothecia (open, cup-shaped fruiting bodies) are up to 0.4 mm wide with a slightly rough, lichenized rim and a dark-green disc. The spore-producing layer (hymenium) is 100–140 μm tall and rests over a bowl- or cone-shaped hypothecium; an excipulum (outer wall) is reduced to a thin vestige. Asci are cylindrical to club-shaped (85–105 × 16–22 μm) and consistently hold 24 colorless, simple spores that are ellipsoid to spherical (globose, 7–11 × 5–7 μm. Minute flask-shaped pycnidia punctuate the filaments; they are ≤0.15 mm wide with dark-green ostioles and release rod-shaped conidia 2.5–4 × 1–1.5 μm. Field material can be interwoven with the superficially similar cyanobacterial lichen Placynthium arachnoideum; mixed tufts of the two are difficult to separate in the field. In the Southern Hemisphere, Zahlbrucknerella filaments lack the dark-green lower-surface pigmentation seen in Placynthium, a small but useful difference when checking problem specimens.

== Habitat and distribution ==
Zahlbrucknerella patagonica grows on persistently damp rock faces such as drainage channels, seepage zones, and lakeshores. It grows on a range of substrates including schist, granite, and silicate boulders. It often shares the microhabitat with other moisture-loving cyanobacterial lichens, such as Spilonema paradoxum, and with crusts of Placynthium and Staurothele.

The species is common in southern Argentina's Patagonian lake district and has also been recorded once from the Antarctic Peninsula region, indicating a preference for cool, humid, subantarctic climates. Field collections span sites from Calafate and Lake Frío in Santa Cruz Province northward to Lolog Lake in Neuquén, always on rock surfaces kept wet by spray, seepage, or fluctuating lake levels. At Calafate (Cuevas de Hualichu) on the shore of Argentino Lake, the species occurs in drainage lines on inclined rock faces together with Placynthium asperellum, matching its preference for persistently wet, spray-influenced surfaces. The lichen has also been recorded from a single location in Kenya.
