= Cora arborescens =

Scientific classification
- Kingdom: Fungi
- Division: Basidiomycota
- Class: Agaricomycetes
- Order: Agaricales
- Family: Hygrophoraceae
- Genus: Cora
- Species: C. arborescens

Binomial name
- Cora arborescens Dal-Forno, Chaves & Lücking (2016)

Species of lichen

Cora arborescens is a little-known species of basidiolichen in the family Hygrophoraceae. It was formally described as a new species in 2016 by Manuela Dal Forno, José Luis Chaves, and Robert Lücking. The specific epithet arborescens refers to its growth on trees. The lichen is only known from the type locality near Cerro de la Muerte in Costa Rica.

== Taxonomy ==
Cora arborescens is a basidiolichen in the family Hygrophoraceae (order Agaricales). It was described in 2016 by Manuela Dal Forno, José Luis Chaves, and Robert Lücking from material collected in a high-elevation cloud forest near Cerro de la Muerte, Costa Rica. The epithet, arborescens, refers to the lichen's epiphytic habit on tree branches and twigs. Although superficially similar to species such as C. canari, C. smaragdina, C. udebeceana, C. viliewoa, and C. boleslia, molecular analyses show that these taxa are not closely related.

== Description ==
The thallus of Cora arborescens is epiphytic and foliose, forming rosettes up to 5 cm across. It comprises two to five semicircular, somewhat overlapping (imbricate) lobes, each 1.5–4 cm wide and 2–2.5 cm long with short radial sutures. When fresh the upper surface is emerald green, even, and glabrous, showing faint concentric colour zoning; margins are thin, rolled in (involute), and also glabrous. Dried material turns uniformly light grey. The lower surface lacks a cortex (it is ecorticate) and presents a light-grey, felty-arachnoid medulla.

In section the thallus is 240–330 micrometres (μm) thick. The upper cortex is viaduct-shaped: a 20–25 μm layer of densely packed periclinal hyphae overlies a 40–100 μm zone of anticlinal hyphae. The photobiont layer is 80–155 μm thick and aeruginous green, while the medulla is 45–90 μm thick and contains numerous papilliform hyphae 3–6 μm wide; clamp connections are absent. The hymenophore forms diffuse, concentric, resupinate patches up to 0.5 mm long and 5 mm broad with a pale yellow-orange, smooth surface and slightly felty, involute margins. Sections (80–115 μm thick) reveal plentiful palisade-like basidioles (15–25 × 4–6 μm) and scattered four-spored basidia (20–30 × 4–6 μm); basidiospores have not been observed. Thin-layer chromatography detected no secondary metabolites.

== Habitat and distribution ==
As of its original publication, the species was known to occur only in its type locality in Tapantí National Park, Cartago Province, Costa Rica, at 3,300–3,400 m elevation. It grows epiphytically on tree branches and twigs in sub-Andean cloud forest conditions characterised by high humidity, frequent mists, and rapid wet-dry cycles. Cora arborescens is among the 18 Cora species found in Costa Rica and is one of 12 species in the genus for which Costa Rica is the type locality.
