= Coccocarpia melloniorum =

Scientific classification
- Domain: Eukaryota
- Kingdom: Fungi
- Division: Ascomycota
- Class: Lecanoromycetes
- Order: Peltigerales
- Family: Coccocarpiaceae
- Genus: Coccocarpia
- Species: C. melloniorum

Binomial name
- Coccocarpia melloniorum Lücking (2011)

Species of lichen

Coccocarpia melloniorum is a rare species of foliicolous (leaf-dwelling) lichen in the family Coccocarpiaceae. Found in the Philippines, the lichen is characterised by its microfoliose thallus and squamiform (scale-shaped) isidia.

== Taxonomy ==
Coccocarpia melloniorum was formally described by lichenologist Robert Lücking in 2011. The type specimen was originally collected in Tayabas, Luzon, on Mount Binuang in 1917. The type, thought to have been lost at the herbarium that housed it, was later found and determined to be a new species. The species name melloniorum honours the contributions of the Andrew W. Mellon Foundation for their support to museums, art conservation, and the Global Plants Initiative project, "an international partnership of herbaria working to create a coordinated database of information and images of plant type specimens worldwide ... including fungi and lichens".

== Description ==
The thallus of Coccocarpia melloniorum is epiphyllous (growing on leaves) and microfoliose, with a rounded to irregular outline and diameter ranging from 5–15 mm. Its lobes are thin, flat, linear to flabellate, and 0.3–0.6 mm wide, widening to 0.5–1.0 mm at the tips. The upper surface of the lobes is blue-grey but may show brown discolouration in some specimens, with indistinct pale grooves visible under high magnification, particularly at the tips of the lobe. The lower surface is pale to dark brown, with numerous black, branched rhizines measuring 0.3–0.5 mm long.

Coccocarpia melloniorum is distinguished from similar species by its numerous squamiform isidia, which are mostly laminal, rounded, and sometimes irregular or elongate. These isidia are 0.05–0.20 mm in diameter and up to 0.3–0.5 mm long when elongated. No apothecia have been observed, and no substances were detected by thin-layer chromatography.

=== Similar species ===
Coccocarpia melloniorum shares similarities with the neotropical Coccocarpia neglecta, but the former has wider thallus lobes and squamiform isidia. Coccocarpia melloniorum also resembles Coccocarpia dissecta, which has isidiate lobes and black rhizines. However, C. dissecta has cylindrical isidia and a more robust appearance with closely adjacent lobes. The lobe morphology of C. melloniorum is intermediate between that of C. neglecta and C. epiphylla, with the latter lacking isidia and having broader, contiguous thallus lobes and a pale underside with pale rhizines.

== Habitat and distribution ==
Coccocarpia melloniorum is found in the Philippines, specifically in Tayabas, Luzon, on Mt. Binuang. It grows on the leaves of unidentified dicotyledon plants.
