= Cora canari =

Scientific classification
- Kingdom: Fungi
- Division: Basidiomycota
- Class: Agaricomycetes
- Order: Agaricales
- Family: Hygrophoraceae
- Genus: Cora
- Species: C. canari

Binomial name
- Cora canari Nugra, Dal-Forno & Lücking (2016)

Species of lichen

Cora canari is a rare species of basidiolichen in the family Hygrophoraceae. It was formally described as a new species in 2016 by Freddy Nugra, Manuela Dal Forno, and Robert Lücking. The specific epithet canari refers to the Cañari people of pre-Incan Ecuador. The lichen is only known to occur at the type locality in the Morona-Santiago Province of Ecuador, where it grows as an epiphyte on tree trunks and branches. It forms small rosettes up to 5 cm across with emerald-green to blue-green lobes that have wavy surfaces and thin, rolled-in grey margins.

== Taxonomy ==
Cora canari is a basidiolichen in the family Hygrophoraceae (order Agaricales). It was described in 2016 by Lizeth Nugra, Manuela Dal Forno, and Robert Lücking from material collected in the lower montane rain-forest of Morona-Santiago Province, Ecuador. The epithet commemorates the Cañari—one of Ecuador's pre-Incan indigenous nations. ITS sequences place C. canari in a clade that also includes the Colombian species C. setosa and C. undulata and two Galápagos endemics, rather than the superficially similar terrestrial taxa C. hafecesweorthensis and C. imi.

== Description ==
The thallus of Cora canari is epiphytic and foliose, forming rosettes up to 5 cm across on bark. It comprises three to five semicircular lobes, 1–2 cm wide and 0.7–1.5 cm long, that are unbranched or only sparsely branched and lack radial sutures. Fresh lobes are aeruginous- to emerald-green, becoming green-grey in the herbarium; the thin, rolled-in (involute) margins are grey and glabrous. The upper surface is undulate (wavy) when moist and undulate-rugose (wavy and wrinkled) on drying, with no concentric colour bands. The lower face does not have a cortex (it isecorticate) and exposes a white-grey, felty-arachnoid medulla.

In section the thallus is 200–250 micrometres (μm) thick. A diffusely viaduct-shaped upper cortex, 20–30 μm deep, overlies a 30–70 μm band of anticlinal hyphae. The photobiont layer is 40–70 μm thick and aeruginous throughout; the medulla is 40–70 μm, hydrophobic, and lacks clamp connections or papilliform hyphae. No hymenophore has been observed, and thin-layer chromatography has detected no secondary metabolites.

== Habitat and distribution ==
Cora canari is known only from its type locality at 1,581 m elevation near the Sopladora Hydroelectric Project, Morona-Santiago Province, Ecuador. It inhabits moist lower montane rain-forest, growing epiphytically on trunks and branches among bryophyte mats and other lichens, including Coccocarpia species. The lichen's undulate, hydrophobic lobes may facilitate rapid drainage and gas exchange in the consistently humid conditions of this Andean cloud forest.
