= Peltularia =

Scientific classification
- Kingdom: Fungi
- Division: Ascomycota
- Class: Lecanoromycetes
- Order: Peltigerales
- Family: Coccocarpiaceae
- Genus: Peltularia; R.Sant. (1944)

Type species
- Peltularia gyrophoroides (Räsänen) R.Sant. (1944)

Species
- P. austroshetlandica P. crassa P. fuegiana P. gyrophoroides

Genus of lichen-forming fungi

Peltularia is a genus of lichen-forming fungi in the family Coccocarpiaceae. The genus was circumscribed by the Swedish lichenologist Rolf Santesson in 1944, with Peltularia gyrophoroides from Patagonia as the type species. Its four known species are found in southern South America and on subantarctic islands, where they grow on rock in exposed, wind-swept habitats. The photosynthetic partner is a cyanobacterium, and the thallus is leafy and attached to the rock by disc-like holdfasts.

== Taxonomy ==
The genus was circumscribed by the Swedish lichenologist Rolf Santesson in 1944, with Peltularia gyrophoroides designated as the type and only species. The type was collected from Patagonia (southern South America). In 1984, Per Magnus Jørgensen and David James Galloway described Peltularia crassa from subantarctic Campbell Island and reported it also from Macquarie Island, after studying material that was mostly sterile and difficult to place on thallus characteristics alone. They noted that the species had previously been mentioned only briefly (as Erioderma in a key to the lichen genera of Macquarie Island), but young apothecia in the type material showed that it belonged in Peltularia. Comparing P. crassa with P. gyrophoroides, they concluded that the two share similar apothecial structure and development, supporting their placement in the same genus. Peltularia fuegiana and Peltularia austroshetlandica were added to the genus in 2001 and 2005, respectively.

== Description ==
In Peltularia crassa, the thallus is foliose (leafy) and appears umbilicate, being attached to rock by several disc-like holdfasts. From the holdfasts a white, fibrous, crust-like rim can spread out across the rock surface. The lobes are up to about 1.5 cm broad, with slightly incised or scalloped margins. The upper surface is roughened and may become cracked into small patches. Powdery reproductive patches (soralia) occur both on the lobe surface and along the margins and produce bluish, coarse soredia. The underside is pale pinkish-white, warted and pitted, sometimes perforated, and may also develop soralia.

The photosynthetic partner (photobiont) in P. crassa is a cyanobacterium in the genus Nostoc. Apothecia are very rare in Peltularia. When present they are small (to about 1 mm across), erupt through the upper cortex, and develop a thalline margin with a flat, brown disc. Jørgensen and Galloway reported no lichen substances in P. crassa using thin-layer chromatography. In their comparison with the Patagonian type species P. gyrophoroides, they noted that P. gyrophoroides is smaller (to about 1 cm across) and lacks soralia; its underside is yellow-brown and thinly hairy, its photobiont was reported as Scytonema, and its spores are simple rather than septate.

== Habitat and distribution ==
Peltularia crassa is known from high-elevation sites on Campbell Island and Macquarie Island in the subantarctic (about 170–365 m elevation). It grows on stones in fellfield scree and on exposed rocky outcrops in tussock grassland. Jørgensen and Galloway suggested that the species had probably been overlooked because it is restricted to mountain summits and alpine outcrops on islands that are rarely visited by botanists. Peltularia fuegiana is found in Tierra del Fuego and the South Shetland Islands.

The habitats where P. crassa occurs are strongly oceanic, with frequent strong westerly winds, high humidity and frequent cloud. Precipitation is often light rain or drizzle, with many rain days each year. On Campbell Island it was reported growing with several other lichens: Cladia aggregata, Hypogymnia lugubris, Placopsis subgelida, Pseudocyphellaria delisea and Steinera sorediata (recorded there as its first record outside mainland New Zealand). P. gyrophoroides was described as being known only from its type collection in Patagonia. The authors considered the discovery of P. crassa biogeographically important because it extended Peltularia beyond South America, and they suggested that the genus may represent an old austral lineage known from very few collections.

== Species ==
Species Fungorum (in the Catalogue of Life) accept four species of Peltularia:

- Peltularia austroshetlandica (Øvstedal & Søchting) P.M.Jørg. (2005)
- Peltularia crassa P.M.Jørg. & D.J.Galloway (1984)
- Peltularia fuegiana Henssen & P.M.Jørg. (2001)
- Peltularia gyrophoroides (Räsänen) R.Sant. (1944)
