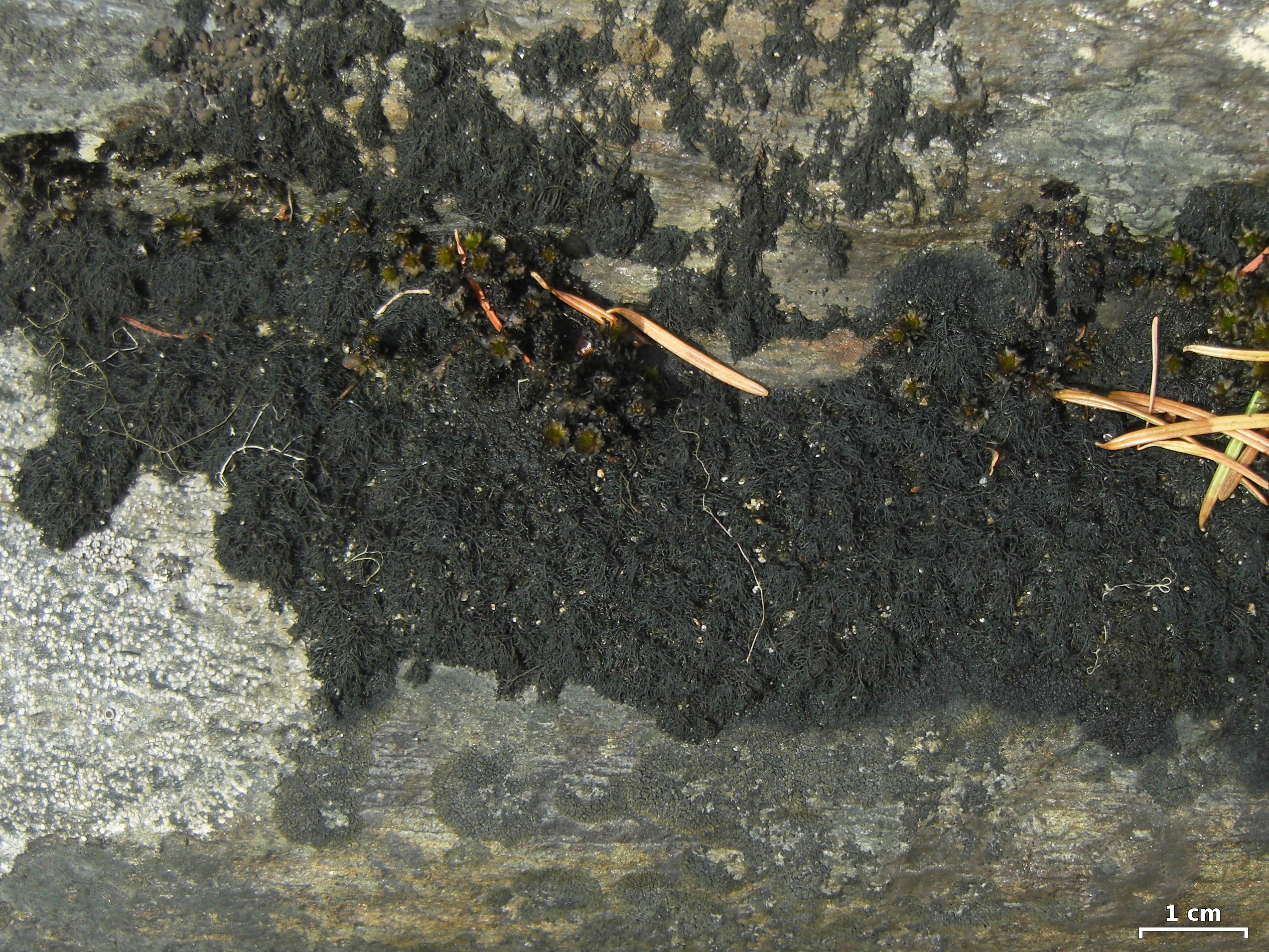

Conservation status
- Secure (NatureServe)

Scientific classification
- Kingdom: Fungi
- Division: Ascomycota
- Class: Lichinomycetes
- Order: Lichinales
- Family: Porocyphaceae
- Genus: Ephebe
- Species: E. lanata

Binomial name
- Ephebe lanata (L.) Vain. (1888)

Synonyms
- Lichen lanatus L. (1753)

= Ephebe lanata =

Species of lichen-forming fungus

Ephebe lanata is a species of filamentous lichen in the family Lichinaceae, and the type species of the genus Ephebe. The lichen was first described as a new species by Swedish taxonomist Carl Linnaeus in his seminal 1753 work Species Plantarum, as Lichen lanatus. Finnish lichenologist Edvard August Vainio transferred it to Ephebe in 1888. In North America, it is known colloquially as the "rockshag lichen".

== See also ==
- List of lichens named by Carl Linnaeus
