= Hirn =

Hirn is a German language habitational surname. Notable people with the name include:

- Akseli Hirn (1845–1906), Finnish minister
- Gustave-Adolphe Hirn (1815–1890), French physicist, astronomer. mathematician and engineer
- Karl Engelbrecht Hirn (1872–1907), Finnish botanist, specialized in freshwater algae
