= Kufferath =

Kufferath is a surname. Notable people with the surname include:

- Johann Hermann Kufferath (1797–1864), German composer
- Maurice Kufferath (1852–1919), Belgian music critic, librettist, cellist, and conductor
