= Jean-Baptiste Édouard Bornet =

French botanist (1828–1911)

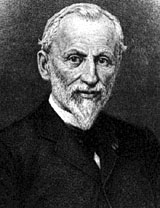
Jean-Baptiste Édouard Bornet

Jean-Baptiste Édouard Bornet (September 2, 1828, Guérigny – December 18, 1911, Paris) was a French botanist.

The standard author abbreviation Bornet is used to indicate this person as the author when citing a botanical name.

== Life ==
Bornet studied medicine in Paris, and in 1886 became a member of the French Académie des sciences. With Gustave Thuret, he was co-author of Notes algologiques (1876–1880) and the Études phycologiques (1878), both works being published after Thuret's death in 1875. He helped establish the nature of lichens and was the first to find the reproductive process of red algae. In the field of lichenology, he wrote Recherches sur les gonidies des lichens (1873). With Charles Flahault, he published on Nostocaceae: Revision des Nostocacées héterocystées (1886–88). For the exsiccata Algues des Seychelles (Ocean Indien) determinées par Dr. Ed. Bornet he identified algae specimens collected by W. Steicher from the Seychelles in 1889.

== Awards and honours ==
In 1877, botanist Munier-Chalmas published Bornetella is a genus of green algae in the family Dasycladaceae and named in Jean-Baptiste Édouard Bornet's honor.

Bornet was elected a member of the Royal Swedish Academy of Sciences in 1888.

He was awarded the Linnean Medal in 1891.

Bornet was elected an International Honorary Member of the American Academy of Arts and Sciences in 1893.

Bornet was elected an International Member of the United States National Academy of Sciences in 1901.

He was admitted as a Foreign Member to the United Kingdom's Royal Society in 1910.

Bornet was elected an International Member of the American Philosophical Society in 1911.

== See also ==
- Category:Taxa named by Jean-Baptiste Édouard Bornet
