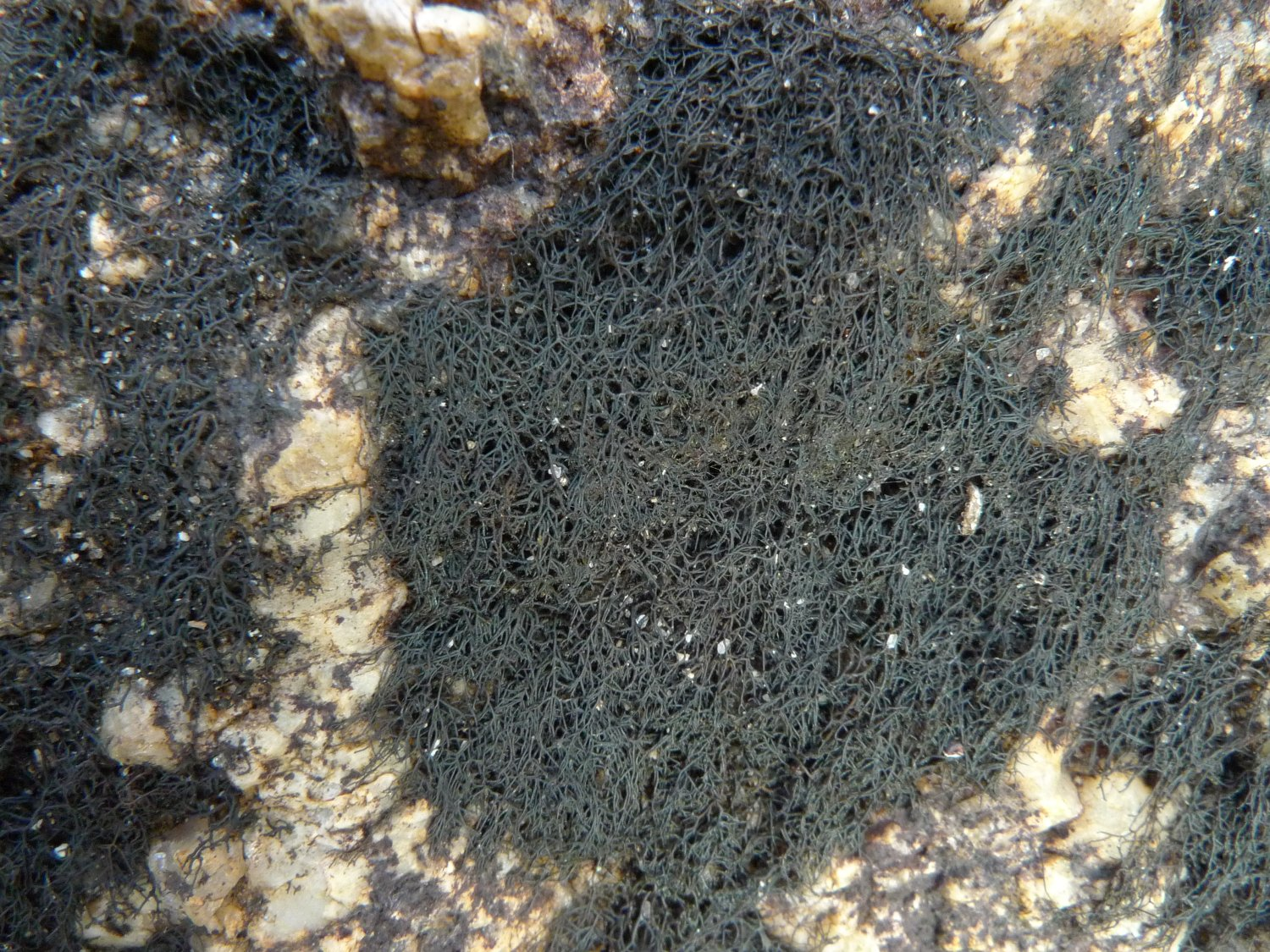
- Ephebe lanata

Scientific classification
- Kingdom: Fungi
- Division: Ascomycota
- Class: Lichinomycetes
- Order: Lichinales
- Family: Porocyphaceae
- Genus: Ephebe; Fr. (1825)

Type species
- Ephebe lanata (L.) Vain. (1888)

Species
- see text

Synonyms
- Ephebeia Nyl. (1875); Spilonematopsis E.Dahl (1950); Ephebomyces Cif. & Tomas. (1953)

= Ephebe (lichen) =

Genus of lichen

Ephebe is a genus of lichen-forming fungi in the family Porocyphaceae. These lichens form dark, hair-like mats that spread across rocks and tree bark, resembling tangled black wool. Unlike many other lichens, Ephebe species partner with blue-green algae that can capture nitrogen from the air. The genus contains thirteen recognized species found in various parts of the world, from temperate regions to more tropical areas.

== Taxonomy ==
Ephebe was circumscribed by Elias Magnus Fries in 1825. In his original description, Fries characterized the genus as having a filamentous thallus with cylindrical, thread-like branches bearing small punctate structures arranged in rings on swollen nodules. At the time of publication, Fries had not yet observed the reproductive structures (apothecia) but predicted they would be scattered and superficial with a thalline disc. He noted the genus's relationship to other filamentous lichens and referenced its connection to Cenogonium within the Byssaceae, a family name now considered invalid. Although Fries did not indicate a type species for the genus, Frederic Clements and Cornelius Lott Shear later designated Ephebe lanata as the type.

In a multilocus phylogeny and reclassification of the class Lichinomycetes, María Prieto, Mats Wedin and Matthias Schultz (2024) transferred Ephebe to the family Porocyphaceae (it was previously in the Lichinaceae), along with several other genera formerly treated in Lichinaceae and Ephebaceae.

== Description ==
Ephebe species form dark brown-to-black mats of fine, hair-like filaments that creep across rock and bark surfaces like a tangled carpet. Each tuft is attached at a single point by a small holdfast, then branches repeatedly to create an intricate web. Because the filaments lack a true outer skin (cortex), the fungal threads, or hyphae, lie directly on the surface; when young they surround the partner alga but later organise into a loose central strand. The algal associate is from the cyanobacterial genus Stigonema, which grows as bead-like chains of cells and gives the lichen its ability to fix atmospheric nitrogen.

Reproductive bodies begin as tiny flask-shaped structures called pycnidia and mature into disc-shaped apothecia that sit flush with the filament surface. The discs are minute pin-pricks, ringed by a true fungal rim but not by thallus tissue. Inside, the spore layer is jelly-like; its upper portion turns brown and reacts iodine-positive (blue-green) in chemical tests, a useful identification clue. Slender supporting threads (paraphyses) line the cavity, their tips slightly swollen. Each spore sac (ascus) is cylindrical to club-shaped, has a thin wall that stains blue in iodine, and typically contains eight—but sometimes up to sixteen—colourless ascospores. The spores lack cross-walls, though a few may show one or two "plasma bridges", internal strands that do not reach the wall. Asexual spores (conidia) are produced in the remaining pycnidia; they are simple, rod-to-oval bodies released from elongated, branched conidiophores. No secondary metabolites have been detected with thin-layer chromatography, and standard spot tests on the thallus are negative.

== Species ==
In a 2024 molecular phylogenetics-led reorganisation of the Lichinomycetes, María Prieto and colleagues included 13 species in the genus. As of September 2025, Species Fungorum accepts 6 species of Ephebe.

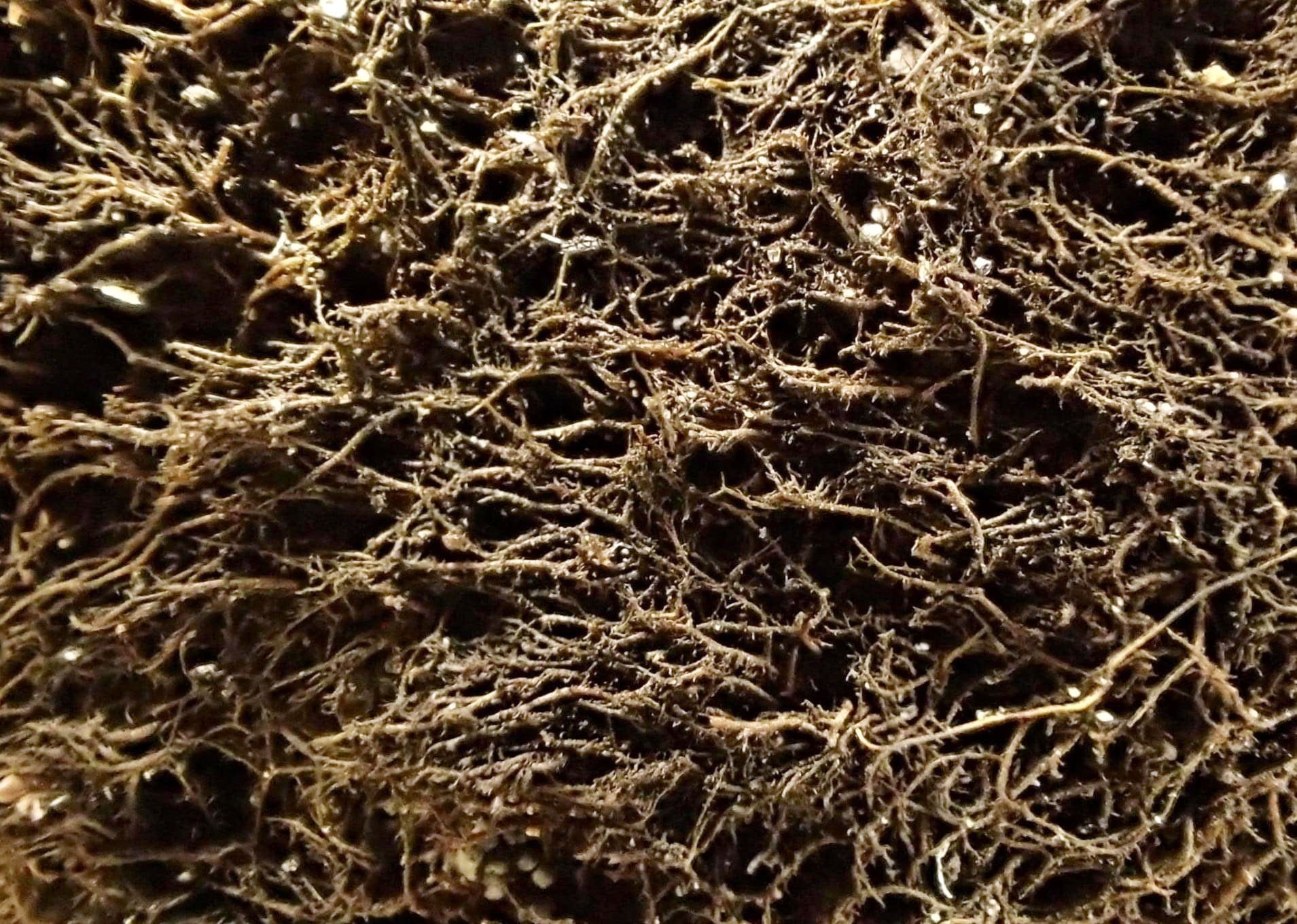
Ephebe hispidula

- Ephebe americana Henssen (1963)
- Ephebe brasiliensis (Vain.) Henssen (1963)
- Ephebe epheboides (F.Wilson) Henssen (1963)
- Ephebe fruticosa Henssen (1963)
- Ephebe hispidula (Ach.) Horw. (1912)
- Ephebe japonica Asahina & Henssen (1963)
- Ephebe lanata (L.) Vain. (1888)
- Ephebe multispora (E.Dahl) Henssen (1963)
- Ephebe ocellata Henssen (1963)
- Ephebe orthogonia Henssen (1963)
- Ephebe perspinulosa Nyl. (1876)
- Ephebe solida Bornet (1852)
- Ephebe tasmanica Cromb. (1879)
- Ephebe trachytera (Nyl.) Henssen (1963)
