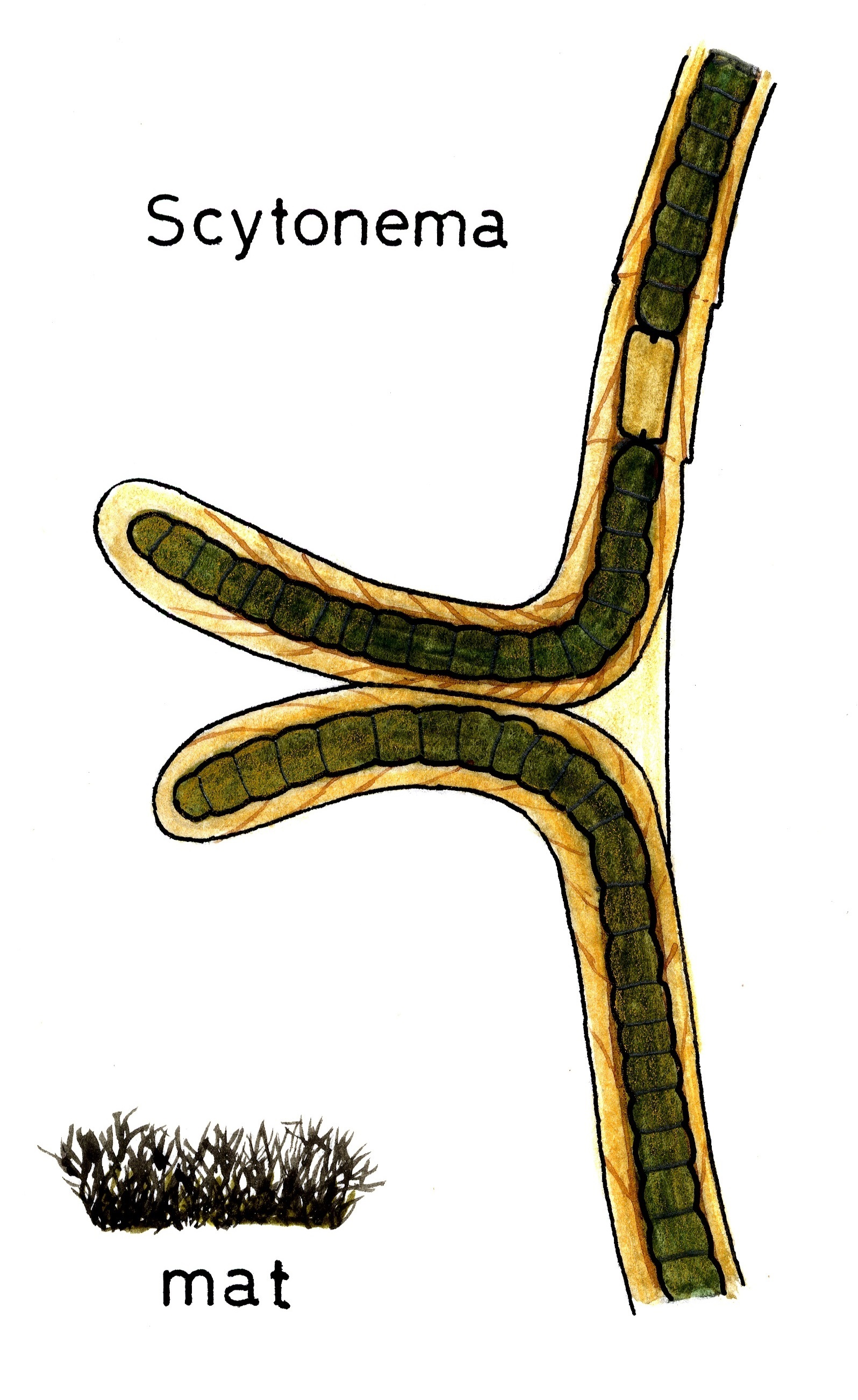
- Scytonema, illustration

Scientific classification
- Domain: Bacteria
- Kingdom: Bacillati
- Phylum: Cyanobacteriota
- Class: Cyanophyceae
- Order: Nostocales
- Family: Scytonemataceae
- Genus: Scytonema; C.Agardh ex É.Bornet & C.Flahault, 1886

Type species
- Scytonema hofmanii C.Agardh ex Bornet & Flahault

Species
- See text.

= Scytonema =

Genus of cyanophyceae

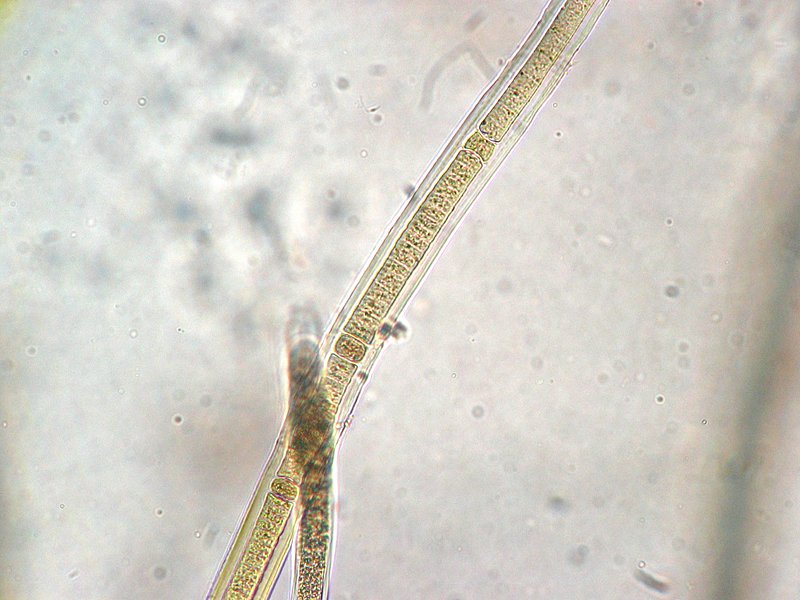
Heterocyst of Scytonema crispum

Scytonema is a genus of photosynthetic cyanobacteria that contains over 100 species. It grows in filaments that form dark mats. Many species are aquatic and are either free-floating or grow attached to a submerged substrate, while others species grow on terrestrial rocks, wood, soil, or plants. Scytonema is a nitrogen fixer, and can provide fixed nitrogen to the leaves of plants on which it is growing. Some species of Scytonema form a symbiotic relationship with fungi to produce a lichen.

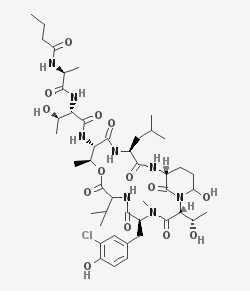
Scyptolin A

Scyptolins are a type of elastase inhibitors isolated from some species of Scytonema.

A study comparing red macroalgae to Scytonema species showed their potential for cosmetical use, both for their antioxidants properties and photoprotection capacities due to their compounds MAAs, and scytonemin (unique to Scytonema). This study indicated that they could be used as photoprotectors absorbing both in the UV-B and UV-A.

== Species ==
Scytonema includes the following subtaxa:

- Scytonema amplum West & G.S.West
- Scytonema andradeana P.González
- Scytonema arcangelii Bornet & Flahault
  - Scytonema arcangelii f. minus Frémy
- Scytonema austinii H.C.Wood
- Scytonema azureum Tilden
- Scytonema badium Wolle
- Scytonema belizensis Komarék et al.
- Scytonema bewsii F.E.Fritsch & F.Rich
- Scytonema bilaspurense Singh
- Scytonema bivaginata H.Welsh
- Scytonema bohneri Schmidle
- Scytonema bruneum Schmidle
- Scytonema burmanicum Skuja
- Scytonema calcicola Kufferath
- Scytonema caldarium Setchell
  - Scytonema caldarium var. terrestre Copeland
- Scytonema calothrichoides Kützing
- Scytonema capitatum N.L.Gardner
- Scytonema carolinianum Philson
- Scytonema catenatum N.L.Gardner
- Scytonema catenulum N.L.Gardner
- Scytonema chengii Wang 1934
  - Scytonema chiastum f. minor Parukutty
- Scytonema chiastum Geitler
  - Scytonema chlorophaeum f. tenuis G.Martens
- Scytonema chorae C.L.Sant'Anna & J.Komárek
- Scytonema cineraceum C.L.Zhou & H.X.Xiao
- Scytonema claviformis Y.Li
- Scytonema coactile Montagne ex Bornet & Flahault
  - Scytonema coactile var. brasilense Nordstedt
  - Scytonema coactile var. minus Wille
  - Scytonema coactile var. thermalis Geitler
- Scytonema conardii Kufferath
- Scytonema conchophilum Humphrey
- Scytonema concinnum Y.M.Lin & H.X.Xiao
- Scytonema consociatum C.-C.Jao
- Scytonema contortum M.Watanabe & Komárek
- Scytonema cookei West
- Scytonema costaricensis Kufferath
  - Scytonema crassum var. indicum S.Silva
- Scytonema crispum Bornet ex De Toni
  - Scytonema crispum subsp. minu L.C.Li
  - Scytonema crispum var. aethiopicum West & G.S.West
  - Scytonema crustaceum var. incrustans Bornet & Flahault
- Scytonema cuatrecasasii P.González
- Scytonema dilatatum Bharadwaja
  - Scytonema dilatatum f. major Bharadwaja
- Scytonema drilosiphon Elenkin & V.I.Polyansky
- Scytonema dubium De Wildeman
- Scytonema echeverriae Kufferath
- Scytonema endolithicum Ercegovic
- Scytonema evanescens N.L.Gardner
- Scytonema fertilia M.Watanabe & Komárek
- Scytonema figuratum C.Agardh ex Bornet & Flahault
- Scytonema flavoviride Bornet & Flahault
- Scytonema flexuosum Meneghini ex Kützing
- Scytonema foliicola De Wildeman
  - Scytonema foliicola var. maius N.L.Gardner
- Scytonema fremyi Desikachary
- Scytonema fritschii S.L.Ghose
- Scytonema furcatum Meneghini ex Trevisan
- Scytonema geitleri Bharadwaja
  - Scytonema geitleri var. tenuis Bharadwaja
- Scytonema gomontii Gutwinski
- Scytonema granulatum G.Martens
- Scytonema guyanense Bornet & Flahault
  - Scytonema guyanense var. minus N.L.Gardner
  - Scytonema guyanense var. prolifera Bharadwaja
- Scytonema hamelinii Gebelein
- Scytonema hansgirgii Schmidle
- Scytonema hieronymi Schmidle
- Scytonema hofmanii C.Agardh ex Bornet & Flahault
  - Scytonema hofmanii f. phormidioides Frémy
  - Scytonema hofmanii var. calcicola Hansgirg
  - Scytonema hofmanii var. crassum Bharadwaja
  - Scytonema hofmanii var. symplocoides Bornet & Flahault
- Scytonema holstii Hieronymous
- Scytonema hormocystum Zhu, 1987
- Scytonema hyalinum N.L.Gardner
- Scytonema immersum H.C.Wood
- Scytonema inaequale Kufferath
- Scytonema incrassatum C.-C.Jao
- Scytonema induratum J.J.Copeland
- Scytonema insigne West & G.S.West
- Scytonema insulare C.L.Sant'Anna
- Scytonema intermedium De Wildeman
- Scytonema intertextum Rabenhorst
  - Scytonema involvens var. elongatum Bourrelly
- Scytonema iyengarii Bharadwaja
- Scytonema javanicum Bornet ex Bornet & Flahault
  - Scytonema javanicum var. distortum N.L.Gardner
  - Scytonema javanicum var. hawaiiense Lemmermann
  - Scytonema javanicum var. pallidum N.L.Gardner
- Scytonema julianum Meneghini ex B.A.Whitton
- Scytonema junipericola Farlow
- Scytonema keiense Weber-van Bosse
- Scytonema kwangsiense C.-C.Jao
- Scytonema leprieurii Montagne ex Bornet & Flahault
- Scytonema leptobasis Ghose
- Scytonema longiarticulatum N.L.Gardner
- Scytonema lyngbyoides N.L.Gardner
- Scytonema maculiforme Schmidle
- Scytonema magnum N.L.Gardner
- Scytonema malaviyanense Bharadwaja
- Scytonema masonianum H.Welsh
- Scytonema millei Bornet ex Bornet & Flahault
  - Scytonema millei var. maius N.L.Gardner
- Scytonema minus (Schmidle) Lemmermann
  - Scytonema minus var. istvanffianum Kol
- Scytonema mirabile Bornet
  - Scytonema mirabile f. minus Bharadwaja
  - Scytonema mirabile f. zonatum Geitler
  - Scytonema mirabile var. majus N.L.Gardner
  - Scytonema mirabile var. rhaeticum Brügge
- Scytonema multiramosum N.L.Gardner
  - Scytonema multiramosum var. ceylonicum Bharadwaja
- Scytonema myochrous C.Agardh ex Bornet & Flahault
  - Scytonema myochrous var. decumbens (Kützing) Rabenhorst
- Scytonema obscurum Hansgirg ex Hirn
  - Scytonema obscurum var. terrestre Hansgirg
- Scytonema occidentale Setchell
- Scytonema ocellatum Lyngbye ex Bornet & Flahault
  - Scytonema ocellatum var. capitatum Ghose
  - Scytonema ocellatum var. constrictum N.L.Gardner
  - Scytonema ocellatum var. maius N.L.Gardner
  - Scytonema ocellatum var. purpureum N.L.Gardner
- Scytonema olivaceum Zeller
- Scytonema orientale C.-C.Jao
- Scytonema papillicapitatum C.L.Sant'Anna & J.Komárek
- Scytonema papuasicum Borzì
- Scytonema parlatorii Fiorini-Mazzanti ex Bornet & Flahault
- Scytonema parvulum Zeller
- Scytonema pascheri Bharadwaja
- Scytonema pellucidum C.Cramer
- Scytonema planum Copeland
- Scytonema polycystum Bornet & Flahault
  - Scytonema polycystum var. aethiopicum West & G.S.West
- Scytonema polymorphum Jaag
- Scytonema praegnans Skuja
- Scytonema pratii Komárek
- Scytonema pseudoguyanense Bharadwaja
- Scytonema pseudohofmanii Bharadwaja
- Scytonema pseudopunctatum Skuja
- Scytonema pulchellum N.L.Gardner
- Scytonema pulvinatum Nordstedt
- Scytonema punctatum N.L.Gardner
- Scytonema racovitzae De Wildeman
- Scytonema rhizophorae Zeller
- Scytonema rivulare Borzì ex Bornet & Flahault
  - Scytonema saleyeriense var. indica Bharadwaja
- Scytonema saleyeriense Weber-van Bosse
- Scytonema samoense Wille
- Scytonema sanpaulense Sant'Anna
- Scytonema santannae Hentschke & J.Komárek
- Scytonema schmidlei J.B.De Toni
- Scytonema schmidtii Gomont
- Scytonema seagriefianum Welsh
- Scytonema siculum Borzì ex Bornet & Flahault
- Scytonema simmeri Schmidle
- Scytonema simplex Bharadwaja
  - Scytonema simplex f. majus Vasishta
- Scytonema simplice Wood
- Scytonema sinense C.-C.Jao
- Scytonema singhii Singh
- Scytonema spirulinoides N.L.Gardner
- Scytonema splendens F.E.Fritsch & F.Rich
- Scytonema stuposum Bornet ex Bornet & Flahault
- Scytonema stygium Heufler
- Scytonema subclavatum Zeller
- Scytonema subcoactile C.-C.Jao
  - Scytonema subcoactile var. aurantiacum Sarthou, Thérézien & Couté
- Scytonema subgelatinosum N.L.Gardner
- Scytonema subtile K.Möbius
- Scytonema tenellum N.L.Gardner
- Scytonema tenue N.L.Gardner
- Scytonema thermale Friedrich Traugott KützingKützing
- Scytonema tolypothrichoides Friedrich Traugott KützingKützing ex Bornet & Flahault
  - Scytonema tolypotrichoides f. terrestris Bharadwaja
- Scytonema tomentosum Kützing
- Scytonema torulosum C.-C.Jao
  - Scytonema turicense var. muscicola Hepp
- Scytonema twymanianum Welsh
- Scytonema variabile N.L.Gardner
- Scytonema varium Kützing ex Bornet & Flahault
- Scytonema vieillardii G.Martens
- Scytonema violascens Zeller
- Scytonema wolleanum Forti
- Scytonema zellerianum Brühl & Biswas
