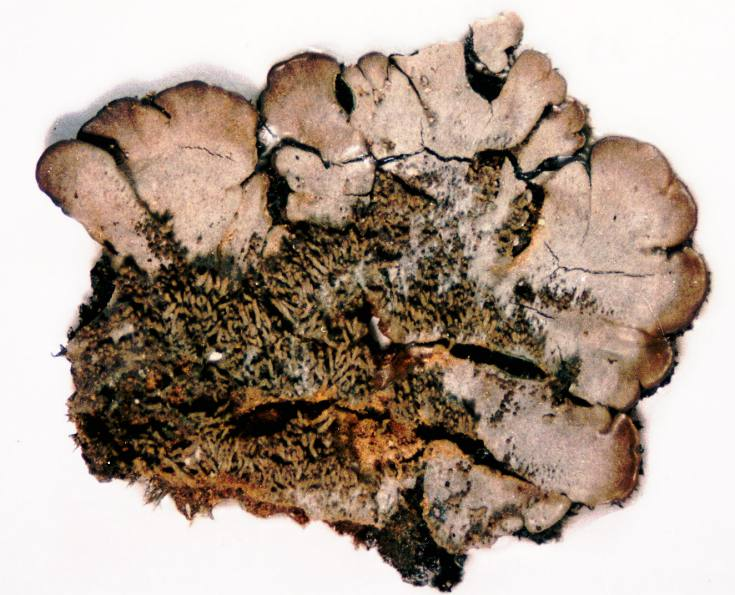
- A herbarium specimen of Coccocarpia palmicola

Scientific classification
- Kingdom: Fungi
- Division: Ascomycota
- Class: Lecanoromycetes
- Order: Peltigerales
- Family: Coccocarpiaceae; Henssen (1986)

Type genus
- Coccocarpia Pers. (1827)

Genera
- Coccocarpia; Peltularia; Spilonema

= Coccocarpiaceae =

Family of lichen

The Coccocarpiaceae are a family of lichen-forming in the order Peltigerales. There are three genera and about 60 species in the family. Species in this family have a widespread distribution, including boreal and austral regions.

== Genera ==
- Coccocarpia Pers. (1827) – 20 spp.
- Peltularia R.Sant. (1944) – 4 spp.
- Spilonema Bornet (1856) – 4 spp.
