= Aino Henssen =

German lichenologist (1925–2011)

Aino Marjatta Henssen (12 April 1925, Elberfeld – 29 August 2011, Marburg), was a German lichenologist and systematist. Her father, Gottfried Henssen, was a folklorist and her mother was Finnish.

== Education and career ==
Henssen began her studies in biology in Freiburg, Germany, before continuing in Marburg. She obtained her doctorate in 1953, which focused on the physiology of the aquatic plant Spirodela polyrhiza. In 1963, she became the curator of the Botanisches Institut at Philipps-Universität in Marburg, Germany. Following her habilitation in 1965, she was appointed in 1970 to the position of associate professor for thallophyte studies. She retired in 1990.

== Contributions ==
Henssen made many advancements to the taxonomic knowledge of cyanolichens and wrote a textbook on the subject. This book reorganized the taxonomic classification and connected lichen families to evolutionary clades. She later focused on actinomycetes during her postdoctoral at the Institute for Bacteriology in Berlin, leading to the discovery of two new genera, Pseudonocardia and Thermomonospora. In total, she described 3 orders, 3 families, 21 genera and more than 200 species of lichen-forming fungi.

She was passionate towards her field work, which took her around the world to collect specimens; her private specimen collection totalled more than 40,000 items. Over the years, Henssen published many scientific articles on topics relating to lichens, fungi and the systematics of these groups. Henssen published 113 scientific works on lichens between 1963 and 2007. Her final work was published in 2007, 17 years after retirement. She has been credited for having introduced the term pycnoascocarp in a 1963 publication, referring to a specific type of fruiting body characteristic of the family Lichinaceae.

Henssen published two exsiccatae, namely Lichenes cyanophili exsiccati (1969) and Lichenes cyanophili et fungi saxicolae exsiccati (1990).

== Recognition ==
Henssen was given a scholarship from the American Association of University Women. A Festschrift was published in her honour on the occasion of her 65th birthday in 1990. In 1992, she was honoured with an Acharius Medal for her lifetime contributions to lichenology.

=== Eponymy ===
Several taxa have been named to honour Henssen, including the genus Ainoa Lumbsch & I.Schmitt (2001) and the species Caloplaca hensseniana Kalb (1990); Diploschistes hensseniae Lumbsch & Elix (1985); Gyalidea hensseniae Hafellner, Poelt & Vězda (1990); Lecanora hensseniae Vänskä (1986); Nephroma hensseniae P.James & F.J.White (1987); Parmotrema hensseniae Krog (1990); Rhizocarpon hensseniae Brodo (1990); Rimularia hensseniae Hertel & Rambold (1990); Stephanocyclos henssenianus Hertel (1983); Sticta ainoae D.Galloway & J.Pickering (1990); and Xanthoparmelia hensseniae O.Blanco, A.Crespo, Elix, D.Hawksw. & Lumbsch (2004).

== See also ==
- Category:Taxa named by Aino Henssen
