= Dictyonema gomezianum =

Scientific classification
- Kingdom: Fungi
- Division: Basidiomycota
- Class: Agaricomycetes
- Order: Agaricales
- Family: Hygrophoraceae
- Genus: Dictyonema
- Species: D. gomezianum

Binomial name
- Dictyonema gomezianum Lücking, Dal-Forno & Lawrey (2015)
- Holotype: Las Cruces Biological Station, Costa Rica

Species of lichen

Dictyonema gomezianum is a little-known filamentous, blue-green basidiolichen in the family Hygrophoraceae. It forms dense, shimmering blue-green mats up to 5 cm (2 in) across that grow on tree bark and mosses in mountain rainforests. The species is known only from Costa Rica, where it was discovered at Las Cruces Biological Station at an elevation of 1,200 meters. It is closely related to Dictyonema metallicum but can be distinguished by its narrower fungal threads and has only been found in a sterile state without reproductive structures.

== Taxonomy ==
Dictyonema gomezianum was described as a new species in 2015 by Robert Lücking, Manuela Dal-Forno, and James D. Lawrey. The holotype specimen of Dictyonema gomezianum was collected in 2004 on a moss-flecked tree trunk at Las Cruces Biological Station (1,200 m elevation) and is preserved in the National Herbarium of Costa Rica (CR); an isotype (duplicate) resides at the Field Museum (F). Phylogenetic analyses place D. gomezianum as the sister species of D. metallicum. Although genetic divergence between the two is considerable, their macro-morphology differs only subtly, prompting the authors to diagnose D. gomezianum chiefly by its narrower cyanobacterial filaments and very slender fungal hyphae. No secondary metabolites were detected in the collected samples using thin-layer chromatography.

== Description ==
The lichen forms a dense, appressed mat up to 5 cm (2 in) across. Its thallus (the vegetative body) consists of horizontal, interwoven fibrils whose dark aeruginous (blue-green) color is intensified by a metallic shimmer produced by a gelatinous matrix. A broad, white, cottony prothallus outlines each patch and contrasts with the glossy interior.

In section, the thallus is 50–100 micrometres (μm) thick and organized into an irregular photobiont layer over a loose medulla. The photobiont is the cyanobacterium Rhizonema, arranged in filaments 7–9 μm wide and 3–5 μm tall; occasional yellowish heterocysts (specialized cells that fix atmospheric nitrogen) punctuate the strands. These filaments are ensheathed by a thin wall of tightly packed fungal cells forming a paraplectenchymatous (brick-like) lattice. Associated fungal hyphae are straight, only 2–3 μm wide, and lack clamp connections, a microscopic feature that in other basidiomycetes helps distribute nuclei evenly between cells. The surface of the prothallus is largely made of empty hyphal sheaths mixed with similarly slender hyphae. Reproductive structures (hymenophores) have not been observed, and the species is known only in the sterile state.

== Habitat and distribution ==
Dictyonema gomezianum grows as an epiphyte on tree bark and over neighboring bryophytes in lower montane rainforest around 1,200 m elevation. All confirmed material comes from the Las Cruces area of Puntarenas Province, but the authors suggest it is part of the wider Chocó floristic region that spans southern Central America and north-western South America.
