= Dictyonema phyllophilum =

Scientific classification
- Kingdom: Fungi
- Division: Basidiomycota
- Class: Agaricomycetes
- Order: Agaricales
- Family: Hygrophoraceae
- Genus: Dictyonema
- Species: D. phyllophilum

Binomial name
- Dictyonema phyllophilum (Parmasto) Lücking, Dal-Forno & Lawrey (2013)

Synonyms
- Dictyonema sericeum f. phyllophilum Parmasto (1977)

Species of lichen

Dictyonema phyllophilum is a little-known species of basidiolichen in the family Hygrophoraceae. It is found in Borneo.

== Taxonomy ==
The species was originally described by Erast Parmasto in 1978 as a form of the broadly conceived species Dictyonema sericeum. Parmasto's taxonomic concept emphasized characteristics of the fungal fruiting structures while considering variation in the lichen body to be taxonomically unimportant. Subsequent molecular phylogenetics studies revealed that D. sericeum as traditionally understood actually comprised numerous distinct species. This led to the recognition of D. phyllophilum as a distinct species by Robert Lücking, Manuela Dal-Forno, and James D. Lawrey and its formal transfer to its current name in 2013. The holotype specimen was collected by Odoardo Beccari in Sarawak, Malaysian Borneo, and is housed in the Berlin herbarium, with a duplicate specimen in Vienna.

== Description ==
Dictyonema phyllophilum is characterized by a distinctive white hypothallus formed by a well-developed medullary layer that projects laterally beyond the main thallus (lichen body). All known specimens are sterile, lacking the reproductive structures typical of many related species. Despite morphological similarities to Dictyonema aeruginosulum, molecular data indicate the two species are not closely related phylogenetically. It is also somewhat similar to D. obscuratum, but this Brazilian species differ in having dark olive-green fibrils that are densely and irregularly interwoven, and in lacking a distinct hypothallus.
