= Dictyonema giganteum =

Scientific classification
- Kingdom: Fungi
- Division: Basidiomycota
- Class: Agaricomycetes
- Order: Agaricales
- Family: Hygrophoraceae
- Genus: Dictyonema
- Species: D. giganteum

Binomial name
- Dictyonema giganteum L.Y.Vargas, Moncada & Lücking (2014)
- Holotype: Finca El Triunfo, Colombia

Species of lichen

Dictyonema giganteum is a species of lichen-forming fungus in the family Hygrophoraceae. It is a basidiolichen—its fungal partner belongs to the Basidiomycota rather than the more typical Ascomycota. The species was discovered and described in 2014 from specimens collected in the cloud forests of Colombia's eastern Andes. As its name suggests, it forms unusually large, shelf-like lobes that can reach up to 12 cm (4.7 in) across. The lichen is covered with dense white hairs that give it a frosted appearance and is known only from a small area of sub-montane cloud forest in Casanare Department, Colombia.

== Taxonomy ==
Dictyonema giganteum was described in 2014 by Lina Vargas, Bibiana Moncada and Robert Lücking from material collected in the eastern Andean foothills of Colombia. Molecular work places it in the D. sericeum (sensu stricto, in the strict sense) clade, a group of filamentous taxa that form semicircular lobes on bark. Within that lineage it is closest to D. discocarpum and two still-unnamed Colombian and Ecuadorian species, but differs from all of them in its sheer size and the abundance of white, hair-like setae. The epithet giganteum refers to the unusually large lobes that characterise the lichen.

== Description ==
The lichen grows as semicircular, shelf-like lobes that jut horizontally from tree trunks and branches. Individual lobes can reach 12 cm (4.7 in) across, making whole colonies conspicuous even from a distance. Each lobe is densely woven from cyanobacterial filaments (the photobiont component), which give the surface a dark bluish-green tone. Those threads are partly hidden beneath countless white setae, tiny, tufted hairs produced by the fungus, that impart a frosted look. Around the margin the setae coalesce into a broad, cottony rim known as a prothallus, a zone of fungal hyphae that extends beyond the lichenised tissue.

In cross-section the thallus (the main body of the lichen) is 0.35–0.45 mm thick, not counting the overlying setae. A photobiont layer packed with chains of cyanobacterial cells sits just beneath the surface; individual cells are 8–11 μm wide and capped by a thin jacket of fungus cells with a jigsaw-puzzle outline. Occasional heterocysts, which are specialised yellowish cells that fix nitrogen, punctuate the filaments. Below the photobiont layer the fungus forms a loose medulla of hyphae up to 75 μm deep. Sexual reproduction occurs on the underside, where pale yellow hymenophore patches up to 4 mm long bear basidia (spore-forming clubs); however, spores were not observed in the type material. Standard chemical spot tests and thin-layer chromatography did not detect any lichen substances in Dictyonema giganteum.

== Habitat and distribution ==
Dictyonema giganteum is known to occur only in the eastern slope of Colombia's Cordillera Oriental, in Casanare Department, at elevations of about 1,400–1,450 m (4,590–4,760 ft). It grows epiphytically on the bark of living trees and stems in semi-exposed microsites, often mingled with red-brown liverworts of the genus Frullania and other lichens. The type and paratype collections came from premontane cloud forest remnants where frequent mist and high humidity keep the bark persistently moist.
