= Acantholichen pannarioides =

Scientific classification
- Domain: Eukaryota
- Kingdom: Fungi
- Division: Basidiomycota
- Class: Agaricomycetes
- Order: Agaricales
- Family: Hygrophoraceae
- Genus: Acantholichen
- Species: A. pannarioides

Binomial name
- Acantholichen pannarioides P.M.Jørg. (1998)

Species of lichen

Acantholichen pannarioides is a species of basidiolichen in the family Hygrophoraceae, and the type species of genus Acantholichen. The lichen has a bluish-tinged, gelatinous thallus with a surface texture that has a powdery to hairy texture. It is found in montane regions of Central America and northern South America, where it grows on forest litter, bark, on bryophytes, and on other lichens.

== Taxonomy ==
Both the genus Acantholichen and species were described as new to science in 1998 by Norwegian lichenologist Per Magnus Jørgensen. The type specimen was collected by Peter Döbbeler and Josef Poelt on the southern slope of Barva Volcano in central Costa Rica, at an elevation between 1,580 and 1,700 m (5,180 and 5,580 ft). The specific epithet alludes to the lichen's superficial resemblance to some members of the family Pannariaceae, while the generic names refers to the characteristic acanthohyphidia. A 2009 molecular phylogenetics study showed that the species was indeed a basidiolichen, and belonged to the Dictyonema clade in the family Hygrophoraceae. Another analysis suggested that the foliose genus Corella might be most closely related to Acantholichen. Acantholichen pannarioides was the sole species in the genus until five additional Acantholichen species were described as new to science from the Galápagos, Costa Rica, Brazil, and Colombia in 2016.

== Description ==
The thallus of Acantholichen pannarioides comprises gelatinous, bluish-gray squamules measuring 1–2 mm long. The margins of the squamules eventually curl upward to reveal a non-corticated lower surface covered with coarse soredia. The upper thallus surface appears either pruinose (dusted) or hairy; with appearance is a result of spiny structures called acanthohyphidia; these structures are also on the lower cortex-lacking surface. According to Jørgensen, when viewed with a microscope, the acanthohyphidia "give the surface the appearance of an unshaven chin", and "resemble the spiny clubs of Roman gladiators".

The photobiont partner of the lichen is from the cyanobacterial genus Scytonema, which are localised in curled clumps in the central part of the thallus. The lichen does not produce any secondary chemicals that are detectable with thin-layer chromatography.
