= Dictyonema hernandezii =

Scientific classification
- Domain: Eukaryota
- Kingdom: Fungi
- Division: Basidiomycota
- Class: Agaricomycetes
- Order: Agaricales
- Family: Hygrophoraceae
- Genus: Dictyonema
- Species: D. hernandezii

Binomial name
- Dictyonema hernandezii Lücking, Lawrey & Dal-Forno (2011)

Species of basidiolichen

Dictyonema hernandezii is a species of basidiolichen in the family Hygrophoraceae. Found in montane rainforests of Costa Rica and in Colombia, it was described as new to science in 2011. The specific epithet hernandezii honours Venezuelan lichenologist Jesús Hernández.

== Taxonomy ==
Dictyonema hernandezii was first scientifically described by lichenologists Robert Lücking, James D. Lawrey, and Manuela Dal-Forno. They dedicated the new species to their colleague and friend, Venezuelan lichenologist Jesús Hernández, who also collected the type specimen. The lichen is part of the group formed by Dictyonema sericeum and its relatives, which are characterised by a filamentous thallus with a distinctive fungal sheath surrounding cyanobacterial filaments.

== Description ==
The thallus of Dictyonema hernandezii starts as a small, circular crust, and eventually covers large areas of its substrate. It appears gelatinous when wet and has a smooth, shiny surface when dry. The thallus is 300–500 μm thick and comprises a dominant medullary layer with numerous interwoven hyphae. The cyanobacterial filaments are blue-green to yellow-green, with cells measuring 10–12 μm wide and 3–5 μm high.

One of the main distinguishing features of this species is its peculiar thallus morphology and anatomy. It is strongly compacted and has a unique heteromerous structure, which is otherwise only known from Dictyonema glabratum and its relatives. However, Dictyonema hernandezii is phylogenetically more closely related to species in the Dictyonema sericeum group. The Ecuadorian D. metallicum, described as a new species in 2013, is morphologically similar to D. hernandezii. It is distinguished by its thin, completely appressed thallus, and its dark blue colour that, when dry, takes on a metallic shimmer.

== Habitat and distribution ==
Dictyonema hernandezii has been found in two collections in the montane rainforests of southern Costa Rica. It shares its habitat with Dictyonema glabratum and Dictyonema sericeum, and can be found growing on branches within disturbed rainforest patches. The species has been recorded at an elevation of around 1,200 m (3,900 ft) in the Las Cruces Biological Station and Wilson Botanical Garden within the Pacific La Amistad Conservation Area. It has also been recorded from Valle del Cauca in western Colombia.
