= Acantholichen campestris =

Scientific classification
- Kingdom: Fungi
- Division: Basidiomycota
- Class: Agaricomycetes
- Order: Agaricales
- Family: Hygrophoraceae
- Genus: Acantholichen
- Species: A. campestris

Binomial name
- Acantholichen campestris Dal-Forno, A.A.Spielm. & Lücking (2016)

Species of lichen-forming fungus

Acantholichen campestris is a species of basidiolichen in the family Hygrophoraceae. Found in Brazil, it was formally described as a new species in 2016 by Manuela Dal-Forno, Adriano Spielmann, and Robert Lücking. The type specimen was collected in Campos do Quiriri (Campo Alegre, Santa Catarina) at an altitude of 1,380 m (4,530 ft). Here, at the top of the mountain on exposed rocky outcrops, it was found growing on rocks growing amongst liverworts and other lichens. The specific epithet, which contains the Latin word campis (meaning "plains" or "fields"), refers to the habitat of the lichen. Acantholichen campestris is the only member of the genus which, instead of growing on bark, overgrows lichens and liverworts that inhabit rock.

== See also ==
- List of lichens of Brazil
