= Dictyonema scabridum =

Scientific classification
- Kingdom: Fungi
- Division: Basidiomycota
- Class: Agaricomycetes
- Order: Agaricales
- Family: Hygrophoraceae
- Genus: Dictyonema
- Species: D. scabridum

Binomial name
- Dictyonema scabridum (Vain.) Lücking (2013)

Synonyms
- Rhipidonema irpicinum f. scabridum Vain. (1923); Dictyonema ligulatum f. scabridum (Vain.) Parmasto (1977)

Species of lichen

Dictyonema scabridum is a species of basidiolichen in the family Hygrophoraceae. Found in the Philippines, it was originally described by the Finnish lichenologist Edvard August Vainio in 1923. Characteristics of the lichen include its small finger-like projections and a shelf-like growth pattern.

== Taxonomy ==
Dictyonema scabridum was first formally described by Edvard August Vainio in 1923 as Rhipidonema irpicinum f. scabridum. Erast Parmasto later treated it as Dictyonema ligulatum f. scabridum in 1978, continuing to regard it as a form rather than a distinct species. However, molecular phylogenetic studies conducted in the 2010s revealed that many taxa previously considered forms or varieties within broadly defined species actually represent separate evolutionary lineages. This led to the recognition of D. scabridum as an independent species by Robert Lücking in 2013.

The lectotype specimen was collected by Georg Heinrich Weber in the Philippines and is housed in the herbarium of the University of Turku, with a duplicate specimen in Vienna.

== Description ==
Dictyonema scabridum is characterized by its distinctive morphological features, including small finger-like projections and a shelf-like growth pattern. The species can be distinguished from the similar Dictyonema irpicinum by the presence of densely arranged fibrils that form an almost compact surface, giving the lichen a rougher texture. Like D. irpicinum, it has clamp connections in its fungal hyphae, a microscopic feature that helps differentiate it from some related species such as Dictyonema aeruginosulum.
