= Acantholichen variabilis =

Scientific classification
- Kingdom: Fungi
- Division: Basidiomycota
- Class: Agaricomycetes
- Order: Agaricales
- Family: Hygrophoraceae
- Genus: Acantholichen
- Species: A. variabilis

Binomial name
- Acantholichen variabilis Dal-Forno, Coca & Lücking (2016)

Species of lichen

Acantholichen variabilis is a species of basidiolichen in the family Hygrophoraceae. Found in Colombia, it was formally described as a new species in 2016 by Manuela Dal-Forno, Luis Fernando Coca, and Robert Lücking. The type specimen was collected in Cerro San Antonio at an elevation of 1,946 m (6,385 ft). Here, on the edge of a montane wet forest, the lichen was found growing on moss in an area with high light intensity. The specific epithet refers to the variable size of the acanthohyphidia (spiny apical cells) in the lichen. The species is only known from the type locality. Acantholichen albomarginatus is also found at this location.
