= Dictyonema subobscuratum =

Scientific classification
- Domain: Eukaryota
- Kingdom: Fungi
- Division: Basidiomycota
- Class: Agaricomycetes
- Order: Agaricales
- Family: Hygrophoraceae
- Genus: Dictyonema
- Species: D. subobscuratum

Binomial name
- Dictyonema subobscuratum Dal-Forno, Bungartz & Lücking (2017)

Species of lichen

Dictyonema subobscuratum is a species of basidiolichen in the family Hygrophoraceae. It is endemic to the Galápagos Islands, where it mostly grows as an epiphyte over bryophytes on branches and trunks in humid zones. It was formally described as a new species in 2017 by Manuela Dal-Forno, Frank Bungartz, and Robert Lücking. The type specimen was collected on Floreana Island along the rim trail to Cerro Pajas at an altitude of 442 m (1,450 ft); it has also been recorded from Santa Cruz Island. The lichen forms dark bluish-green filamentous, irregular mats that grow in patches up to 5 cm (2.0 in) across. The specific epithet subobscuratum refers to its similarity with Dictyonema obscuratum, found in Brazil.
