= Dictyonema barbatum =

Scientific classification
- Domain: Eukaryota
- Kingdom: Fungi
- Division: Basidiomycota
- Class: Agaricomycetes
- Order: Agaricales
- Family: Hygrophoraceae
- Genus: Dictyonema
- Species: D. barbatum

Binomial name
- Dictyonema barbatum Dal-Forno, Bungartz & Lücking (2017)

Species of lichen

Dictyonema barbatum is a species of basidiolichen in the family Hygrophoraceae. It is endemic to the Galápagos Islands, where it grows as an epiphyte on the bark of branches and trunks, often on introduced plants such as avocado and guava trees. It was formally described as a new species in 2017 by Manuela Dal-Forno, Frank Bungartz, and Robert Lücking. The type specimen was collected near the southern crater rim of the Sierra Negra, at an altitude of 1,055 m (3,461 ft). Its preferred habitat is open areas with lots of rainfall and light exposure. The lichen forms shelf-like, filamentous brackets comprising individual semicircular lobes up to 8 cm (3 in) wide. The specific epithet barbatum refers to the "beard-like" white hairs on the shelf margins, a characteristic feature of this species. These "hairs" are sheaths of fungal hyphae that lack photobiont filaments.
