= Dictyonema subsericeum =

Scientific classification
- Kingdom: Fungi
- Division: Basidiomycota
- Class: Agaricomycetes
- Order: Agaricales
- Family: Hygrophoraceae
- Genus: Dictyonema
- Species: D. subsericeum

Binomial name
- Dictyonema subsericeum Marcano (2022)

Species of lichen

Dictyonema subsericeum is a species of basidiolichen in the family Hygrophoraceae. It was described as a new species in 2022 by the Venezuelan lichenologist Vicente Marcano. The holotype was collected by Marcano and L. Castillo on 5 June 2020 from the cloud forests of Raiz de Agua in Mérida National Park (Parque Sierra Nevada de Mérida), Mérida, Venezuela. The specimen, designated as Marcano & Castillo 20-84, is housed in the herbarium of the Universidad de Los Andes (MER). The lichen was found growing epiphytically on branches in the rainforest canopy.
