= Dictyonema duidense =

Scientific classification
- Kingdom: Fungi
- Division: Basidiomycota
- Class: Agaricomycetes
- Order: Agaricales
- Family: Hygrophoraceae
- Genus: Dictyonema
- Species: D. duidense

Binomial name
- Dictyonema duidense Marcano (2022)

Species of lichen

Dictyonema duidense is a species of basidiolichen in the family Hygrophoraceae. It was described as a new species in 2022 by the Venezuelan lichenologist Vicente Marcano. The holotype was collected by L. Galiz and Marcano in March 1996 from the northern summit of Cerro Duida in the Alto Orinoco Municipality, Amazonas, Venezuela. The specimen, designated as Galiz & Marcano AMA-757, is housed in the herbarium of the Universidad de Los Andes (MER). The lichen was found growing epiphytically on tree bark in altotepuian forests.
