= Dictyonema krogiae =

Scientific classification
- Kingdom: Fungi
- Division: Basidiomycota
- Class: Agaricomycetes
- Order: Agaricales
- Family: Hygrophoraceae
- Genus: Dictyonema
- Species: D. krogiae

Binomial name
- Dictyonema krogiae Lücking & Timdal (2016)

Species of lichen

Dictyonema krogiae is a species of basidiolichen in the family Hygrophoraceae. It is found in Kenya, where it grows as an epiphyte on trees. It is often found in association with other lichens, such as Parmotrema, and bryophytes, such as Frullania. A main characteristic that distinguishes it from other closely related species is its clearly defined internal layers, including its contrasting dense photobiont layer and a loose lower cortex.

== Taxonomy ==
The lichen was formally described as a new species by lichenologists Robert Lücking and Einar Timdal in 2016. The type specimen was collected from a moist deciduous forest on Mount Kenya (Kirinyaga County, Central Province) at an elevation of 2,000 m (6,600 ft). The species epithet honours Norwegian lichenologist Hildur Krog, "for her invaluable contributions to African lichenology". The type locality is quite rich in species, and Krog made nearly 200 collections there.

Dictyonema krogiae is a member of the Dictyonema sericeum species complex, a group of species sharing similar overall morphology, including shelf-like, filamentous lobes.

== Description ==
The thallus of the lichen is filamentous and forms semi-circular shapes that can range from adnate to projecting shelves up to 10 cm (4 in) across, with single lobes 1–6 cm (0.4–2.4 in) wide. The fibrils are densely arranged, horizontally radiating and parallel, and are a dark greenish-blue (aeruginous) color without or with indistinct spaces in between. The thallus has a thick, byssoid, irregularly interlaced medulla, known as a hypothallus, which is visible as a narrow line along the margin and strongly contrasts with the aeruginous fibrils.

Viewed microscopically in cross-section, the thallus is 400–500 μm thick and ecorticate, meaning that it lacks a distinct outer layer. The photobiont layer is fully exposed and well-defined, with a thickness of 100–150 μm. The medulla, made up of very loosely woven hyphae, is 200–300 μm thick, and there is a lower "cortex" composed of more densely woven hyphae that is about 50 μm thick. The photobiont layer consists of numerous, periclinally arranged, parallel fibrils formed by cyanobacterial filaments wrapped in a closed hyphal sheath of jigsaw-puzzle-shaped cells. The fibrils are 15–20 μm wide, with a hyphal sheath that is 2–3 μm thick. The cyanobacterial filaments are composed of 12–15 μm wide and 5–7 μm high, aeruginous green cells penetrated by tubular fungal hyphae. The heterocytes, sparse in distribution and ranging from hyaline to yellowish, measure 11–13 μm wide and 4–6 μm high. Cells of the hyphal sheath, undulating in profile, have a diameter of 3–5 μm. In surface fibrils and towards the thallus margin, they are often shallowly verrucose-papillose. The hyphae of the medulla, lower "cortex" (hypothallus), and white bordering line (prothallus) are straight, much branched, and 4–6 μm thick, lacking clamp connections.

In Dictyonema krogiae, the hymenophore, which is the spore-producing structure, is only modestly developed. It manifests as soft, irregular patches of effuse or flattened growth on the thallus underside, bearing resupinate characteristics. These patches have a diameter of 0.5–1 mm, are slightly convex, and have a whitish, smooth surface with indistinct margins. Viewed in microscopic cross-section, the hymenophore is 70–150 μm thick and is composed of a paraplectenchymatous tissue layer resting on strongly agglutinated, 4–6 μm thick, generative hyphae that emerge from the supporting thallus. The hymenium is composed of numerous, palisade-like basidioles and scattered basidia. The basidioles are 20–30 by 5–6 μm, and the basidia are 30–40 by 5–7 μm and have 4 sterigmata. Only a few basidiospores have been documented; they are ellipsoid, hyaline, lack any septa, and measure 7–10 by 3–4 μm.
