= Dictyonema andinum =

Scientific classification
- Kingdom: Fungi
- Division: Basidiomycota
- Class: Agaricomycetes
- Order: Agaricales
- Family: Hygrophoraceae
- Genus: Dictyonema
- Species: D. andinum

Binomial name
- Dictyonema andinum Marcano (2022)

Species of lichen

Dictyonema andinum is a species of basidiolichen in the family Hygrophoraceae. It was described as a new species in 2022 by the Venezuelan lichenologist Vicente Marcano. The holotype was collected by Marcano and L. Castillo on 12 October 2020 from Raiz de Agua in Sierra Nevada National Park (Parque Sierra Nevada de Mérida), Mérida, Venezuela. The specimen, designated as Marcano & Castillo 20-535, is housed in the herbarium of the Universidad de Los Andes (MER). The lichen was found growing on mosses and acidic soils in partly exposed, very humid rainforest, where it occurred in association with Dibaeis absoluta and Cladonia ceratophylla.
