= Dictyonema irrigatum =

Scientific classification
- Kingdom: Fungi
- Division: Basidiomycota
- Class: Agaricomycetes
- Order: Agaricales
- Family: Hygrophoraceae
- Genus: Dictyonema
- Species: D. irrigatum

Binomial name
- Dictyonema irrigatum (Berk. & M.A.Curtis) Lücking (2013)

Synonyms
- Corticium irrigatum Berk. & M.A.Curtis (1860); Terana irrigata (Berk. & M.A.Curtis) Kuntze (1891)

Species of lichen

Dictyonema irrigatum is a species of basidiolichen in the family Hygrophoraceae. It was originally described as a new species in 1860 by Miles Joseph Berkeley and Moses Ashley Curtis, who classified it as a member of the fungal genus Corticium. In their Latin description, Berkeley and Curtis characterized the species as having a thin, reflexed cap with a wrinkled-tomentose (woolly) surface and a smooth, cream-coloured hymenium (spore-bearing surface). They noted that it formed dense patches on rocks and recorded the type locality as Hong Kong. Robert Lücking transferred the species to the genus Dictyonema in 2013.
