= Dictyonema applanatum =

Scientific classification
- Kingdom: Fungi
- Division: Basidiomycota
- Class: Agaricomycetes
- Order: Agaricales
- Family: Hygrophoraceae
- Genus: Dictyonema
- Species: D. applanatum

Binomial name
- Dictyonema applanatum Lücking, Dal-Forno & Wilk (2013)
- Holotype: Madidi National Park, Bolivia

Species of lichen

Dictyonema applanatum is a little‑known, blue‑green basidiolichen (a lichen whose fungal partner belongs to the Basidiomycota) in the family Hygrophoraceae. Formally described as a new species in 2013, it was discovered in the cloud forests of northern Bolivia. The species carpets bark and dangling vines with a thin, felt‑like layer of microscopic threads (hyphae) that weave together the fungus and its cyanobacterial partner.

== Taxonomy ==
Dictyonema applanatum was introduced as a new species in 2013 by Robert Lücking, Manuela Dal Forno and Karina Wilk in a survey of Bolivian basidiolichens. The holotype was collected at 2,177 m (7,142 ft) elevation in Madidi National Park, La Paz Department, where it grew on a liana in lower montane rainforest. Morphologically the new taxon is set apart by a completely horizontal mat of cyanobacterial threads (fibrils) held down by a gelatinous, whitish film; this "flat" habit is echoed in the Latin epithet applanatum.

Molecular data place the species in Dictyonema in the strict sense (sensu stricto), one of five genera that make up the broader "Dictyonema clade" in the family Hygrophoraceae. Within that group D. applanatum belongs to the appressed‑filamentous grade, yet it is not closely related to the superficially similar D. metallicum from Ecuador.

== Description ==
The lichen forms a tightly pressed, turquoise‑to‑aeruginous (blue‑green) crust up to 10 cm (4 in) across. Under a hand lens it looks like a compressed felt made of countless, very fine threads lying parallel to the bark; a faint, shiny white prothallus (an edging layer of fungal tissue) peeks through in places.

Each fibril is a chain of cyanobacterial cells (about 10–12 μm wide) wrapped in a sleeve of puzzle‑piece fungal cells. The entire layer is only 30–50 μm thick and lacks a separate medulla (inner white layer) found in many lichens. Occasional heterocytes (larger, pale cells that fix nitrogen) punctuate the cyanobacterial strand. The surrounding fungal hyphae are 4–6 μm wide, smooth, and lack clamp connections (little "clips" seen in many basidiomycetes). No spore‑producing surface (hymenophore) has been observed, so the species is presumed sterile in the available material.

== Habitat and distribution ==
Dictyonema applanatum is currently known only from its Bolivian type locality, a humid, moss‑laden montane forest in Madidi National Park. It grows epiphytically on rough bark, lianas and adjacent bryophyte mats, favoring the consistently damp, shaded microclimate of Andean cloud forest canopies.
