= Acantholichen galapagoensis =

Conservation status
- Vulnerable (IUCN 3.1)

Scientific classification
- Domain: Eukaryota
- Kingdom: Fungi
- Division: Basidiomycota
- Class: Agaricomycetes
- Order: Agaricales
- Family: Hygrophoraceae
- Genus: Acantholichen
- Species: A. galapagoensis

Binomial name
- Acantholichen galapagoensis Dal-Forno, Bungartz & Lücking (2016)

Species of lichen

Acantholichen galapagoensis, commonly known as the Galapagos spiny gladiator lichen, is a species of basidiolichen in the family Hygrophoraceae. Found in the Galápagos Islands, it was formally described as a new species in 2016 by Manuela Dal-Forno, Frank Bungartz, and Robert Lücking. The type specimen was collected in Isla Santa Cruz at an elevation of 684 m (2,244 ft). Here in a dense forest of Cinchona pubescens it was found growing over Frullania liverworts. The specific epithet refers to its type locality.

In 2017, Acantholichen galapagoensis was assessed for the global IUCN Red List as vulnerable due to its fragmented population, and because population control of the invasive Cinchona trees has a direct, detrimental impact on the lichen populations associated with it.
