= Dictyonema yunnanum =

Scientific classification
- Kingdom: Fungi
- Division: Basidiomycota
- Class: Agaricomycetes
- Order: Agaricales
- Family: Hygrophoraceae
- Genus: Dictyonema
- Species: D. yunnanum

Binomial name
- Dictyonema yunnanum D.Liu, X.Y.Wang & Li S.Wang (2018)

Species of basidiolichen

Dictyonema yunnanum is a little-known species of basidiolichen in the family Hygrophoraceae. Found in a tropical area in Southwestern China, this species is characterised by its filamentous, micro-fruticulose thallus. A main distinguishing feature is the presence of erect fibrils with silvery or white tips.

== Taxonomy ==
The species was formally described in 2018 by Dong Liu, Xin-Yu Wang, and Li-Song Wang. It was given the species epithet referring to its type locality in Yunnan, China. The type specimen, collected from Mengsuo Dragon Pond Park (in Pu'er City) was found growing on moss, which itself was growing on bark. It is differentiated from D. thelephora by its erect fibrils with silvery or white tips. It is distinguished from other Dictyonema species by various morphological traits, such as its filamentous thallus, the absence of clamp connections in the hyphae, and specific features of its photobiont filaments.

== Description ==
The thallus of Dictyonema yunnanum is filamentous, ascending or erect, micro-fruticulose, and tightly interwoven. The fibrils are 1–8 mm tall and 180–248 μm thick. Its photobiont is cyanobacterial, and the lichen does not form a distinct medulla. Other characteristics of the lichen are its dark bluish-green to black filaments and the absence of a prothallus. All of the standard chemical spot tests are negative.

== Habitat and distribution ==
Dictyonema yunnanum grows on mosses over bark, co-existing with species of Cladonia, Graphis, and Sticta. This lichen is little known, having been documented from a single collection at its type locality, in the tropical area of Yunnan Province (Southwestern China).
