= Dictyonema diducens =

Scientific classification
- Kingdom: Fungi
- Division: Basidiomycota
- Class: Agaricomycetes
- Order: Agaricales
- Family: Hygrophoraceae
- Genus: Dictyonema
- Species: D. diducens

Binomial name
- Dictyonema diducens Nyl. ex Lücking (2013)

Species of lichen

Dictyonema diducens is a little-known species of filamentous basidiolichen in the family Hygrophoraceae. Found in Peru, it forms thin, smooth crusts of blue-green threads that grow over mosses and other small plants. The species creates an almost continuous carpet-like surface, distinguishing it from similar lichens that have more loosely arranged filaments.

== Taxonomy ==
The species was originally mentioned by the Finnish lichenologist William Nylander in 1885, but his description did not meet the formal requirements for a valid scientific name under botanical nomenclature rules. Robert Lücking provided a proper scientific description in 2013, formally establishing the species and crediting Nylander as the original author with the notation "Nyl. ex Lücking".

The holotype specimen comes from Peru, collected by Kurt Krause, and is housed in the Natural History Museum, London (specimen number BM-001084450). Dictyonema diducens is closely related to Dictyonema thelephora but can be distinguished by its tightly pressed filaments that form a nearly continuous crust, rather than the more open, loosely arranged structure of its relative.

== Description ==
The lichen body (thallus) grows as an epiphyte, attaching to mosses and other small non-vascular plants rather than directly to tree bark or rock. It forms a thin crust 20–50 micrometers (μm) thick composed of numerous blue-green (aeruginous) threads called fibrils. These fibrils are closely pressed against the surface and arranged either irregularly or in nearly parallel lines, creating a relatively smooth appearance. Unlike some related species, it lacks distinct outer borders or margins.

Under microscopic examination, the structure reveals cyanobacterial filaments—the lichen's photosynthetic partner—wrapped in a protective sheath formed by fungal cells. The cyanobacterial cells measure 8–14 μm wide and 4–5 μm high, with their blue-green color providing the lichen's characteristic appearance. Scattered among these are specialized pale yellow cells called heterocysts (7–12 μm wide), which help the organism fix nitrogen from the atmosphere, allowing it to survive in nutrient-poor environments.

The fungal component forms tubular threads (hyphae) that penetrate through the cyanobacterial filaments and create the protective outer sheath. The sheath cells have a distinctive wavy outline and jigsaw puzzle-like arrangement when viewed from the side. Additional free fungal threads, measuring 4–6 μm thick, are associated with this sheath structure. These hyphae lack clamp connections—small cross-wall structures found in many other fungi—which is a diagnostic feature for identification.

== Habitat and distribution ==
Dictyonema diducens grows in tropical environments where it colonizes bryophytes (mosses and liverworts) in humid conditions. The confirmed distribution includes Peru, where the type specimen was collected.
