= Dictyonema pectinatum =

Scientific classification
- Kingdom: Fungi
- Division: Basidiomycota
- Class: Agaricomycetes
- Order: Agaricales
- Family: Hygrophoraceae
- Genus: Dictyonema
- Species: D. pectinatum

Binomial name
- Dictyonema pectinatum Dal-Forno, Yánez & Lücking (2012)
- Holotype: Santa Cruz Island, Galápagos

Species of lichen

Dictyonema pectinatum is a species of lichen in the family Hygrophoraceae. It is a basidiolichen—a lichen whose fungal partner belongs to the Basidiomycota rather than the more typical Ascomycota. The species was discovered and described in 2012 from specimens found growing on the bark of introduced guava trees in the humid highlands of Santa Cruz Island in the Galápagos. It forms thin, dark olive-green films that appear as neatly arranged, glossy threads lying side-by-side like combed cloth when viewed under magnification. The lichen is known only from a small area of the Galápagos and appears to depend entirely on non-native guava trees for its habitat.

== Taxonomy ==
Dictyonema pectinatum was described as new to science in 2012 by Manuela Dal Forno, Alba Yánez and Robert Lücking during a survey of Galápagos lichens. The specific epithet, pectinatum (Latin for "combed"), refers to the unusually even, parallel arrangement of its microscopic filaments.

The holotype was collected on Santa Cruz Island (Galápagos) at roughly 470 m (1,540 ft) elevation, on the smooth bark of an introduced guava (Psidium guajava) tree. The species is morphologically and anatomically distinct from other members of the genus, especially D. schenkianum, with which it was formerly confused. Like others in Dictyonema, D. pectinatum partners with a filamentous cyanobacterium of the genus Rhizonema, but its fungal sheath and growth form set it apart.

== Description ==
Viewed in the field the lichen forms a thin, dark olive‑green film that sits flush against the bark. Under a hand lens the surface resolves into countless glossy threads (called fibrils) that lie side‑by‑side so neatly that the thallus—the lichen's body—resembles cloth that has been combed in one direction. Each fibril is built around a chain of cyanobacterial cells (photobiont trichome); the fungus wraps the chain in a transparent jacket of intricately interlocking cells. These fungal cells end in tiny bumps (papillae), giving the fibril tips a paler, frost‑like appearance. The individual cyanobacterial cells are 16–21 μm wide but only 5–9 μm tall, an unusual, flattened geometry that helps distinguish the species under the microscope.

A few pale threads of loose fungal hyphae can occur at the colony margin, but the lichen lacks a true prothallus (an un‑lichenised weft from which the thallus expands). Nor have basidiocarps (the spore‑producing fruiting bodies seen in some Dictyonema species) ever been observed, suggesting that D. pectinatum may reproduce mainly by dispersing fragments of its filamentous surface. Chemical spot tests are negative and the species has no distinctive scent or taste.

== Habitat and distribution ==
All confirmed collections of Dictyonema pectinatum come from the humid uplands of Santa Cruz Island in the Galápagos archipelago, between roughly 470 and 505 m (1,542 and 1,657 ft) above sea level. The species carpets the smooth, still‑moist bark of Psidium guajava, an invasive tree that dominates large tracts of secondary forest in the farm zone. Field notes record the lichen on shaded to half‑shaded trunks and branches where persistent mist (garúa) keeps surfaces damp for long periods. No specimens have been found on native trees, on rock, or on soil, and surveys on the neighbouring islands of Isabela and San Cristóbal have so far failed to detect it.

The extremely restricted range, combined with its apparent dependence on a single non‑native phorophyte (substrate tree), suggests that Dictyonema pectinatum is either a recent arrival or a local offshoot that evolved after the introduction of guava to the islands. Its strong affinity for high humidity also explains its confinement to the cloud‑soaked windward slopes of Santa Cruz, where moisture levels remain sufficient even during the drier season.
