= Dictyonema darwinianum =

Scientific classification
- Domain: Eukaryota
- Kingdom: Fungi
- Division: Basidiomycota
- Class: Agaricomycetes
- Order: Agaricales
- Family: Hygrophoraceae
- Genus: Dictyonema
- Species: D. darwinianum

Binomial name
- Dictyonema darwinianum Dal-Forno, Bungartz & Lücking (2017)

Species of lichen

Dictyonema darwinianum is a species of basidiolichen in the family Hygrophoraceae. It is endemic to the Galápagos Islands, where it grows as an epiphyte on the bark of branches and trunks, often closely associated with or overgrowing bryophytes and interspersed detritus. It was formally described as a new species in 2017 by Manuela Dal-Forno, Frank Bungartz, and Robert Lücking. The type specimen was collected along the trail from Bellavista to El Puntudo on Santa Cruz Island at an altitude of 502 m (1,647 ft). The lichen is common and widespread on the Galápagos Islands, where it forms dark bluish-green filamentous and crust-like mats on Frullania liverworts and associated forest detritus. The specific epithet darwinianum honours Charles Darwin and the Charles Darwin Foundation.
