= Dictyonema lawreyi =

Scientific classification
- Domain: Eukaryota
- Kingdom: Fungi
- Division: Basidiomycota
- Class: Agaricomycetes
- Order: Agaricales
- Family: Hygrophoraceae
- Genus: Dictyonema
- Species: D. lawreyi

Binomial name
- Dictyonema lawreyi Dal Forno, Kaminsky & Lücking (2019)

Species of lichen

Dictyonema lawreyi is a species of basidiolichen in the family Hygrophoraceae. Found in the United States, it was formally described as a new species in 2019 by Manuela Dal Forno, Laurel Kaminsky, and Robert Lücking. The type specimen was collected in Ocala National Forest (Marion County, Florida), where it was growing as an epiphyte on a trunk of Magnolia. It is only known to occur here and in two other locations in Florida, all in hardwood forests. The lichen has a crustose and filamentous growth form on a white hypothallus, and thallus surface made of a mat of turquoise, loosely interwoven fibrils forming more or less continuous patches up to 5 cm (2 in) long. The type was collected by lichenologist James D. Lawrey, for whom the species is named, and whose work, according to the authors, "helped to redefine the circumscription of the genus Dictyonema s.str."
