= Dictyonema caespitosum =

Scientific classification
- Kingdom: Fungi
- Division: Basidiomycota
- Class: Agaricomycetes
- Order: Agaricales
- Family: Hygrophoraceae
- Genus: Dictyonema
- Species: D. caespitosum

Binomial name
- Dictyonema caespitosum (Johow) Lücking (2013)

Synonyms
- Laudatea caespitosa Johow (1884); Dictyonema sericeum f. caespitosa (Johow) P.Metzner (1934)

Species of lichen

Dictyonema caespitosum is a species of basidiolichen in the family Hygrophoraceae. Found in Brazil, it was originally described in 1884 by the Chilean botanist Federico Johow, as Laudatea caespitosa. Robert Lücking transferred it to the genus Dictyonema in 2013. Its thallus typically grows over bryophytes, forming a thin mat of appressed, predominantly horizontal fibrils that are pale greenish-blue in color. Reproductive structures are rarely observed, with the species usually found in a sterile state. Clamp connections are present in the hyphae.
