= Dictyonema laurae =

Scientific classification
- Kingdom: Fungi
- Division: Basidiomycota
- Class: Agaricomycetes
- Order: Agaricales
- Family: Hygrophoraceae
- Genus: Dictyonema
- Species: D. laurae

Binomial name
- Dictyonema laurae Marcano (2022)

Species of lichen

Dictyonema laurae is a species of basidiolichen in the family Hygrophoraceae. It was described as a new species in 2022 by the Venezuelan lichenologist Vicente Marcano. The holotype specimen was collected by Marcano on 17 July 2021 from the cloud forests of Raiz de Agua in Mérida National Park (Parque Sierra Nevada de Mérida), Mérida, Venezuela. The specimen, designated as Marcano 21-65, is housed in the herbarium of the Universidad de Los Andes (MER). The lichen was found growing epiphytically on bryophytes in the canopy of partly shaded, very humid rainforests.
