= Dictyonema ramificans =

Scientific classification
- Domain: Eukaryota
- Kingdom: Fungi
- Division: Basidiomycota
- Class: Agaricomycetes
- Order: Agaricales
- Family: Hygrophoraceae
- Genus: Dictyonema
- Species: D. ramificans

Binomial name
- Dictyonema ramificans Dal-Forno, Yánez-Ayabaca & Lücking (2017)

Species of lichen

Dictyonema ramificans is a basidiolichen species in the family Hygrophoraceae. Discovered in 2010 in the Galapagos Islands, it was formally described as a new species in 2017 by lichenologists Manuela Dal-Forno, Alba Yanez-Ayabaca, and Robert Lücking. Its species epithet is derived from the branching pattern of the fibrils that form a net-like structure, giving it an arachnoid (cobweb-like) appearance. This species has only been found in the humid zone of Santa Cruz Island, growing exclusively on bryophytes. While it is similar to other Dictyonema species, it differs in its unique fibril branching pattern and erect arachnoid structure.

== Description ==
The lichen has a bluish-green to brownish-olive thallus that is loosely interwoven, forming irregular patches up to 10 cm (4 in) across. The basidiolichen is epiphytic and grows on bryophytes, with the thallus organized into a photobiont layer and a hypothallus, which is white and extends along the margin to form a prothallus. The photobiont is composed of numerous cyanobacterial filaments wrapped in a closed hyphal sheath, while the cyanobacterial filaments themselves are uni- or biseriate and have bluish-green cells that are often longitudinally divided. Dictyonema ramificans is characterized by the formation of an erect arachnoid pattern on top of a white hypothallus, due to the branching pattern of its fibrils. It is also notable for its resupinate patches of hymenophores, which are bulging, stereoid, and up to 6 mm long. The basidia are 20–25 by 5–7 μm, and the basidiospores are ellipsoid to narrowly drop-shaped and non-septate, with dimensions of 7–8 by 2–4 μm.
