= Acantholichen sorediatus =

Scientific classification
- Domain: Eukaryota
- Kingdom: Fungi
- Division: Basidiomycota
- Class: Agaricomycetes
- Order: Agaricales
- Family: Hygrophoraceae
- Genus: Acantholichen
- Species: A. sorediatus

Binomial name
- Acantholichen sorediatus Dal-Forno, Sipman & Lücking (2016)

Species of lichen

Acantholichen sorediatus is a species of basidiolichen in the family Hygrophoraceae. Found in Costa Rica, it was formally described as a new species in 2016 by Manuela Dal-Forno, Harrie Sipman, and Robert Lücking. The type specimen was collected from the Las Cruces Biological Station (San Vito, Puntarenas) at an altitude of 1,200 m (3,900 ft); this area is part of the Cordillera Central. Here, in the undergrowth of a disturbed primary forest, it was found growing on a tree trunk along with other lichens, including Hypotrachyna, Normandina, and Leptogium. The specific epithet refers to the soredia, found along the margins of the squamules.
