= Dictyonema umbricola =

Scientific classification
- Kingdom: Fungi
- Division: Basidiomycota
- Class: Agaricomycetes
- Order: Agaricales
- Family: Hygrophoraceae
- Genus: Dictyonema
- Species: D. umbricola

Binomial name
- Dictyonema umbricola Marcano (2022)

Species of lichen

Dictyonema umbricola is a species of basidiolichen in the family Hygrophoraceae. It was described as a new species in 2022 by the Venezuelan lichenologist Vicente Marcano. The holotype was collected by Marcano and L. Castillo on 15 June 2020 from the cloud forests of Raiz de Agua in Mérida National Park (Parque Sierra Nevada de Mérida), Mérida, Venezuela. The specimen, designated as Marcano & Castillo 20-91, is housed in the herbarium of the Universidad de Los Andes (MER). The lichen was found growing on mosses in shady and humid rainforest.
