= Dictyonema huaorani =

Scientific classification
- Kingdom: Fungi
- Division: Basidiomycota
- Class: Agaricomycetes
- Order: Agaricales
- Family: Hygrophoraceae
- Genus: Dictyonema
- Species: D. huaorani

Binomial name
- Dictyonema huaorani Dal-Forno, Schmull, Lücking & Lawrey (2014)

Species of fungus

Dictyonema huaorani is a species of basidiolichen in the family Hygrophoraceae. It is the only lichen species currently known to produce the psychedelic tryptamine alkaloids psilocybin and 5-MeO-DMT, although this remains insufficiently confirmed. It was first collected in 1981 and was first described in 2014. It has been sporadically used as an entheogen by the Waorani (Huaorani) indigenous people of the Amazon in eastern Ecuador, who refer to it as nɇnɇndapɇ.

== See also ==
- List of psychoactive plants, fungi, and animals
- Massospora levispora
