= Dictyonema metallicum =

Scientific classification
- Domain: Eukaryota
- Kingdom: Fungi
- Division: Basidiomycota
- Class: Agaricomycetes
- Order: Agaricales
- Family: Hygrophoraceae
- Genus: Dictyonema
- Species: D. metallicum

Binomial name
- Dictyonema metallicum Lücking, Dal-Forno & Lawrey (2013)

Species of lichen

Dictyonema metallicum is a species of basidiolichen in the family Hygrophoraceae. It is found in the montane rainforests of Ecuador. Characterised by its metallic shimmer, it is an epiphytic lichen that spans large areas on host tree trunks and frequently extends to adjacent bryophytes. Its unique visual texture is created by the loosely interwoven dark blue fibrils of the thallus, a thin, compressed filamentous layer, accentuated by a silver prothallus.

== Taxonomy ==
Dictyonema metallicum was first scientifically described by lichenologists Robert Lücking, Manuela Dal-Forno, and James D. Lawrey. The species name metallicum signifies the distinct metallic shimmer of the thallus, observed in dry conditions. The type specimen was discovered by the first author in the Río Guajalito Protected Forest (Pichincha Province), at an altitude of 1,800 m (5,900 ft).

== Description ==
The growth pattern of D. metallicum is epiphytic, covering large areas of the host tree trunks and often extending to nearby bryophytes. The thallus – the vegetative tissue of lichens – has a thin, compressed, and appressed filamentous texture, forming patches varying from 1–5 cm (0.4–2.0 in) in size. The dark blue fibrils of the thallus, loosely interwoven, form an unusual visual texture, while a silvery prothallus outlining the thallus contributes to a strong metallic shimmer.

A cross-section of the thallus measures 25–50 μm in thickness, primarily made up of an irregular photobiont layer. This layer consists of numerous cyanobacterial filaments, encased in a hyphal sheath, presenting a dark aeruginous blue. The constituent cells measure 10–13 μm in width and 4–6 μm in height. A detailed chemical analysis did not detect the presence of any substances through thin-layer chromatography.

== Habitat and distribution ==
Dictyonema metallicum has been found exclusively in the montane rainforest of Ecuador thus far, particularly flourishing in the understory on shaded tree trunks. The lichen does not limit its growth to tree trunks; it has also been observed overgrowing nearby epiphytic bryophytes.

== Similar species ==
Dictyonema metallicum shares similarities with the recently described D. hernandezii, particularly in the manner of their fibrils embedded in a gelatinous matrix. However, D. hernandezii possesses a thicker thallus with a more greenish photobiont colouration, distinguishing it from D. metallicum. The tiny fibrils of D. metallicum remind some observers of Cyphellostereum phyllogenum and C. nitidum, but these species do not possess the distinct hyphal sheath of D. metallicum, nor do they exhibit haustoria. Dictyonema applanatum is another species with a similar morphology to that of D. metallicum. However, D. applanatum has fibrils of a lighter, aeruginous hue and a thallus structure that is not as densely packed, and it lacks the distinct metallic sheen of D. metallicum. Despite morphological similarities, the two species are not closely connected in terms of phylogeny.
