= Dictyonema hapteriferum =

Scientific classification
- Kingdom: Fungi
- Division: Basidiomycota
- Class: Agaricomycetes
- Order: Agaricales
- Family: Hygrophoraceae
- Genus: Dictyonema
- Species: D. hapteriferum

Binomial name
- Dictyonema hapteriferum Lücking, Dal-Forno & Wilk (2013)
- Holotype: Madidi National Park, Bolivia

Species of lichen

Dictyonema hapteriferum is a species of lichen-forming fungus in the family Hygrophoraceae. It is a shelf‑forming basidiolichen—a lichen whose fungal partner belongs to the Basidiomycota rather than the more common Ascomycota—first described in 2013 from specinens collected in cloud forest habitats in the Andes. Its turquoise, filamentous thallus overgrows bark in thin, horizontal sheets whose underside carries minute, root‑like spore‑producing pads.

== Taxonomy ==
Dictyonema hapteriferum was described and named by Robert Lücking, Manuela Dal Forno and Karina Wilk in a revision of Neotropical basidiolichens. The holotype, collected by Wilk in Madidi National Park, La Paz Department, Bolivia, anchors the name. DNA sequences (ITS rDNA) confirm that the species belongs to a well‑supported lineage inside Dictyonema in the strict sense (sensu stricto) and is closely allied to, yet distinct from, the widespread D. sericeum.

== Description ==
In the field the lichen forms shallow, shelf‑like lobes up to a few centimeters long, stacked shingle‑style along the host trunk. The upper surface is a matt blue‑green felt created by numerous fibrils—hair‑like cyanobacterial threads ensheathed by fungal hyphae—lying more or less horizontally and only loosely interwoven. A faint whitish rim of pure fungal tissue (the prothallus) may outline the shelves.

Microscopically each fibril is 9–12 μm wide and contains scattered pale heterocysts, specialized cyanobacterial cells that fix nitrogen. The surrounding fungal sheath is made of jigsaw‑shaped cells typical for Dictyonema. From the lobe underside arise sparse, thin, hapter‑like hymenophore patches—tiny pads where the fungus forms its spore layer. These structures, only a few tenths of a millimeter across, inspired the species name (hapteriferum = "bearing hapteres"). No fully mature basidia or basidiospores were present in the type series.

== Habitat and distribution ==
The species inhabits humid lower‑montane cloud forest between roughly 2,000 and 2,300 m (6,600 and 7,500 ft) elevation. It grows as an epiphyte on the rough bark of living hardwoods and occasionally on hanging lianas, favoring persistently damp, shaded microsites. Verified collections come from Madidi National Park in Bolivia's La Paz Department, while additional specimens from neighboring Peru extend its range along the central Andes. D. hapteriferum is one of three Dictyonema species that have been documented from Bolivia.
