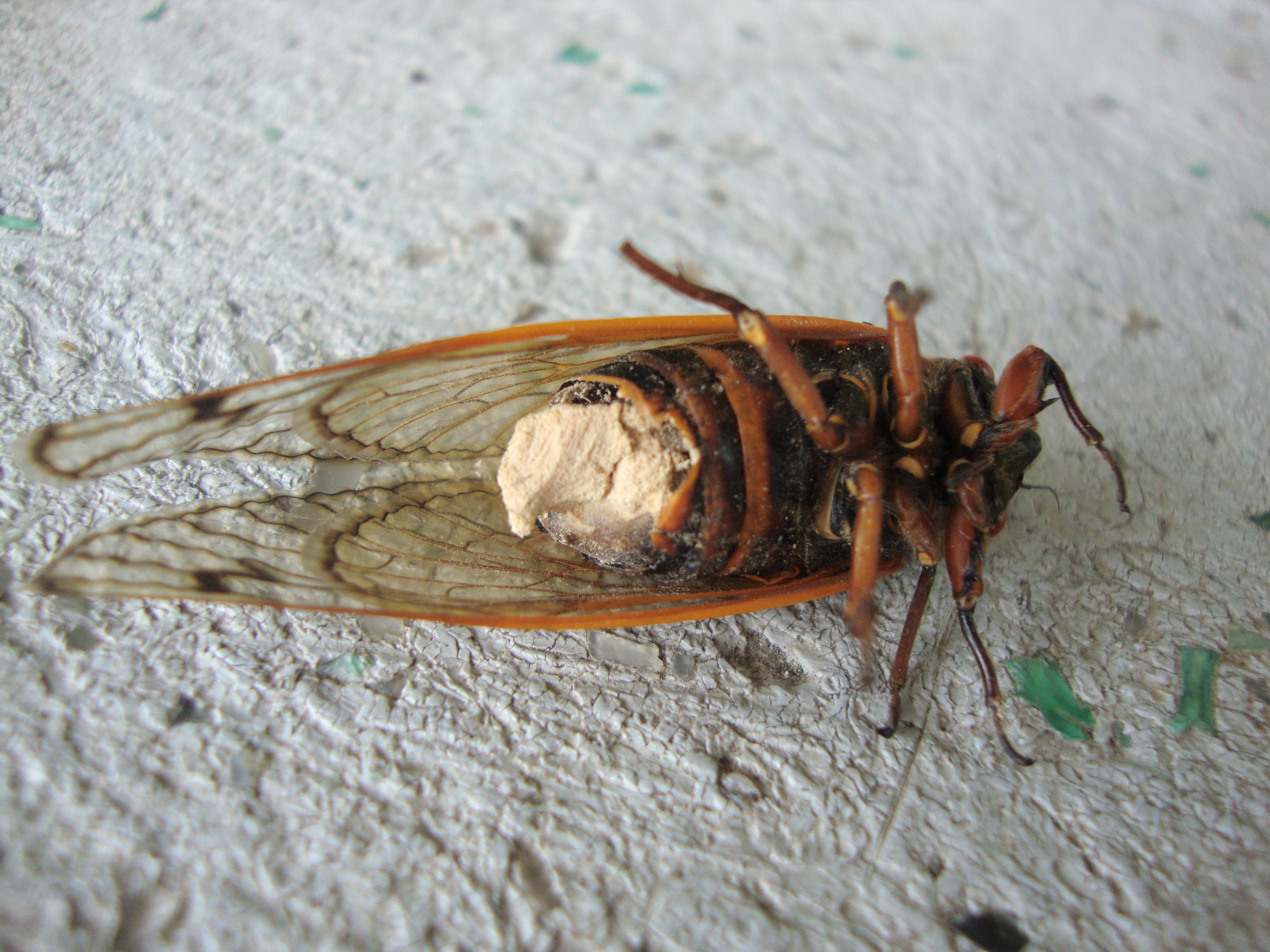
- Magicicada sp. infected with Massospora cicadina. Note the spore mass that has replaced the abdomen of the cicada.

Scientific classification
- Kingdom: Fungi
- Division: Entomophthoromycota
- Class: Entomophthoromycetes
- Order: Entomophthorales
- Family: Entomophthoraceae
- Genus: Massospora
- Species: M. cicadina

Binomial name
- Massospora cicadina Peck

= Massospora cicadina =

Species of fungus that infects periodical cicadas

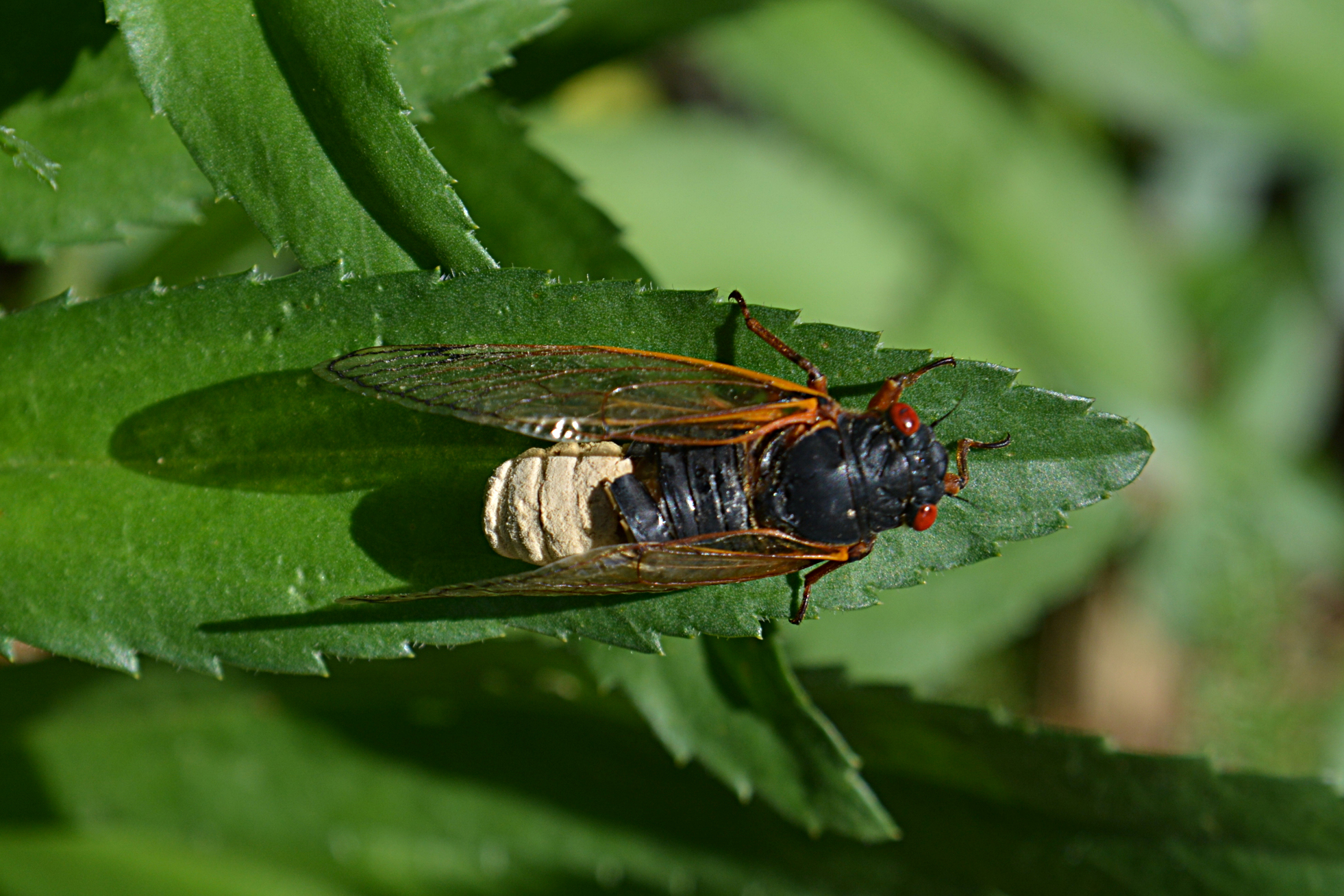
Cicada with extensive fungus on abdomen

Massospora cicadina is a fungal pathogen that infects only 13 and 17 year periodical cicadas. Infection results in a "plug" of spores that replaces the end of the cicada's abdomen while it is still alive, leading to infertility, disease transmission, and eventual death of the cicada.

== Systematics ==
M. cicadina belongs to the phylum Zoopagomycota, subphylum Entomophthoromycota, and order Entomophthorales. About a dozen other species of Massospora are known, each of which attacks a specific species of cicada.

== Discovery ==
In 1845, John H. B. Latrobe read a memoir of Benjamin Banneker at a meeting of the Maryland Historical Society. Latrobe reported that Banneker had in April 1800 described in his record book some of the characteristics of the periodical cicada, whose Brood X would soon begin emerging where he lived. In his description, Banneker wrote that the insects:

... begin to Sing or make a noise from first they come out of the Earth till they die. The hindermost part rots off, and it does not appear to be any pain to them, for they still continue on Singing till they die.

In 1851, Joseph Leidy described and illustrated the fungus that had apparently caused the abdominal "rot" that Banneker had observed. In 1879, Charles Horton Peck described the fungus and named it Massospora cicadina. Peck placed the fungus among the class Coniomycetes, but in 1888 Thaxter and Forbes placed it instead in Entomophthoraceae. It was not until 1921 that the pathogen's microscopic characteristics were thoroughly studied by Speare, who found that conidia germinate quickly when placed in a nutrient substance.

== Hosts ==
M. cicadina infects Magicicada species, which are 13- and 17-year periodical cicadas. Magicicada species spend most of their lives underground as nymphs, feeding on xylem fluids of tree roots. They dig upwards through the soil to molt into adults and emerge above ground after 13 or 17 years. Adult periodical cicadas live only for 4 to 6 weeks, to mate and deposit their eggs. Females attract males for mating by flicking their wings, while males produce a mating call. After mating, female cicadas deposit up to 600 or more eggs in V-shaped cuts on tree twigs (usually 20 eggs at a time in each cut).

== Life cycle ==
This image shows the confirmed and possible modes of transmission for cicadas infected with M. cicadina. Red lines represent an infected cicada, and black lines correspond to a healthy cicada. (Dashed lines show incubation periods for both the cicada and the fungus.) The question marks denote other possible routes of transmission.

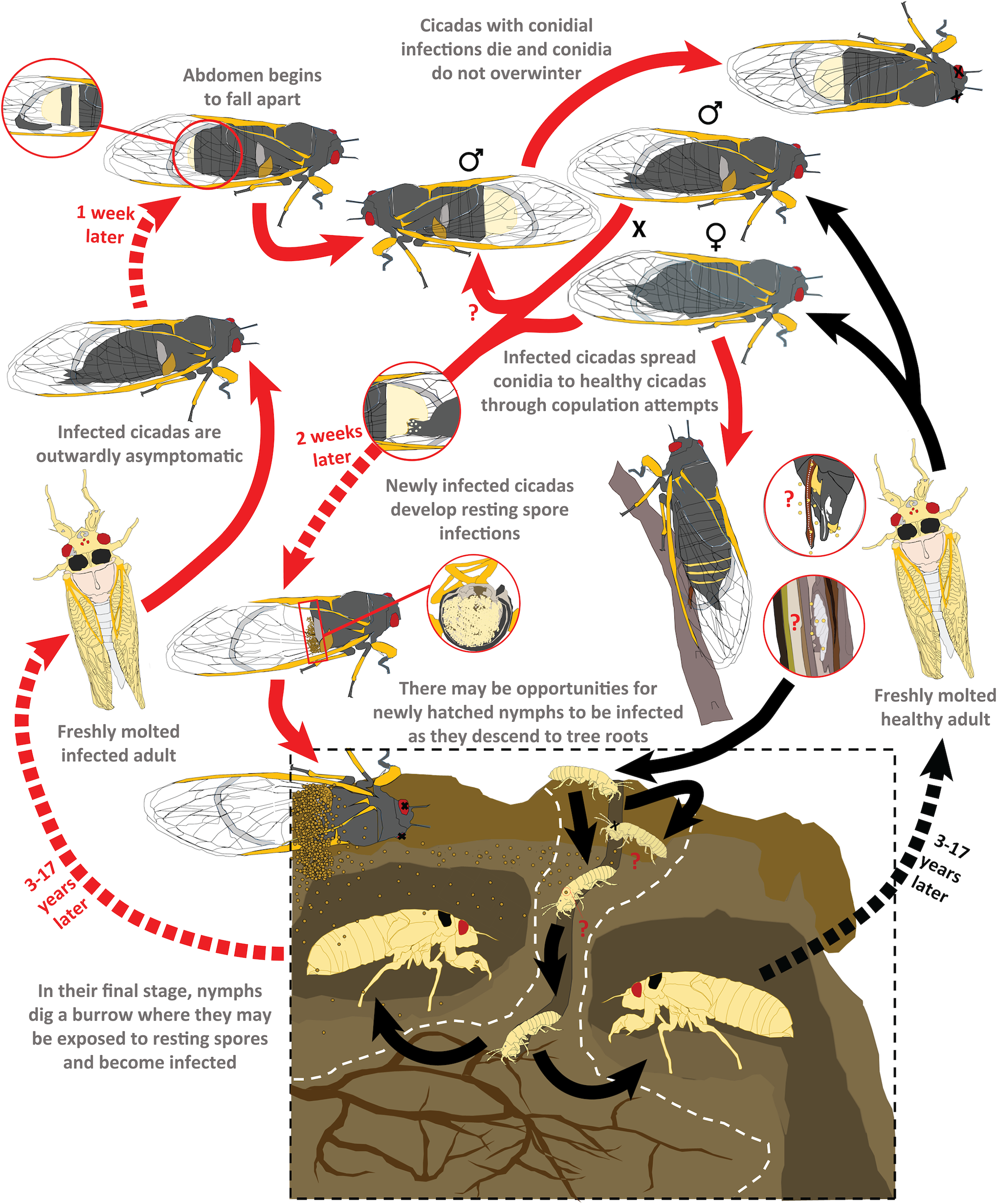

Spores of M. cicadina are capable of germinating and infecting cicadas at as little as one year but may remain dormant for either 13 or 17 years before becoming active. This synchronous cycle corresponds with local periods of cicada emergence. M. cicadina is thought to be the only pathogen that coincides with its host's 17-year life cycle; because of this it is considered to have the longest life cycle of any known fungus.

M. cicadina resting spores do not require a dormant period: they are capable of germinating and infecting periodical cicadas after less than a year from their introduction into soil. Cicadas are believed to become infected by fungal spores as the nymphs dig tunnels to the soil surface days before their emergence as adults.

== Infection ==
=== Stage I infection ===
The Initial infection takes place while cicada nymphs dig their way to the surface of the soil before emerging as adults. It is presumed that the emerging cicadas are infected by resting spores they encounter in the soil. In early stages of infection, hyphal bodies of the fungus are found in the host tissues. Later, Stage I infected adult cicadas produce haploid conidia, forming the asexual stage of the fungus. Conidia produced by Stage I infected cicadas are capable of infecting other adult cicadas.

There is no difference between the proportion of male to female nymphs being infected by spores in this stage. In the early stages of Stage I infection, the infection is completely concealed inside the abdomen of the cicada. Some time before the death of the host, the rear segments of the abdomen fall off, revealing a white, chalky mass or "plug" of the fungus, which produces spores. Because of this method of spreading of Stage I spores, cicadas infected with M. cicadina have been referred to as "flying salt shakers of death". Infected cicadas are infertile.

Stage I infected cicadas are observed to spend more time walking around and dragging their abdomen, which may aid in spreading conidia that infect other cicadas. This behavioral change is thought to be the result of a fungal extended phenotype, the physical afflictions of the infected cicadas, or the general phenology of cicada life cycles. Progression in male and female cicadas is similar, including the time elapsed before the abdominal segments fall off.

Stage I infected males respond to mating calls of both males and females and attract healthy males through flicking their wings, a behavior only observed in healthy females. This altered behavior aids in infection of healthy cicadas. Stage I infected males also tolerate mounting from courting males, suggesting that M. cicadina alters insect sexual behavior to increase infection rates. The fruiting bodies of M. cicadina on Stage I infected adult cicadas contain a substituted amphetamine alkaloid, cathinone.

=== Stage II infection ===
Cicadas that come into contact with conidia from an infected adult cicada contract Stage II infection. During Stage II infection, the fungus produces a different kind of spore: resting spores that have thick walls and are not directly infectious to adult cicadas. Instead, the resting spores lie dormant in soil and will infect the next generation of cicadas during their next 13 or 17 year emergence from the soil.

The fungus renders both males and females sterile, though the insect may remain alive and mobile while discharging spores. Infected cicadas display some normal behavior such as sexual responsiveness, and even copulation between infected and healthy cicadas has been observed. As cicada males form large chorus centers during mating, the infection rate of males with the resting spore stage is typically higher than infected females at this stage. Conidia that fill the abdomens of infected males at this stage also alter the pitch of their mating call, resulting in them sounding smaller than they actually are to females, which may also contribute to the prevalence of higher infection rates in males than in females.

== Habitat ==
Species of the genus Massospora are found in the same habitats as their host cicadas, which includes large temperate ranges in the Southern and Northern hemispheres.

== Potential applications ==
The density of cicadas over one 17-year cicada emergence period was found in one study to have dropped by one half due to infections from the fungus, while the number of infected cicadas producing resting spores increased by 9-fold. This suggests the fungus can be utilized as a control agent in decreasing the significant damage cicadas impose on young trees on which they lay their eggs. Studies of M. cicadina and its hosts can also provide insights into biological clocks and environmental signaling due to their long, synchronous life cycles.

== Similar host–parasite systems ==
- Another parasite that hijacks host sexual behavior is Massospora levispora, a pathogen of the annual cicada Okanagana rimosa.
- Ophiocordyceps sinensis is an entomopathogenic fungus (a fungus that grows on insects) in the family Ophiocordycipitaceae. It is mainly found in the meadows above 3,500 meters (11,500 ft) on the Tibetan Plateau in Southwest China and the Himalayan regions of Bhutan and Nepal. It parasitizes larvae of ghost moths and produces a fruiting body which used to be valued as a herbal remedy and in traditional Chinese medicine.
- Ophiocordyceps unilateralis infects ants of the tribe Camponotini, with the full pathogenesis being characterized by alteration of the behavioral patterns of the infected ant.
