= Dictyonema tricolor =

Scientific classification
- Kingdom: Fungi
- Division: Basidiomycota
- Class: Agaricomycetes
- Order: Agaricales
- Family: Hygrophoraceae
- Genus: Dictyonema
- Species: D. tricolor

Binomial name
- Dictyonema tricolor Lücking & Timdal (2016)

Species of lichen

Dictyonema tricolor is a species of basidiolichen in the family Hygrophoraceae. It is found in Tanzania, where it grows as an epiphyte on trees. The lichen was formally described as a new species by lichenologists Robert Lücking and Einar Timdal. The type specimen was collected by Norwegian Hildur Krog from a low montane rainforest in Lulandu Forest, (Iringa Urban District, Southern Highlands) at an elevation of 2,000 m (6,600 ft). The species epithet refers to the three-colours displayed where the regularly ascending tufts of blue-green cyanobacterial fibrils meet the brown or white colour in the apical part of the tufts.

Dictyonema tricolor is a member of the Dictyonema sericeum species complex, a group of species sharing similar overall morphology, including shelf-like, filamentous lobes.
