= Dictyonema album =

Scientific classification
- Kingdom: Fungi
- Division: Basidiomycota
- Class: Agaricomycetes
- Order: Agaricales
- Family: Hygrophoraceae
- Genus: Dictyonema
- Species: D. album

Binomial name
- Dictyonema album Lücking & Timdal (2016)

Species of lichen

Dictyonema album is a species of basidiolichen in the family Hygrophoraceae. It is found in Mauritius, where it grows as an epiphyte on shrubs.

== Taxonomy ==
The lichen was formally described as a new species by lichenologists Robert Lücking and Einar Timdal. The type specimen was collected from Mount Cocotte (Savanne District) at an elevation of 650 m (2,130 ft), where it was found growing on tree bark. The species epithet album ("white") refers to the whitish appearance of the thallus resulting from the preponderance of sterile, straight hyphae and lack of coloured cyanobacterial fibrils. It is a member of the Dictyonema sericeum species complex, a group of species sharing similar overall morphology, including shelf-like, filamentous lobes.

== Description ==
The thallus, or body, of Dictyonema album is filamentous and can take on a semi-circular shape, either adhering to projecting shelves or forming a crust on the substrate. The size of the thallus can reach up to 10 cm (4 in) in diameter, and it consists of multiple imbricate lobes, each measuring approximately 1 cm (0.4 in) in diameter.

Individual lobes of Dictyonema album are made up of loose, interwoven, aeruginous (greenish-blue) tufts of fibrils with long, white tips. When viewed from above, the thallus appears whitish in color. In cross-section, the thallus is about 1–2 mm thick, and the tufts of fibrils extend up to 5 mm from the base.

Dictyonema album lacks a distinct photobiont layer and medulla. Instead, the fibrils are connected to a white, loosely woven hypothallus at the base of the thallus. The tufts of fibrils are composed of densely arranged sterile, unbranched to sparsely branched hyphae that are arranged in parallel fashion. The hyphae are up to 0.5 mm thick and are intermingled with several (3–8) cyanobacterial fibrils, each with its own hyphal sheath. The hyphal sheath is colorless, measuring 14–16 μm in width and 2–3 μm in thickness.

The cyanobacterial filaments within the tufts are composed of greenish-blue cells, measuring 10–12 μm in width and 3–5 μm in height, and are penetrated by tubular fungal hyphae. Heterocytes, which are hyaline, measuring 8–10 μm in width and 4–6 μm in height, are frequent. The cells of the hyphal sheath are wavy in lateral outline, measuring 3–5 μm in diameter, and the hyphae of the hypothallus and those associated with fibrils or forming apical setae are straight and hyaline. The thickness of these hyphae ranges from 4–7 μm, and they lack clamp connections.
