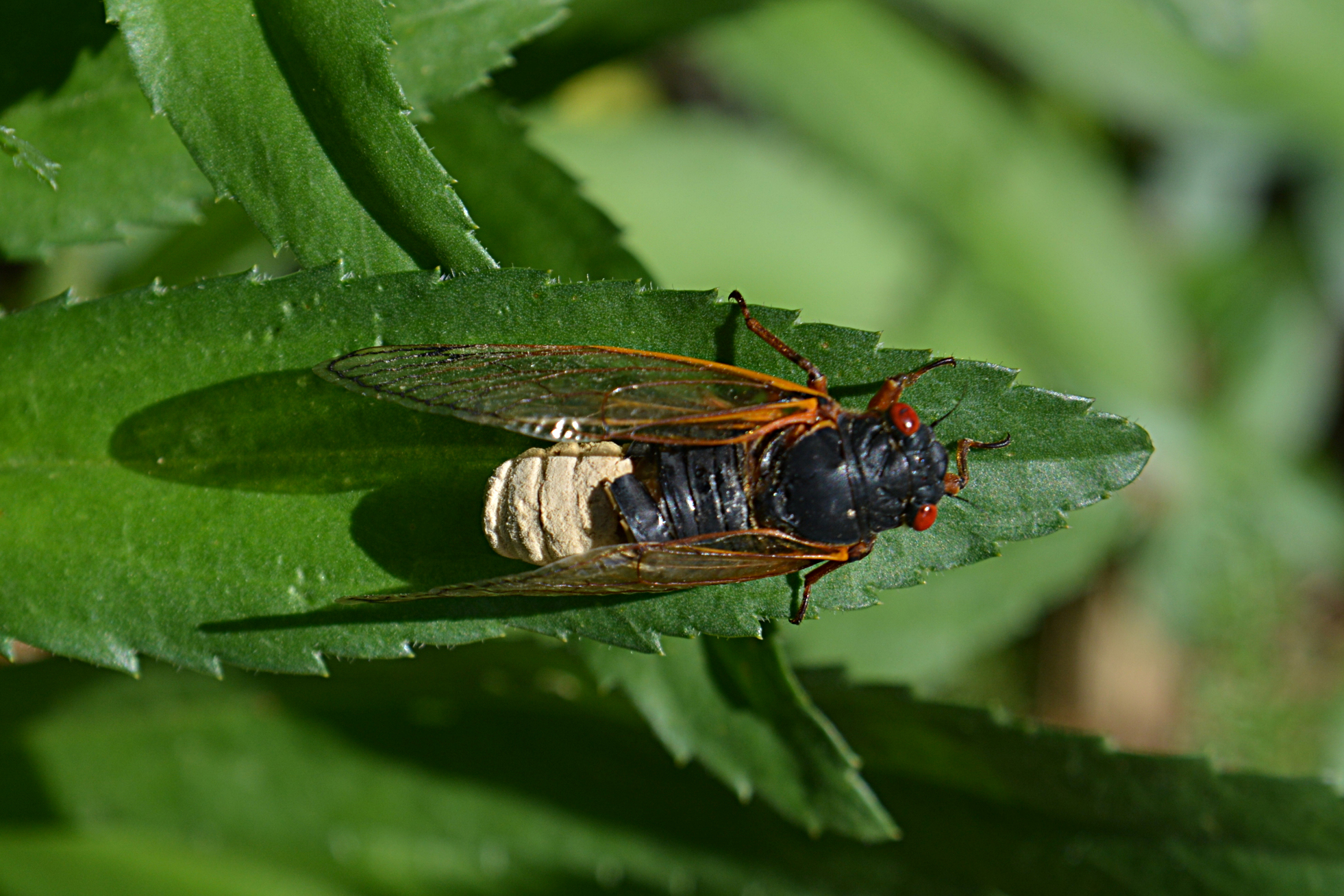
- Massospora cicadina

Scientific classification
- Kingdom: Fungi
- Division: Entomophthoromycota
- Class: Entomophthoromycetes
- Order: Entomophthorales
- Family: Entomophthoraceae
- Genus: Massospora; Peck, 1879

Type species
- Massospora cicadina Peck (1879)

= Massospora =

Genus of fungi

Massospora is a genus of fungi in the Entomophthoraceae family, within the order Entomophthorales of the Zygomycota. This has been supported by molecular phylogenetic analysis (Gryganskyi et al. 2012).

It includes more than a dozen obligate, sexually transmissible pathogenic species that infect (and kill) adult gregarious cicadas (Hemiptera) worldwide. At least two species are known to produce psychoactive compounds during infection: M. cicadina is known to produce cathinone; M. platypediae or M. levispora produces psilocybin.

Named in 1879 by the American botanist Charles Horton Peck (1833–1917).

The genus name of Massospora was derived from two words in the Greek, masso which means 'to grind' and spora for 'spore'. This then describes the complete disintegration of the host-insect's internal tissues eventually leading to a (described by the author as), "pulverulent mass of spores within" that can be seen after the terminal parts of the abdomen fall off.

== Species ==
As accepted by Species Fungorum:

- Massospora carinetae R.S. Soper (1974)
- Massospora cicadettae R.S. Soper (1981)
- Massospora cicadina Peck (1878)
- Massospora diceroproctae R.S. Soper (1974)
- Massospora diminuta R.S. Soper (1974)
- Massospora dorisianae R.S. Soper (1974)
- Massospora fidicinae R.S. Soper (1974)
- Massospora levispora R.S. Soper (1963)
- Massospora ocypetes R.S. Soper (1974)
- Massospora pahariae R.S. Soper (1981)
- Massospora platypediae R.S. Soper (1974)
- Massospora spinosa Cif., A.A. Machado & Vittal (1956)
- Massospora tettigatis R.S. Soper (1974)

Former species:

- M. agrotidis (Sorokīn) Jacz. & P.A. Jacz (1931) = Sorosporella agrotidis, Hypocreales family
- M. cleoni Wize (1904) = Entomophthora cleoni, Entomophthoraceae
- M. richteri Bres. & Staritz (1892) = Entomophthora richteri, Entomophthoraceae
- M. staritzii Bres. (1892) = Entomophthora staritzii, Entomophthoraceae
- M. tipulae J.P. Porter (1942) = Zoophthora porteri, Entomophthoraceae
- M. uvella (Krass.) Jacz. & P.A. Jacz (1931) = Sorosporella uvella, Hypocreales
