= Dictyonema obscuratum =

Scientific classification
- Kingdom: Fungi
- Division: Basidiomycota
- Class: Agaricomycetes
- Order: Agaricales
- Family: Hygrophoraceae
- Genus: Dictyonema
- Species: D. obscuratum

Binomial name
- Dictyonema obscuratum Lücking, A.A.Spielm. & Marcelli (2013)

Species of lichen

Dictyonema obscuratum is a species of basidiolichen in the family Hygrophoraceae. Originally discovered in Brazil and later recorded in Bolivia and Colombia, its cryptic, olive-green thallus sets it apart from similar species like Dictyonema phyllophilum and D. schenckianum.

== Taxonomy ==
The species was first described by lichenologists Robert Lücking, Adriano Spielmann, and Marcelo Marcelli. Its species name, obscuratum, reflects the very dark hue of the thallus, which can give the deceptive impression that the lichen is absent at first glance. The holotype of Dictyonema obscuratum was collected by the first author at an altitude of 635 m (2,083 ft) in Mogi-Guaçu Biological Reserve (São Paulo, Brazil) during a November 2007 expedition.

== Description ==
This lichen adheres to tree trunks, forming a compact layer of dark olive-green fibrils. Individual patches can reach up to 5 cm (2.0 in) across, but they often coalesce to cover larger areas. Underneath this layer is a thin, somewhat indistinct, sordid pale brown hypothallus.

The thallus, when viewed in cross-section, measures between 200 and 400 μm thick. This thickness is primarily composed of an upper photobiont layer and a lower medulla, forming the hypothallus. The cyanobacterial filaments that make up the photobiont layer are enclosed in a hyphal sheath, connected to loose hyphae towards the medulla. These dark green filaments can reach sizes of 20–25 μm wide and 6–8 μm high, often turning orange-yellow at the tips.

The basidiospores of D. obscuratum are ellipsoid to narrowly drop-shaped, hyaline, and measure 7–9 by 3–4 μm. Thin-layer chromatography did not reveal any substances present in D. obscuratum.

== Similar species ==
Dictyonema obscuratum belongs to the complex previously thought to be a single species, Dictyonema sericeum. It stands out from related species like D. phyllophilum and D. schenckianum due to its very dark thallus and its dark green, irregularly arranged fibrils. The cells of the cyanobacterial filaments in D. obscuratum often divide longitudinally, creating a unique 'muriform' appearance. This feature recalls D. moorei, but D. obscuratum lacks distinct separate filaments within a single sheath.

== Habitat and distribution ==
At the time of its publication, D. obscuratum had been found exclusively in the Cerrado (Cerrado denso) vegetation of São Paulo, Brazil. It is typically found growing on the corky bark of characteristic Cerrado trees. In 2014, it was recorded from Bolivia, and in 2015 from Colombia.
