= Acantholichen albomarginatus =

Scientific classification
- Kingdom: Fungi
- Division: Basidiomycota
- Class: Agaricomycetes
- Order: Agaricales
- Family: Hygrophoraceae
- Genus: Acantholichen
- Species: A. albomarginatus

Binomial name
- Acantholichen albomarginatus Dal-Forno, Marcelli & Lücking (2016)

Species of lichen-forming fungus

Acantholichen albomarginatus is a species of basidiolichen in the family Hygrophoraceae. Found in Brazil, it was formally described as a new species in 2016 by Manuela Dal-Forno, Marcelo Marcelli, and Robert Lücking. The type specimen was collected in Estrada das Prateleiras (Itatiaia National Park, Minas Gerais) at an elevation of 2,190 m (7,190 ft). Here, on the edge of a cloud forest in dense vegetation on the side on the road, it was found growing amongst bryophytes and liverworts. The specific epithet albomarginatus, which combines the Latin roots albo- ('white') and marginatus ('edge'), refers to the white margins that are on some of the squamules. The lichen is only known to occur at the type locality, which is part of the Atlantic Forest biome. The authors suggest that the species is easily overlooked, "because from a distance it looks like a mass of bluish gray hyphae resembling a non-lichenized cyanobacterium or just developing hyphae".
