= Acantholichen =

Scientific classification
- Kingdom: Fungi
- Division: Basidiomycota
- Class: Agaricomycetes
- Order: Agaricales
- Family: Hygrophoraceae
- Genus: Acantholichen; P.M.Jørg. (1998)

Type species
- Acantholichen pannarioides P.M.Jørg. (1998)

Species
- A. albomarginatus A. campestris A. galapagoensis A. pannarioides A. variabilis

Genus of lichens

Acantholichen is a genus of basidiolichen-forming fungus species in the family Hygrophoraceae. The genus was established in 1998 by the Per Magnus Jørgensen based on a single species from Costa Rica, but has since grown to include seven recognized species found across Central and South America. These lichens form crusts made of tiny, scale-like flaps that give them a finely granular appearance, quite different from the thread-like growth of their close relatives. Acantholichen species partner with blue-green bacteria to create their living structures, using specialized fungal pegs to exchange nutrients with their bacterial partners.

== Taxonomy ==
The genus was circumscribed by Norwegian lichenologist Per Magnus Jørgensen to contain the type, and at that time, only species, the basidiolichen Acantholichen pannarioides, discovered originally in Costa Rica in 1998. This species has a bluish, gelatinous thallus, and a fine, white powdery bloom covering the hairy upper surface; this surface is said to resemble "an unshaven chin". Five additional species, all basidiolichens, were added to the genus in 2016 following an in-depth analysis of specimens collected from the Galápagos, Costa Rica, Brazil and Colombia; a seventh species, from Venezuela, was added in 2022.

== Morphology and phylogeny ==
Acantholichen forms a microsquamulose thallus – a crust of tiny, scale-like flaps rather than loose threads – giving the lichen a finely granular look that contrasts with the filamentous webs of Dictyonema sensu stricto. Each squamule encloses the cyanobacterium Rhizonema, which is wrapped in a tight fungal sheath made of jigsaw-puzzle-shaped cells; these cells develop short haustoria (minute pegs that penetrate the algal partner to exchange nutrients) that, in Acantholichen, form an orbicular "sleeve" around irregular packets of photobiont cells. The genus shares this sheath-and-haustorium machinery with Cora and Corella, whereas the earlier-diverging Cyphellostereum lacks both features; the absence of haustoria there explains why its cyanobacterial filaments stay narrow, while those in Acantholichen appear swollen where the fungal pegs intrude. A three-gene phylogeny recovers five major basidiolichen lineages in the family Hygrophoraceae and places Acantholichen in a well-supported clade with Corella; together they are sister to the foliose Cora, while Dictyonema (in the strict sense) forms a paraphyletic grade below them and Cyphellostereum branches off first. Character-state reconstructions indicate that Acantholichen and Corella are ecorticate (they lack the protective cortex found in many lichens), whereas Cora evolved a true cortex independently, highlighting repeated innovation in thallus architecture within the group.

== Species ==
- Acantholichen albomarginatus Dal-Forno, Marcelli & Lücking (2016) – Brazil
- Acantholichen campestris Dal-Forno, A.A.Spielm. & Lücking (2016) – Brazil
- Acantholichen dendroideus V.Marcano (2022) – Venezuela
- Acantholichen galapagoensis Dal-Forno, Bungartz & Lücking (2016) – Galápagos Islands
- Acantholichen pannarioides P.M.Jørg. (1998) – Central America and northern South America
- Acantholichen sorediatus Dal-Forno, Sipman & Lücking (2016) – Costa Rica
- Acantholichen variabilis Dal-Forno, Coca & Lücking (2016) – Colombia

== See also ==
- List of Agaricales genera
