= Edrudia =

Scientific classification
- Domain: Eukaryota
- Kingdom: Fungi
- Division: Ascomycota
- Class: Lecanoromycetes
- Order: Lecanorales
- Family: Lecanoraceae
- Genus: Edrudia; W.P.Jord. (1980)

Type species
- Edrudia constipans (Nyl.) W.P.Jord. (1980)

Genus of fungi

Edrudia is a fungal genus in the family Lecanoraceae. It is a monotypic genus, containing the single species Edrudia constipans, which is a lichen endemic to the Farallon Islands of California. The genus is named after American botanist and lichenologist Emanuel David Rudolph.
