= Emanuel David Rudolph =

American botanist, lichenologist and science historian (1927–1992)

- Born: September 9, 1927
- Died: June 22, 1992 (aged 64)
- Education: Brooklyn College; Hunter College; New York University
- Alma mater: Washington University
- Known for: lichenology of Arctic and Antarctic regions; effects of stress on lichens; history of botany
- Scientific career
- Fields: lichenology
- Institutions: Wellesley College; Ohio State University
- Thesis: Revisionary Studies in the Lichen Family Blasteniaceae in North America North of Mexico
- Doctoral advisors: Carroll William Dodge
- Doctoral students: James D. Lawrey
- Author abbrev. (botany): E.D.Rudolph

Emanuel David "Rudy" Rudolph (9 September 1927, Brooklyn – 22 June 1992, Columbus, Ohio) was a botanist, lichenologist, and historian of botany. He was "the first botanist to conduct diverse experiments on the total biology of lichens in both polar regions".

== Biography ==
After graduating from Brooklyn's Erasmus Hall High School in 1945, Emanuel D. Rudolph served in the U.S. Army from 1945 to 1946. He studied in 1947 at Brooklyn College, from 1948 to 1950 at Hunter College, and in 1945 and again from 1947 to 1950 at New York University, where he graduated in 1950 with a bachelor's degree in biology. From 1950 to 1951 he was a docent at the Brooklyn Children's Museum. In 1951 he matriculated at Washington University in St. Louis and graduated there in 1955 with a Ph.D. in botany. His thesis, written under the supervision of Carroll William Dodge, is entitled Revisionary Studies in the Lichen Family Blasteniaceae in North America North of Mexico. At Wellesley College he was an instructor from 1955 to 1959 and an assistant professor from 1959 to 1961. In Ohio State University's Department of Botany and Plant Pathology, he was from 1961 to 1964 an assistant professor, from 1964 to 1969 an associate professor, from 1969 to 1989 a full professor, and from 1990 to 1992 professor emeritus. From 1978 to 1987 he chaired the department of botany. He supervised the doctoral dissertations of 4 Ph.D. students and taught courses in "general biology, general botany, lichenology, mycology, history of botany, and history of biology." He published 195 book reviews.

At scientific meetings or in special lectures, he presented over 100 papers. He was the author or coauthor of over 350 articles, "of which about half were in the history of botany."

In 1962 Rudolph joined the Ohio Academy of Science (founded in 1891) and served the Academy in several capacities — when he unexpectedly died in June 1992 he was the Academy's president-elect (as of April 1992). He was from 1974 to 1980 an associate editor for the Academy's Ohio Journal of Science and served as its book review editor from 1965 to 1974. At annual meetings of the Academy, he presented many "research papers on polar biology, lichenology, and the history of biology and botany."

He was elected in 1959 a fellow in the American Association for the Advancement of Science, in 1965 a fellow of the Ohio Academy of Science, and in 1974 a fellow of the Linnean Society of London. In 1965 the Rudolph Glacier in northern Victoria Land, Antarctica, was named in his honor. In 1969 he received the United States Antarctica Service Medal. He was honored in 1955 by the naming of the Antarctican lichen species genus Catillaria rudolphi and in 1980 by the naming of the Farallon Islands lichen genus Edrudia.

Rudolph and his wife joined the Ohio Academy of Science. She predeceased him. They collected a personal library of over 53,000 scientific and technical books, which was donated to Ohio State University (OSU) after his death. He bequeathed his collection of 7,000 botanical prints to OSU's Chadwick Arboretum & Learning Gardens. When he died in a traffic accident, his donated kidneys enabled two people to continue living.

== Selected publications ==
=== Articles ===
- Rudolph, Emanuel D. (1953). "A Contribution to the Lichen Flora of Arizona and New Mexico". Annals of the Missouri Botanical Garden. 40 (2): 63–72. Bibcode:1953AnMBG..40...63R. doi:10.2307/2394620. JSTOR 2394620.
- Rudolph, Emanuel D. (1963). "Vegetation on Hallett Station Area, Victoria Land, Antarctica". Ecology. 44 (3): 585–586. Bibcode:1963Ecol...44..585R. doi:10.2307/1932542. JSTOR 1932542. (See Hallett Station.)
- Rudolph, E. D. (1965). "Antarctic Lichens and Vascular Plants: Their Significance". BioScience. 15 (4): 285–287. doi:10.2307/1293425. JSTOR 1293425.
- Rudolph, Emanuel D.; Giesy, Robert M. (1966). "Electron Microscope Studies of Lichen Reproductive Structures in Physcia aipolia". Mycologia. 58 (5): 786–796. doi:10.1080/00275514.1966.12018370. PMID 5976684.
- Showman, Ray E.; Rudolph, Emanuel D. (1971). "Water Relations in Living, Dead, and Cellulose Models of the Lichen Umbilicaria papulosa". The Bryologist. 74 (4): 444–450. doi:10.2307/3241303. JSTOR 3241303. (Umbilicaria papulosa is a homotypic synonym for Lasallia papulosa.)
- Rudolph, E. D. (1973). "Botany in American and British chapbooks before 1860". Plant Science Bulletin. 19 (3). Botanical Society of America: 34–35. (See chapbook.)
- Williams, Michael E.; Rudolph, Emanuel D. (1974). "The Role of Lichens and Associated Fungi in the Chemical Weathering of Rock". Mycologia. 66 (4): 648–660. doi:10.1080/00275514.1974.12019656.
- Lawrey, James D.; Rudolph, E. D. (May 1975). "Lichen accumulation of some heavy metals from acidic surface substrates of coal mine ecosystems in Southeastern Ohio" (PDF). The Ohio Journal of Science. 75 (3): 113–117.
- Williams, M.E.; Rudolph, E.D.; Schofield, E.A.; Prasher, D.C. (1978). "The Role of Lichens in the Structure, Productivity, and Mineral Cycling of the Wet Coastal Alaskan Tundra". In Tieszen, L.L. (ed.). Vegetation and Production Ecology of an Alaskan Arctic Tundra. Ecological Studies (Analysis and Synthesis). Vol. 29. New York, NY: Springer. pp. 185–206. doi:10.1007/978-1-4612-6307-4_7. ISBN 978-1-4612-6309-8.
- Rudolph, Emanuel D. (1982). "Women in Nineteenth Century American Botany; A Generally Unrecognized Constituency". American Journal of Botany. 69 (8): 1346–1355. Bibcode:1982AmJB...69.1346R. doi:10.1002/j.1537-2197.1982.tb13382.x. ISSN 0002-9122. JSTOR 2442761.
- Rudolph, Emanuel D. (1982). "The introduction of the Natural System of classification of plants to nineteenth century American students". Archives of Natural History. 10 (3): 461–468. doi:10.3366/anh.1982.10.3.461. PMID 11615993.
- Rudolph, Emanuel D. (1984). "Almira Hart Lincoln Phelps (1793–1884) and the Spread of Botany in Nineteenth Century America". American Journal of Botany. 71 (8): 1161–1167. Bibcode:1984AmJB...71.1161R. doi:10.1002/j.1537-2197.1984.tb11969.x. (See Almira Hart Lincoln Phelps.)
- Rudolph, Emanuel D. (1996). "INVITED SPECIAL PAPER: History of the botanical teaching laboratory in the United States". American Journal of Botany. 83 (5): 661–671. Bibcode:1996AmJB...83..661R. doi:10.1002/j.1537-2197.1996.tb12752.x.

=== Books ===
- Rudolph, Emanuel David (2000). Stuckey, Ronald L.; Burk, William R. (eds.). Emanuel D. Rudolph's Studies in the History of North American Botany: With an Appendix, Relationships Between Science and Religion. Botanical Research Institute of Texas. ISBN 9781889878058; 30 of Rudolph's "mostly unpublished papers on the history of North American Botany"
