= Parmotrema lawreyi =

Scientific classification
- Domain: Eukaryota
- Kingdom: Fungi
- Division: Ascomycota
- Class: Lecanoromycetes
- Order: Lecanorales
- Family: Parmeliaceae
- Genus: Parmotrema
- Species: P. lawreyi

Binomial name
- Parmotrema lawreyi Bungartz & Spielmann (2019)

Species of lichen

Parmotrema lawreyi is a species of corticolous (bark-dwelling), foliose lichen in the family Parmeliaceae. Found on the Galápagos Islands, it was formally described as a new species in 2019 by lichenologists Frank Bungartz and Adriano Spielmann. The type specimen was collected by the first author from the foothills of Media Luna on San Cristóbal Island, where it was found in dry, open woodland growing on the trunk of Bursera graveolens. The species epithet honours the authors' colleague James D. Lawrey, "on the occasion of his 70th birthday".

== Description ==
The upper thallus surface of Parmotrema lawreyi is a pale greenish-yellow color and appears dull, smooth, and not wrinkled, with occasional cracks but not forming a distinctly net-like pattern. The lichen has pustules that develop into isidia, which can vary in shape from initially cylindrical to dactyliform and sometimes flattened or squamulose-lobulate. With age, the isidia become increasingly branched and can develop into a coralloid or cauliflower-shaped structure that ruptures into coarse, granular, pseudocorticate soredia.

The lobes of Parmotrema lawreyi are moderate-sized, rotund, and have incised axils. The margins of the lobes are usually smooth, without cilia, but may rarely have a few cilia. The lower surface of the lichen has a deep brown margin that is about 1–2.5 mm wide and is moderately to densely rhizinate, meaning it has short, stout, black rhizines that can be simple or sparsely branched. The medulla (the tissue inside the lichen) is white. Apothecia and pycnidia, which are reproductive structures, were not observed in this species.

The cortex contains both atranorin and usnic acid, while the medulla has protocetraric acid. The expected results of standard chemical spot tests in the cortex are P+ (yellow),K+ (yellow), KC−, C−, UV−; and in the medulla P+ (yellow turning orange), K+ (yellowish brown), KC−, C−, UV−.

== See also ==
- List of Parmotrema species
