= Dictyonema discocarpum =

Scientific classification
- Kingdom: Fungi
- Division: Basidiomycota
- Class: Agaricomycetes
- Order: Agaricales
- Family: Hygrophoraceae
- Genus: Dictyonema
- Species: D. discocarpum

Binomial name
- Dictyonema discocarpum Lücking, Dal-Forno & Wilk (2013)
- Holotype: Madidi National Park, Bolivia

Species of lichen

Dictyonema discocarpum is a species of lichen-forming fungus in the family Hygrophoraceae. It is a filamentous, blue‑green basidiolichen (a lichen whose fungal partner is a basidiomycete) that grows in thin, shelf‑like mats on tree bark in Bolivian cloud forest. Described in 2013, it is one of three Dictyonema species discovered together in the same Andean reserve and is readily recognized by the tiny, white "pin‑head" discs that speckle the underside of each shelf.

== Taxonomy ==
The species was named by Robert Lücking, Manuela Dal Forno and Karina Wilk from material collected in Madidi National Park, La Paz Department, Bolivia, at about 2,200 m (7,200 ft) elevation. The specific epithet discocarpum ("bearing discs") refers to its round fruiting patches. DNA sequencing of the internal transcribed spacer (ITS) region places the fungus within Dictyonema in the strict sense (sensu stricto), closely related to the widespread D. sericeum but forming its own clade. Like D. sericeum it forms shelf‑like lobes, yet only D. discocarpum produces neatly rounded, crisp‑edged hymenophores ("disc‑shaped" basidiocarps) on the lower surface.

== Description ==
The lichen starts as a felted turquoise crust that soon lifts at the margin to form narrow, horizontal shelves (up to 3 cm long, 1–2 mm thick). These overlap shingle‑style along the host trunk. Each shelf is composed of countless cyanobacterial threads (fibrils) lying roughly parallel to the substrate. The fungus envelops each thread with jigsaw‑shaped cortical cells typical of Dictyonema, creating a tough outer rind only 40–60 μm thick. On the underside, the lichen develops minute, snow‑white pads 0.2–0.6 mm across. These pads are hymenophores—the spore‑producing surface of the basidiomycete. In D. discocarpum they are distinctly disc‑shaped, explaining the species name and separating it from the irregular, shelf‑edge patches seen in relatives.

== Habitat and distribution ==
At the time of its original publication, D. discocarpum was confirmed to occur only in north‑western Bolivia (La Paz Department). The lichen grows epiphytically on rough bark and on trailing lianas in lower montane cloud forest (about 1,800–2,300 m elevation). The site is persistently humid, with frequent fog and dense bryophyte cover.
