= Dictyonema aeruginosulum =

Scientific classification
- Domain: Eukaryota
- Kingdom: Fungi
- Division: Basidiomycota
- Class: Agaricomycetes
- Order: Agaricales
- Family: Hygrophoraceae
- Genus: Dictyonema
- Species: D. aeruginosulum

Binomial name
- Dictyonema aeruginosulum Lücking, Nelsen & Will-Wolf (2013)

Species of lichen

Dictyonema aeruginosulum is a species of basidiolichen in the family Hygrophoraceae. Characteristics of the lichen include its distinctive finger-like projections and blue-green hue. It is distinguishable from its closest relatives by its unique morphology and the absence of clamp connections in its structure. Dictyonema aeruginosulum is an epiphyte, forming thick mats on tree trunks within rainforest regions. The species was first identified in Costa Rica's Tenorio Volcano National Park, and it has only been recorded from this location.

== Taxonomy ==
Dictyonema aeruginosulum was scientifically described by Robert Lücking, Matthew Nelsen, and Susan Will-Wolf in 2013. The species name aeruginosulum alludes to the lichen's characteristically blue-green colour, which distinguishes this lichen from others in the genus Dictyonema that typically exhibit more blue or green hues. The holotype specimen was collected by the second author in Costa Rica's Tenorio Volcano National Park in 2004, at an altitude of 700 m (2,300 ft). Molecular analysis suggests a sister taxon relationship with Dictyonema schenkianum.

== Description ==
Dictyonema aeruginosulum forms a thick mat on tree trunks, with a complex structure consisting of blue-green cyanobacterial filaments wrapped in a network of fungal hyphae. Its defining feature is a series of coarse, irregular, finger-like projections covered with fibrils that emerge from the thallus, reaching up to 10 mm in height.

Notably, this lichen lacks clamp connections, a feature that helps distinguish it from the morphologically similar species Dictyonema irpicinum. Its hyphal sheath cells are wavy in lateral outline, and heterocytes – a special type of cyanobacterial cell – are sparse and pale yellow. The photobiont partner of the lichen is a member of Rhizonema, a genus of filamentous cyanobacteria in family Nostocaceae.

Its hymenophore forms irregular patches on the thallus surface or underside of the projections. The hymenium includes numerous basidioles and scattered basidia, with ellipsoid to narrowly drop-shaped, hyaline (translucent) basidiospores observed.

== Similar species ==
As one of several species separated from the broad concept of D. sericeum, Dictyonema aeruginosulum shows that variation in thallus morphology can hold taxonomic value. It is most similar to D. phyllophilum due to its distinct white hypothallus, but stands apart primarily through its conspicuous finger-like projections. Phylogenetically, it does not seem to be closely related to D. phyllophilum.

Similar finger-like projections can be observed in D. scabridum and D. irpicinum, but these species differ through their shelf-like growth and presence of clamp connections. Furthermore, D. scabridum shows an almost compact surface due to densely arranged fibrils.

== Habitat and distribution ==
Dictyonema aeruginosulum has been found in the lower montane cloud forest zone of Costa Rica's northern Cordillera de Tilarán, specifically within the Tenorio Volcano National Park. The lichen forms extensive mats on the trunks of semi-exposed trees, particularly Syzygium jambos, in a pasture along the road in an area abundant with rainfall. However, due to extensive logging activities in the region, the original holotype population is likely to have been extirpated.
