= Massospora levispora =

Scientific classification
- Kingdom: Fungi
- Division: Entomophthoromycota
- Class: Entomophthoromycetes
- Order: Entomophthorales
- Family: Entomophthoraceae
- Genus: Massospora
- Species: M. levispora

Binomial name
- Massospora levispora R.S.Soper

Species of fungus

Massospora levispora, which is likely the same species as Massospora platypediae, is a fungus of the genus Massospora. It is an entomopathogen, or insect pathogen, specifically of cicadas. The fungus is known to produce psilocybin. It is one of few known non mushroom producing fungi known to produce psilocybin. Another such fungus may be the lichen Dictyonema huaorani, but this is said to be insufficiently confirmed.
