= Dictyonema =

Scientific classification
- Kingdom: Fungi
- Division: Basidiomycota
- Class: Agaricomycetes
- Order: Agaricales
- Family: Hygrophoraceae
- Genus: Dictyonema; C.Agardh ex Kunth (1822)

Type species
- Dictyonema excentricum C.Agardh (1822)

Genus of lichens

Dictyonema is a genus of mainly tropical basidiolichens in the family Hygrophoraceae. Unlike most lichens, which contain fungi related to yeasts and molds, Dictyonema species contain fungi more closely related to mushrooms. The genus includes about 40 recognized species found mainly in tropical regions, ranging from lowland forests to high mountain elevations up to 4,300 meters in the Andes. These lichens come in various forms, from crusty patches to leaf-like structures to thread-like mats, and most grow on soil, rocks, moss, or rotting logs. One species from the Amazon rainforest has traditional use by indigenous peoples as a hallucinogenic substance in shamanic rituals.

== The Dictyonema symbiosis ==
Most lichens are a symbiosis between an ascomycete fungus and a photosynthetic green alga. However, a small percentage of lichens (approximately 10%) are cyanolichens and contain a photosynthetic cyanobacterium instead of green algae, and an even smaller number (less than 1%) are basidiolichens and contain a basidiomycete fungus instead of an ascomycete. This makes Dictyonema more closely related to mushroom-forming fungi than it is to most other lichens.

== Taxonomy ==
The genus Dictyonema was circumscribed in 1822 by Carl Agardh and Carl Kunth after examining a novel fungus that was sent to them from Brazil. The genus was redefined in 1978 when Erast Parmasto assessed 40 different species of basidiolichens that were previously divided into 3 families and 8 genera (including Cora, Dichonema, Laudatea, Rhipidonema, and Thelephora), and reduced them to 5 species in the single genus Dictyonema. This resulted in a rather diverse group of lichens that grew in size to more than 20 species. There was, however, some debate over whether or not all of these species should be included in the same genus.

== Species ==
As of October 2024, Species Fungorum (in the Catalogue of Life) accept 38 species in Dictyonema.

- Dictyonema aeruginosulum Lücking, Nelsen & Will-Wolf (2013)
- Dictyonema album Lücking & Timdal (2016) – Africa
- Dictyonema andinum V.Marcano (2022)
- Dictyonema applanatum Lücking, Dal-Forno & Wilk (2013) – Bolivia
- Dictyonema barbatum Dal-Forno, Bungartz & Lücking (2017) – Galápagos Islands
- Dictyonema caespitosum (Johow) Lücking (2013)
- Dictyonema coppinsii Lücking, Barrie & Genney (2014) – Europe
- Dictyonema darwinianum Dal-Forno, Bungartz & Lücking (2017) – Galápagos Islands
- Dictyonema diducens Nyl. ex Lücking (2013)
- Dictyonema discocarpum Lücking, Dal-Forno & Wilk (2013) – Bolivia
- Dictyonema duidense V.Marcano (2022)
- Dictyonema giganteum L.Y.Vargas, Moncada & Lücking (2014) – Colombia
- Dictyonema gomezianum Lücking, Dal-Forno & Lawrey (2015)
- Dictyonema guadalupense (Rabenh. ex Sacc.) Zahlbr. (1908)
- Dictyonema hapteriferum Lücking, Dal-Forno & Wilk (2013) – Bolivia
- Dictyonema hernandezii Lücking, Lawrey & Dal-Forno (2011)
- Dictyonema huaorani Dal-Forno, Schmull, Lücking & Lawrey (2014)
- Dictyonema irpicinum Mont. (1848)
- Dictyonema irrigatum (Berk. & M.A.Curtis) Lücking (2013)
- Dictyonema krogiae Lücking & Timdal (2016) – Africa
- Dictyonema laurae V.Marcano (2022)
- Dictyonema lawreyi Dal Forno, Kaminsky & Lücking (2019)
- Dictyonema ligulatum (Kremp.) Zahlbr. (1908)
- Dictyonema metallicum Lücking, Dal-Forno & Lawrey (2013)
- Dictyonema moorei (Nyl.) Henssen (1963)
- Dictyonema obscuratum Lücking, A.A.Spielm. & Marcelli (2013)
- Dictyonema pectinatum Dal-Forno, Yánez & Lücking (2012) – Galápagos Islands
- Dictyonema phyllophilum (Parmasto) Lücking, Dal-Forno & Lawrey (2013)
- Dictyonema ramificans Dal-Forno, Yánez-Ayabaca & Lücking (2017) – Galápagos Islands
- Dictyonema reticulatum (Berk.) Zahlbr. (1931)
- Dictyonema scabridum (Vain.) Lücking (2013)
- Dictyonema subinvolutum V.Marcano (2022)
- Dictyonema subobscuratum Dal-Forno, Bungartz & Lücking (2017) – Galápagos Islands
- Dictyonema subsericeum V.Marcano (2022)
- Dictyonema thelephora (Spreng.) Zahlbr. (1931)
- Dictyonema tricolor Lücking & Timdal (2016) – Africa
- Dictyonema umbricola V.Marcano (2022)
- Dictyonema yunnanum D.Liu, X.Y.Wang & Li S.Wang (2018) – China

== Morphology and ecology ==
Dictyonema is a diverse group of lichens. There are species of a variety of different shapes, including foliose, crustose, and filamentous. Most species grow on soil, rock, moss, or rotting logs, but one species grows on the leaves of trees. Although species of Dictyonema are mainly tropical, they range from the tropical lowlands to an elevation of 4,300 m (14,100 ft) in the Andes.

== Evolutionary relationships and lichenization ==
The Dictyonema fungus is a basidiomycete, so it developed lichenization independently from the ascomycete lichens. Within the basidiomycetes, Dictyonema is closely related to three other genera of basidiolichens that are also in the family Hygrophoraceae: Lichenomphalia, Acantholichen, and Cyphellostereum. The molecular data indicates that lichenization has evolved independently at least twice, and perhaps three times, within these four genera, which suggests that for some reason the fungi in Hygrophoraceae are predisposed to evolve into lichens. The majority of the other, non-lichenized fungi in this family are saprotrophic (consuming decaying organic matter) or ectomycorrhizal (symbiotic with plant roots), although numerous species, such as Arrhenia, grow on mosses and derive nutrition from them. It is not yet understood why these fungi are more inclined to become lichens.

Multilocus phylogenetics analyses split Dictyonema sensu lato into five strongly supported genera—the basal Cyphellostereum, a paraphyletic Dictyonema sensu stricto, and the successively derived Acantholichen, Corella and Cora. These same trees place Cyphellostereum as the earliest-diverging lineage, underpinning all later morphological innovations within the clade. Ancestral-state reconstructions show a stepwise elaboration of the lichen body: from simple filamentous crusts with separate cyphelloid basidiocarps (Cyphellostereum), through filamentous mats whose stereoide-corticioid basidiocarps are partly embedded (Dictyonema s.str.), to microsquamulose (Acantholichen) and finally foliose or macrosquamulose thalli in which corticioid basidiocarps are fully supported by the lichen tissue (Corella + Cora).

This morphological gradient is tightly correlated with phylogeny: thalli become progressively more complex the further a species lies from the root of the tree. The authors interpret the pattern as evidence that basidiolichen thalli in this group evolved by gradual incorporation of ancestral reproductive (basidiocarp) tissue into the vegetative symbiosis, rather than sprouting de novo from undifferentiated mycelium. All five genera partner with the same Rhizonema cyanobacterium and, except for Cyphellostereum, share a distinctive "jigsaw-puzzle" haustorial sheath—suggesting a single origin of the cyanobacterial symbiosis followed by internal diversification. Extant non-lichenised relatives in the agaricoid genus Arrhenia provide a living model for the ancestral condition, making the Dictyonema complex a prime example of how lichenization has arisen relatively recently within Basidiomycota.

== Traditional use ==
An unidentified species of Dictyonema is called nenendape by the Huaorani people of Amazon jungle of Ecuador. An infusion made with this lichen is said to cause intense hallucinations, and it is used by the shaman to call upon malevolent spirits to curse people. It is also used to cause sterility.

== See also ==
- List of Agaricales genera
