= James D. Lawrey =

American lichenologist (born 1949)

James Donald Lawrey
- Born: December 15, 1949; Arlington, Virginia, US
- Education: University of South Dakota
- Alma mater: Ohio State University
- Awards: Acharius Medal
- Scientific career
- Fields: lichenology
- Institutions: George Mason University, US
- Doctoral advisors: Emanuel Rudolph
- Author abbrev. (botany): Lawrey

James Donald Lawrey is a biologist, specializing in lichens. He is known for leading long-term monitoring projects, taxonomy and studies of the evolution of the fungi in lichens.

== Early life and education ==
After growing up in Rockville, Maryland, James (Jim) Donald Lawrey attended Wake Forest University (B.S. in Biology, 1971) and the University of South Dakota (M.A. in biology, 1973). He gained his doctorate from Ohio State University in 1977 working on the plant, lichen and fungal communities in an abandoned coal mine, supervised by Emanuel Rudolph.

== Career ==
After the award of his doctorate in 1977, he was immediately employed by George Mason University and was promoted to full professor in 1993 where he remained throughout his career.

The focus of his research is fungal diversity and ecology and he particularly makes use of molecular phylogenetics, utilising DNA sequencing to identify fungi and assesses relationships between species. He is especially interested in the evolution of lichens and the fungi that form part of them. His work has provided new insight into the basidiolichens, focusing on the Dictyonema clade. From the 1970s he has been part of programs to monitor lichens in natural environments, initially collaborating with Mason Hale on a long-term program at Plummers Island in the Potomac River, Maryland and then working with the National Park Service at other sites within their remit. During the 1990s he worked extensively on the role of the secondary metabolites synthesized by the fungi within lichens, especially as mechanisms of defence.

== Honours and awards ==
In 2015 he became a research associate at the Smithsonian Institution. In 2021 he was awarded the Acharius Medal by the International Association for Lichenology for his outstanding lifetime achievements with lichens. Lawrey has been President of the American Bryological and Lichenological Society and the Washington Biologists Field Club (1996–1999), associate editor of The Lichenologist and senior editor of The Bryologist.

The genus of lichenicolous fungi Lawreymyces Lücking & Moncada has been named in his honor, as have the lichen species Dictyonema lawreyi Dal Forno, Kaminsky & Lücking and Parmotrema lawreyi Bungartz & Spielmann.

== Publications ==
Lawrey is the author or co-author of at least a hundred scientific papers and book chapters as well as a book about the fungi of lichens. His most significant include:

- Diederich, P., J. D. Lawrey & D. Ertz. 2018. The 2018 classification and checklist of lichenicolous fungi, with 2000 non-lichenized, obligately lichenicolous taxa. The Bryologist 121: 340-425.
- Lücking, R., M. Dal-Forno, M. Sikaroodi, P. M. Gillevet, F. Bungartz, B. Moncada, A. Yánez-Ayabaca, J. L. Chaves, L. F. Coca & J. D. Lawrey. 2014. A single macrolichen constitutes hundreds of unrecognized species. Proceedings of the National Academy of Sciences U.S.A. 111: 11091-11096.
- James Lawrey (1984) Biology of Lichenized Fungi Praeger 418pp ISBN 978 0275912116

By 2019 Lawrey had established two new orders of lichens (Lichenoconiales Diederich, Lawrey & K.D. Hyde and Lichenostigmatales Ertz, Diederich & Lawrey), two new families (Lepidostromataceae Ertz, Eb. Fisch., Killmann, Sérusiaux, & Lawrey and Lichenoconiaceae Diederich & Lawrey), eight new genera, and 37 species.

== See also ==
- Category:Taxa named by James D. Lawrey
