= Basidiolichen =

Lichen with a Basidiomycota mycobiont

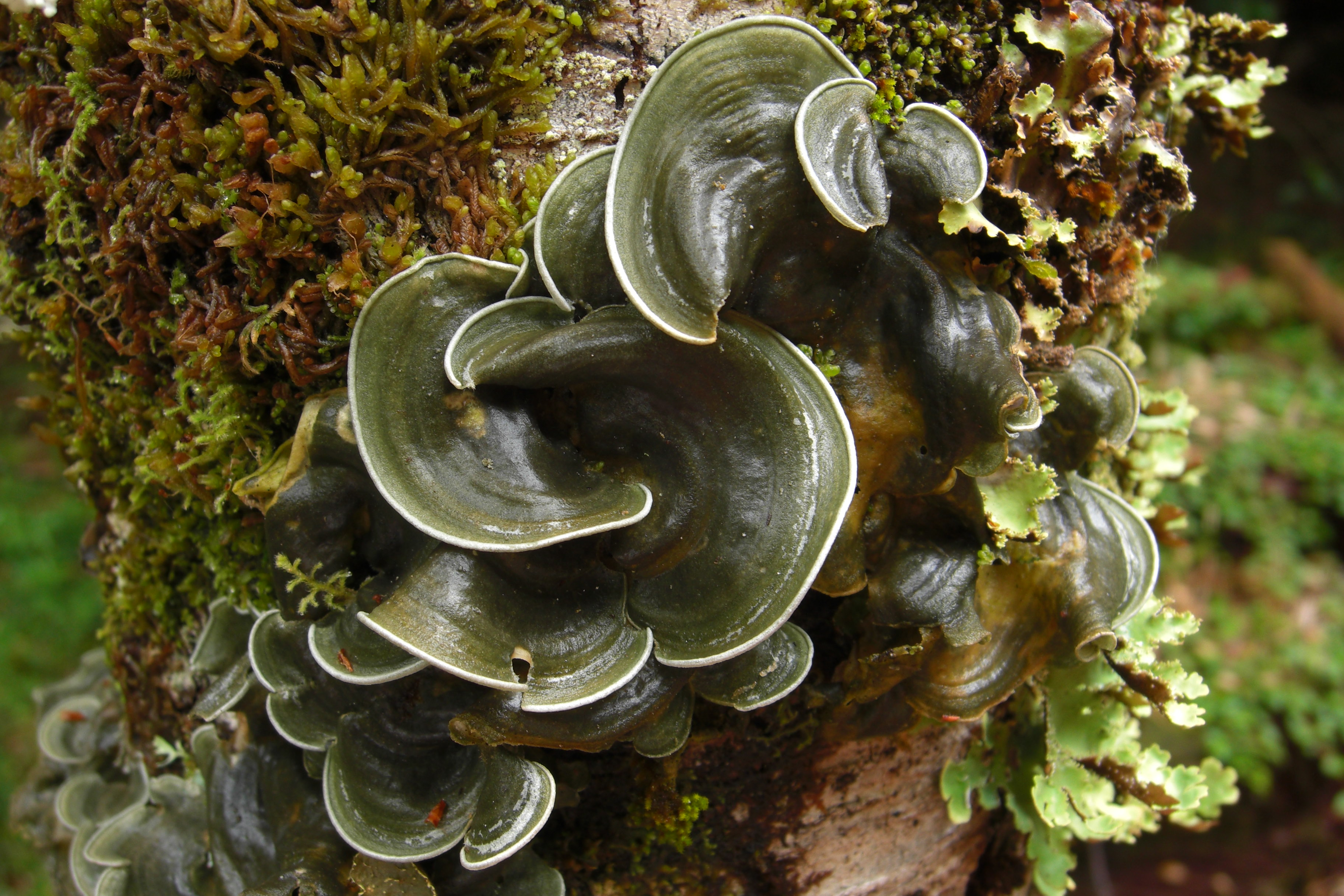
Cora glabrata

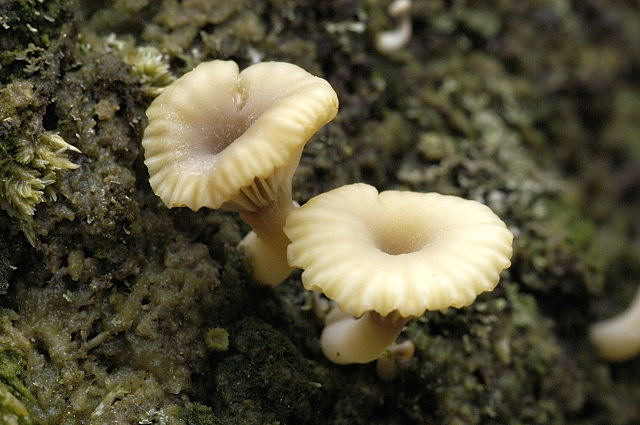
Lichenomphalia umbellifera

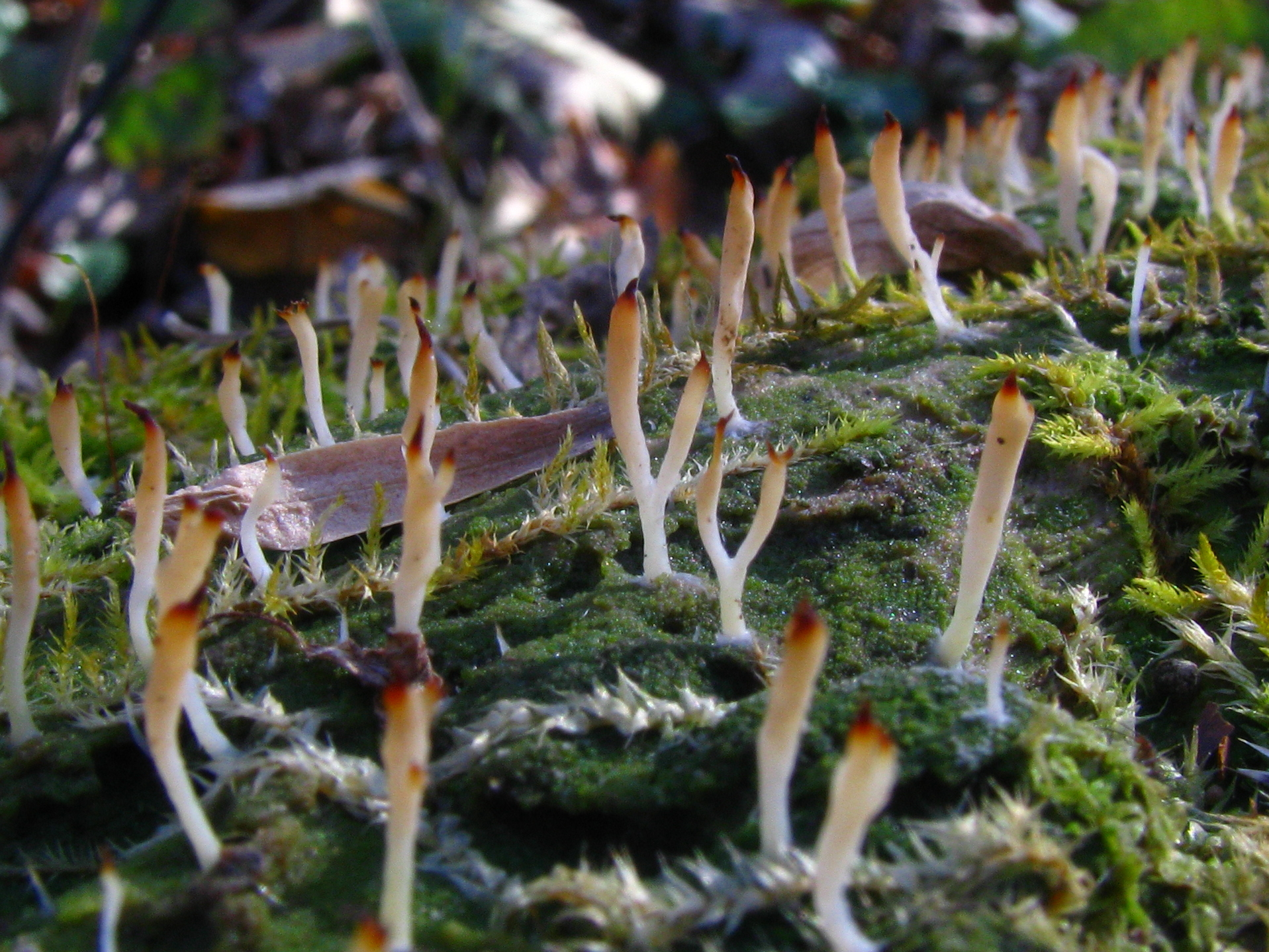
Multiclavula mucida

Basidiolichens are lichenized members of the division Basidiomycota within the subkingdom Dikarya of the kingdom Fungi. They form a very diverse yet much smaller group of lichens than the far more common ascolichens of the division Ascomycota. Owing to how few described species there are, basidiolichens are generally considered to be poorly researched, and few studies that characterize their natural products exist. Biogeographically, basidiolichen species may be distributed in a cosmopolitan manner or more regionally, ranging from arctic and montane habitats to more temperate and tropical environments. Morphologically, basidiocarp (fruiting body) and thallus (vegetative tissue) structures may vary widely within and between basidiolichen genera.

== Taxonomy ==
Basidiolichen mycobionts consist of 172 known species (0.9% of the total number of accepted lichen species) across 15 genera, 5 families, and 5 orders within the class Agaricomycetes in the fungal division Basidiomycota. The majority of described basidiolichen mycobionts belong to the genus Cora, followed by the genera Dictyonema and Multiclavula. Other genera include Acantholichen, Arrhenia, Athelia, Athelopsis, Corella, Cyphellostereum, Ertzia, Lepidostroma, Lichenomphalia, Marchandiomphalina, Semiomphalina, and Sulzbacheromyces. The species Marasmiellus affixus is suggested to be yet another lichen-forming basidiomycete, but this has yet to be proven. As a distinction, many basidiomycetes are lichenicolous and exclusively inhabit their host lichens; these interactions, however, are secondary to the mutualistic mycobiont-photobiont interaction that determines more directly whether a lichen is considered an ascolichen or basidiolichen.

Basidiolichen photobionts are less described but are known to belong to the cyanobacterial genera Scytonema and Rhizonema and to the algal genera Coccomyxa (class Trebouxiophyceae) and Bracteacoccus (class Chlorophyceae).

== Biogeography ==
While localized primarily in the tropical and montane environments of Central and South America, specimens of the basidiolichen genus Cora have also been identified in the South Atlantic, Africa, and Asia.

In arctic, alpine, and temperate forests, the most common basidiolichens are in the agaric genus Lichenomphalia (including former members of Omphalina or Gerronema) and the clavarioid genus Multiclavula. Several lichenized genera occur in tropical regions, the most common being the foliose Dictyonema.

== Morphology ==
The interactions between mycobionts and photobionts in basidiolichens occur primarily at the level of the thallus. In basidiolichens of the genera Acantholichen, Cora, and Dictyonema, photobionts may be penetrated by hyphal tips called haustoria and thereby assimilated into the complete lichen thallus. In some Lepidostroma species, the hyphal tips may develop into flattened appressoria to interact with the photobiont. In species of Athelia, Athelopsis, Cyphellostereum, Lepidostroma, and especially Multiclavula, the association takes the form of globular photobiont clusters ensheathed by fungal hyphae.

Basidiolichen genera within the family Hygrophoraceae possess a variety of basidiocarp structures. Within the genus Cora, fruiting bodies are often lobed and may be glabrous (smooth and glossy) or setose (bristly), ranging in color from green to white. Basidiolichens of the genus Lichenomphalia are more agaricoid (mushroom-like) in appearance, possessing a funnel-shaped cap, stalk, and gills. Members of Cyphellostereum form small white fan-like basidiocarps. The genus Multiclavula of the family Clavulinaceae as well as the genera within the family Lepidostromataceae are characterized by their clavarioid (erect, club-shaped, sometimes branching) fruiting bodies. The genus Marchandiomphalina of the family Corticiaceae comprises only one species, the corticoid (crust-like) M. foliacea. Its lack of conspicuous basidiocarps is a quality shared also by the two basidiolichen species of the family Atheliaceae.

== Natural products ==
The lichen species Cora glabrata has been reported to produce a hemagglutinating lectin as well as various polysaccharides, including a unique (1→6)-linked β-D-mannan.

Tentative chemical analyses suggest that the newly described Dictyonema huaorani produces the psychedelic psilocybin. The basidiolichen was previously reported to have been used in the Ecuadorian Amazon by Huaorani shamans to call upon evil spirits and curse people.
