= List of restriction enzyme cutting sites: A =

Legend of nucleobases
Code	Nucleotide represented
A	Adenine (A)
C	Cytosine (C)
G	Guanine (G)
T	Thymine (T)
N	A, C, G or T
M	A or C
R	A or G
W	A or T
Y	C or T
S	C or G
K	G or T
H	A, C or T
B	C, G or T
V	A, C or G
D	A, G or T

This article contains a list of restriction enzymes whose names start with A and have a clearly defined cutting site.

The following information is given for each enzyme:

- Name of Restriction Enzyme: Accepted name of the molecule, according to the internationally adopted nomenclature, and bibliographical references. Note: When alphabetizing, enzymes are first ordered alphabetically by the acronyms (everything before the roman numeral); then enzymes of a given acronym are ordered alphabetically by the roman numeral, treating the numeral as a number and not a string of letters. This helps keep the entries ordered hierarchically while also alphabetic.(Further reading: see the section "Nomenclature" in the article "Restriction enzyme".)
- PDB code: Code used to identify the structure of a protein in the PDB database of protein structures. The 3D atomic structure of a protein provides highly valuable information to understand the intimate details of its mechanism of action.
- REBASE Number: Number used to identify restriction enzymes in the REBASE restriction enzyme database. This database includes important information about the enzyme such as Recognition sequence, source, and Isoschizomers, as well as other data, such as the commercial suppliers of the enzyme.
- Source: Organism that naturally produces the enzyme.
- Recognition sequence: Sequence of DNA recognized by the enzyme and to which it specifically binds.
- Cut: Displays the cut site and pattern and products of the cut. The recognition sequence and the cut site usually match, but sometimes the cut site can be dozens of nucleotides away from the recognition site.
- Isoschizomers and neoschizomers: An isoschizomer is a restriction enzyme that recognizes the same sequence as another. A neoschizomer is a special type of isoschizomer that recognizes the same sequence as another, but cuts in a different manner. A maximum number of 8–10 most common isoschizomers are indicated for every enzyme but there may be many more. Neoschizomers are shown in bold and green color font (e.g.: **BamHI**). When "None as of [date]" is indicated, that means that there were no registered isoschizomers in the databases on that date with a clearly defined cutting site. Isoschizomers indicated in white font and grey background correspond to enzymes not listed in the current lists, as in this not listed enzyme: Abc123I

== Restriction enzymes ==
=== A ===
Enzyme	PDB code	REBASE Number	Source	Recognition sequence	Cut	Isoschizomers
AaaI		1	Acetobacter aceti	5' CGGCCG; 3' GCCGGC	5' ---C GGCCG--- 3'; 3' ---GCCGG C--- 5'	BseX3I, BstZI, EagI, EclXI, Eco52I, SenPT16I, XmaIII
AagI		4	Achromobacter agile	5' ATCGAT; 3' TAGCTA	5' ---AT CGAT--- 3'; 3' ---TAGC TA--- 5'	BanIII, BavCI, Bsa29I, BseCI, BspDI, Bsu15I, BsuTUI, ClaI
AanI		15358	Arthrobacter aurescens RFL2	5' TTATAA; 3' AATATT	5' ---TTA TAA--- 3'; 3' ---AAT ATT--- 5'	PsiI, Csp1BORF7380P
AarI		2892	Arthrobacter aurescens SS2-322	5' CACCTGC; 3' GTGGACG	5' ---CACCTGCN_{3}N NNNN--- 3'; 3' ---GTGGACGN_{3}NNNNN --- 5'	PaqCI
AasI		5465	Arthrobacter aurescens RFL3	5' GACN_{6}GTC; 3' CTGN_{6}CAG	5' ---GACNNNN NNGTC--- 3'; 3' ---CTGNN NNNNCAG--- 5'	DrdI, DseDI
AatI		6	Acetobacter aceti	5' AGGCCT; 3' TCCGGA	5' ---AGG CCT--- 3'; 3' ---TCC GGA--- 5'	AspMI, Eco147I, Eco1524I, PceI, Pme55I, SarI, Sru30DI, SteI
AatII		7	Acetobacter aceti	5' GACGTC; 3' CTGCAG	5' ---GACGT C--- 3'; 3' ---C TGCAG--- 5'	Ssp5230I, ZraI
AauI		3010	Arthrobacter aurescens	5' TGTACA; 3' ACATGT	5' ---T GTACA--- 3'; 3' ---ACATG T--- 5'	BsmRI, Bsp1407I, BsrGI, BstAUI, Ssp4800I, SspBI
AbaI		3029	Azospirillum brasilense UQ 1796	5' TGATCA; 3' ACTAGT	5' ---T GATCA--- 3'; 3' ---ACTAG T--- 5'	BclI, BsiQI, BspXII, BstT7I, FbaI, Ksp22I, ParI
AbeI		3097	Azotobacter beijerinckii Slo 54-028	5' CCTCAGC; 3' GGAGTCG	5' ---CC TCAGC--- 3'; 3' ---GGAGT CG--- 5'	BbvCI
AbrI		8	Azospirillum brasilense	5' CTCGAG; 3' GAGCTC	5' ---C TCGAG--- 3'; 3' ---GAGCT C--- 5'	BluI, BspAAI, BssHI, EscI, PaeR7I, **SciI**, Sfr274I, Sol10179I, StrI, TliI
AbsI		14594	Arthrobacter sp. 7M06	5' CCTCGAGG; 3' GGAGCTCC	5' ---CC TCGAGG--- 3'; 3' ---GGAGCT CC--- 5'	None as of 4 Apr. 2019
AccI		18	Acinetobacter calcoaceticus	5' GTMKAC; 3' CAKMTG	5' ---GT MKAC--- 3'; 3' ---CAKM TG--- 5'	FblI, XmiI
AccII		19	Acinetobacter calcoaceticus	5' CGCG; 3' GCGC	5' ---CG CG--- 3'; 3' ---GC GC--- 5'	Bsh1236I, Bsp50I, BstFNI, BstUI, MvnI, **SelI**, BceBI, BepI, Bpu95I
AccIII		20	Acinetobacter calcoaceticus	5' TCCGGA; 3' AGGCCT	5' ---T CCGGA--- 3'; 3' ---AGGCC T--- 5'	Aor13HI, BbvAIII, BlfI, BseAI, BsiMI, BspEI, CauB3I, Kpn2I, MroI, PtaI
Acc16I		2638	Acinetobacter calcoaceticus 16	5' TGCGCA; 3' ACGCGT	5' ---TGC GCA--- 3'; 3' ---ACG CGT--- 5'	AosI, AviII, FdiII, FspI, MstI, NsbI, PamI, Pun14627I
Acc36I		4162	Acinetobacter calcoaceticus 36	5' ACCTGC; 3' TGGACG	5' ---ACCTGCN_{3}N NNNN--- 3'; 3' ---TGGACGN_{3}NNNNN --- 5'	BfuAI, BspMI, BveI
Acc65I		14	Acinetobacter calcoaceticus 65	5' GGTACC; 3' CCATGG	5' ---G GTACC--- 3'; 3' ---CCATG G--- 5'	AhaB8I, Asp718I, **KpnI**, SthI
Acc113I		2665	Acinetobacter calcoaceticus 113	5' AGTACT; 3' TCATGA	5' ---AGT ACT--- 3'; 3' ---TCA TGA--- 5'	AssI, BmcAI, Bpa34I, DpaI, Eco255I, RflFII, ScaI, ZrmI
AccB1I		15	Acinetobacter calcoaceticus B1	5' GGYRCC; 3' CCRYGG	5' ---G GYRCC--- 3'; 3' ---CCRYG G--- 5'	BanI, BbvBI, BshNI, BspT107I, Eco64I, HgiCI, HgiHI, MspB4I
AccB2I		2666	Acinetobacter calcoaceticus B2	5' RGCGCY; 3' YCGCGR	5' ---RGCGC Y--- 3'; 3' ---Y CGCGR--- 5'	BfoI, **Bme142I**, Bsp143II, BstH2I, HaeII, **LpnI**
AccB7I		16	Acinetobacter calcoaceticus B7	5' CCAN_{5}TGG; 3' GGTN_{5}ACC	5' ---CCANNNN NTGG--- 3'; 3' ---GGTN NNNNACC--- 5'	AcpII, Asp10HII, BasI, Esp1396I, PflBI, PflMI, Van91I
AccBSI		2733	Acinetobacter calcoaceticus BS	5' CCGCTC; 3' GGCGAG	5' ---CCG CTC--- 3'; 3' ---GGC GAG--- 5'	BsrBI, BstD102I, Bst31NI, MbiI
AccEBI		17	Acinetobacter calcoaceticus EBF 65/65	5' GGATCC; 3' CCTAGG	5' ---G GATCC--- 3'; 3' ---CCTAG G--- 5'	AsiI, BamHI, Bce751I, Bsp98I, BspAAIII, CelI, OkrAI, Uba4009I
AceI		2571	Anabaena cedrorum	5' GCWGC; 3' CGWCG	5' ---G CWGC--- 3'; 3' ---CGWC G--- 5'	ApeKI, SuiI, Taq52I, TseI
AceII		2570	Anabaena cedrorum	5' GCTAGC; 3' CGATCG	5' ---GCTAG C--- 3'; 3' ---C GATCG--- 5'	**AsuNHI**, BmtI, BspOI, , **LlaG2I**, **NheI**, **PstNHI**
AceIII		2569	Anabaena cedrorum	5' CAGCTC; 3' GTCGAG	5' ---CAGCTCN_{5}N NNNN--- 3'; 3' ---GTCGAGN_{5}NNNNN --- 5'	— None as of May 2010 —
AciI		21	Arthrobacter citreus	5' CCGC; 3' GGCG	5' ---C CGC--- 3'; 3' ---GGC G--- 5'	SsiI
AclI		2181	Acinetobacter calcoaceticus M4	5' AACGTT; 3' TTGCAA	5' ---AA CGTT--- 3'; 3' ---TTGC AA--- 5'	Psp1406I
AclNI		2667	Acinetobacter calcoaceticus N20	5' ACTAGT; 3' TGATCA	5' ---A CTAGT--- 3'; 3' ---TGATC A--- 5'	AhlI, BcuI, SpeI
AclWI		2668	Acinetobacter calcoaceticus W2131	5' GGATC; 3' CCTAG	5' ---GGATCN_{3}N N--- 3'; 3' ---CCTAGN_{3}NN --- 5'	AlwI, BinI, BpuFI, BsrWI, BspPI, BstH9I, Bst31TI, EacI, Ral8I
AcoI		11822	Acinetobacter calcoaceticus	5' YGGCCR; 3' RCCGGY	5' ---Y GGCCR--- 3'; 3' ---RCCGG Y--- 5'	EaeI, Bfi89I, CfrI, EcoHK31I
AcpI		22	Acidiphilium cryptum 25H	5' TTCGAA; 3' AAGCTT	5' ---TT CGAA--- 3'; 3' ---AAGC TT--- 5'	Asp10HI, Bpu14I, Bsp119I, BstBI, Csp45I, FspII, MlaI, NspV, SspRFI
AcpII		23	Acidiphilium cryptum 25H	5' CCAN_{5}TGG; 3' GGTN_{5}ACC	5' ---CCANNNN NTGG--- 3'; 3' ---GGTN NNNNACC--- 5'	AccB7I, Asp10HII, BasI, Esp1396I, PflBI, PflMI, Van91I
AcrII		25	Anabaenopsis circularis	5' GGTNACC; 3' CCANTGG	5' ---G GTNACC--- 3'; 3' ---CCANTG G--- 5'	AspAI, Bse64I, BseT9I, BstEII, BstPI, Eco91I, EcoO65I, PspEI
AcsI		2184	Arthrobacter citreus 310	5' RAATTY; 3' YTTAAR	5' ---R AATTY--- 3'; 3' ---YTTAA R--- 5'	ApoI, CfaI, FsiI, XapI
AcuI		5534	Acinetobacter calcoaceticus	5' CTGAAG; 3' GACTTC	5' ---CTGAAGN_{13}NNN --- 3'; 3' ---GACTTCN_{13}N NN--- 5'	BspKT5I, Eco57I
AcvI		5359	Aeromonas caviae	5' CACGTG; 3' GTGCAC	5' ---CAC GTG--- 3'; 3' ---GTG CAC--- 5'	BbrPI, BcoAI, Eco72I, PmaCI, PmlI, PspCI
AcyI		31	Anabaena cylindrica	5' GRCGYC; 3' CYGCRG	5' ---GR CGYC--- 3'; 3' ---CYGC RG--- 5'	AhaII, AosII, BbiII, BsaHI, BstACI, Hin1I, HgiI, Hsp92I, Msp17I
AdeI		2991	Alcaligenes denitrificans Ss 3-028	5' CACNNNGTG; 3' GTGNNNCAC	5' ---CACNNN GTG--- 3'; 3' ---GTG NNNCAC--- 5'	BstIZ316I, DraIII
AeuI		33	Achromobacter eurydice	5' CCWGG; 3' GGWCC	5' ---CC WGG--- 3'; 3' ---GGW CC--- 5'	AglI, **AjnI**, BseBI, BstNI, BstOI, Bst2UI, **EcoRII**, **SleI**, **SspAI**
AfaI		37	Acidiphilium facilis 28H	5' GTAC; 3' CATG	5' ---GT AC--- 3'; 3' ---CA TG--- 5'	**Csp6I**, **CviQI**, **CviRII**, HpyBI, **PabI**, PlaAII, RsaI, **RsaNI**
Afa16RI		34	Acidiphilium sp. 16R	5' CGATCG; 3' GCTAGC	5' ---CGAT CG--- 3'; 3' ---GC TAGC--- 5'	Afa22MI, BspCI, EagBI, MvrI, NblI, Ple19I, PvuI, Psu161I, RshI, XorII
Afa22MI		35	Acidocella facilis	5' CGATCG; 3' GCTAGC	5' ---CGAT CG--- 3'; 3' ---GC TAGC--- 5'	Afa16RI, BspCI, EagBI, ErhB9I, NblI, Ple19I, Psu161I, PvuI, RshI
AfeI		2669	Alcaligenes faecalis T2774	5' AGCGCT; 3' TCGCGA	5' ---AGC GCT--- 3'; 3' ---TCG CGA--- 5'	AitI, Aor51H, Eco47III, FunI
AfiI		10489	Anoxybacillus flavithermus	5' CCN_{7}GG; 3' GGN_{7}CC	5' ---CCNNNNN NNGG--- 3'; 3' ---GGNN NNNNNCC--- 5'	Bsc4I, BseLI, BslI, BflI, Bsc107I, BsiYI, Bst22I
AflI			Anabaena flos-aquae	5' GGWCC; 3' CCWGG	5' ---G GWCC--- 3'; 3' ---CCWG G--- 5'	Asp745I, BamNI, BcuAI, CauI, Csp68KI, DsaIV, Eco47I, SinI
AflII		39	Anabaena flos-aquae	5' CTTAAG; 3' GAATTC	5' ---C TTAAG--- 3'; 3' ---GAATT C--- 5'	BfrI, BspTI, Bst98I, BstAFI, BstPZ740I, Esp4I, MspCI, Vha464I
AflIII		40	Anabaena flos-aquae	5' ACRYGT; 3' TGYRCA	5' ---A CRYGT--- 3'; 3' ---TGYRC A--- 5'	Asp90I
AgeI		42	Agrobacterium gelatinovorum	5' ACCGGT; 3' TGGCCA	5' ---A CCGGT--- 3'; 3' ---TGGCC A--- 5'	AsiAI, AsiGI, BshTI, CsiAI, CspAI, PinAI
AglI		6652	Arthrobacter globiformis	5' CCWGG; 3' GGWCC	5' ---CC WGG--- 3'; 3' ---GGW CC--- 5'	AeuI, Bse16I, Bse17I, Bse24I, BshGI, **EcoRII**, **SleI**, SniI, SslI
AgsI			Agrococcus sp. 25	5' TTSAA; 3' AASTT	5' ---TTS AA--- 3'; 5' ---AA STT--- 3'	None as of 4 May 2019
AhaI		45	Alteromonas haloplanktis B8	5' CCSGG; 3' GGSCC	5' ---CC SGG--- 3'; 3' ---GGS CC--- 5'	AseII, BcnI, BpuMI, CauII, **Eco1831I**, **EcoHI**, HgiS22I, NciI
AhaII			Aphanothece halophytica	5' GRCGYC; 3' CYGCRG	5' ---GR CGYC--- 3'; 3' ---CYGC RG--- 5'	AcyI, AstWI, AsuIII, BsaHI, BstACI, Hin1I, HgiI, HgiDI, HgiHII, PamII
AhaIII			Aphanothece halophytica	5' TTTAAA; 3' AAATTT	5' ---TTT AAA--- 3'; 3' ---AAA TTT--- 5'	DraI, PauAII, SruI
AhaB8I			Aphanothece halophytica B8	5' GGTACC; 3' CCATGG	5' ---G GTACC--- 3'; 3' ---CCATG G--- 5'	Acc65I, Asp718I, **KpnI**, SthI
AhdI			Aeromonas hydrophila	5' GACN_{5}GTC; 3' CTGN_{5}CAG	5' ---GACNNN NNGTC--- 3'; 3' ---CTGNN NNNCAG--- 5'	AspEI, BmeRI, BspOVI, DriI, Eam1105I, EclHKI, NruGI
AhlI		4838	Alteromonas haloplanktis SP	5' ACTAGT; 3' TGATCA	5' ---A CTAGT--- 3'; 3' ---TGATC A--- 5'	AclNI, BcuI, SpeI
AhyI		49	Aeromonas hydrophila	5' CCCGGG; 3' GGGCCC	5' ---C CCGGG--- 3'; 3' ---GGGCC C--- 5'	Cfr9I, **CfrJ4I**, EaeAI, EclRI, **PaeBI**, **SmaI**, TspMI, XmaI, XmaCI
AitI		54	Aquaspirillum itersonii	5' AGCGCT; 3' TCGCGA	5' ---AGC GCT--- 3'; 3' ---TCG CGA--- 5'	AfeI, Aor51H, Eco47III, FunI
AjiI		10919	Acinetobacter johnsonii RFL47	5' CACGTC; 3' GTGCAG	5' ---CAC GTC--- 3'; 3' ---GTG CAG--- 5'	BmgBI, BtrI
AjnI		7185	Acinetobacter johnsonii R2	5' CCWGG; 3' GGWCC	5' --- CCWGG--- 3'; 3' ---GGWCC --- 5'	**AorI**, **ApaORI**, **ApyI**, EcoRII, **MvaI**, Psp6I, PspGI, SleI, SspAI
AjoI		2604	Acinetobacter johnsonii 35	5' CTGCAG; 3' GACGTC	5' ---CTGCA G--- 3'; 3' ---G ACGTC--- 5'	ApiI, BloHII, BspMAI, CfrA4I, CfuII, PstI, SalPI, SflI, Srl5DI
AjuI		7740	Acinetobacter junii RFL46	5' GAAN_{7}TTGG; 3'CTTN_{7}AACC	5' ---NNNNN NN_{6}GAAN_{7}TTGGN_{5}NNNNNN --- 3'; 3' --- NNNNNNN_{6}CTTN_{7}AACCN_{5}N NNNNN--- 5'	None as of 28 Oct. 2020
AleI		5791	Aureobacterium liquefaciens	5' CACN_{4}GTG; 3' GTGN_{4}CAC	5' ---CACNN NNGTG--- 3'; 3' ---GTGNN NNCAC--- 5'	OliI
AlfI		6110	Acinetobacter lwoffii BH 32	5' GCAN_{6}TGC; 3' CGTN_{6}ACG	5' ---GCAN_{6}TGCN_{9}NNN --- 3'; 3' ---CGTN_{6}ACGN_{9}N NN--- 5'	None as of May 2010
AliI			Acetobacter liquefaciens	5' GGATCC; 3' CCTAGG	5' ---G GATCC--- 3'; 3' ---CCTAG G--- 5'	AccEBI, BamHI, Bce751I, Bsp98I, BspAAIII, Nsp29132II, Pfl8I
AliAJI		59	Acetobacter liquefaciens AJ 2881	5' CTGCAG; 3' GACGTC	5' ---CTGCA G--- 3'; 3' ---G ACGTC--- 5'	ApiI, Asp713I, BspMAI, CflI, CstI, MhaAI, PstI, SalPI, Sst12I, YenI
AloI		2812	Acinetobacter lwoffii Ks 4-8	5' GAACN_{6}TCC; 3' CTTGN_{6}AGG	5' ---GAACN_{6}TCCN_{6}NNNNNN --- 3'; 3' ---CTTGN_{6}AGGN_{6}N NNNNN--- 5'	None as of May 2010
AluI		61	Arthrobacter luteus	5' AGCT; 3' TCGA	5' ---AG CT--- 3'; 3' ---TC GA--- 5'	AluBI, MltI
AluBI		16189	Arthrobacter luteus B	5' AGCT; 3' TCGA	5' ---AG CT--- 3'; 3' ---TC GA--- 5'	AluI, MltI
AlwI		65	Acinetobacter lwoffii	5' GGATC; 3' CCTAG	5' ---GGATCN_{3}N N--- 3'; 3' ---CCTAGN_{3}NN --- 5'	AclWI, BinI, BspPI, BsrWI, BstH9I, BthII, Bth617I, EacI
Alw21I			Acinetobacter lwoffii RFL21	5' GWGCWC; 3' CWCGWG	5' ---GWGCW C--- 3'; 3' ---C WCGWG--- 5'	AspHI, Bbv12I, Bsh45I, BsiHKAI, Bsm6I, HgiAI, MspV281I
Alw26I		63	Acinetobacter lwoffii RFL26	5' GTCTC; 3' CAGAG	5' ---GTCTCN NNNN--- 3'; 3' ---CAGAGNNNNN --- 5'	BcoDI, BscQII, BsmAI, BsoMAI, BstMAI
Alw44I			Acinetobacter lwoffii RFL44	5' GTGCAC; 3' CACGTG	5' ---G TGCAC--- 3'; 3' ---CACGT G--- 5'	ApaLI, SnoI, VneI
AlwNI			Acinetobacter lwoffii N	5' CAGNNNCTG; 3' GTCNNNGAC	5' ---CAGNNN CTG--- 3'; 3' ---GTC NNNGAC--- 5'	CaiI
AlwXI		67	Acinetobacter lwoffii X	5' GCAGC; 3' CGTCG	5' ---GCAGCN_{7}N NNNN--- 3'; 3' ---CGTCGN_{7}NNNNN --- 5'	BbvI, BseKI, BseXI, Bsp423I, Bst12I, Bst71I, BstV1I
Ama87I			Alteromonas macleodii 87	5' CYCGRG; 3' GRGCYC	5' ---C YCGRG--- 3'; 3' ---GRGCY C--- 5'	AquI, AvaI, BmeT110I, BsiHKCI, BsoBI, Eco88I, **Nli3877I**, NspSAI
AmaCSI		26714	Arthrospira maxima CS-328	5' GCTCCA; 3' CGAGGT	5' ---GCTCCAN_{8}NNN --- 3'; 3' ---CGAGGTN_{8}N NN--- 5'	None as of 4 May 2018
AocI		74	Anabaena sp.	5' CCTNAGG; 3' GGANTCC	5' ---CC TNAGG--- 3'; 3' ---GGANT CC--- 5'	AyI, Bse21I, Bsu36I, Eco81I, Lmu60I, OaNI, MstII, SauI, SshAI
AocII			Anabaena sp.	5' GDGCHC; 3' CHCGDG	5' ---GDGCH C--- 3'; 3' ---C HCGDG--- 5'	BmyI, BsoCI, Bsp1286I, BspLS2I, MhlI, NspII, SduI
AorI		77	Acetobacter aceti orleanensis	5' CCWGG; 3' GGWCC	5' ---CC WGG--- 3'; 3' ---GGW CC--- 5'	BseBI, BstNI, BstOI, Bst2UI, **EcoRII**, MvaI, Sth117I, Tai
Aor13HI			Acidiphilium organovorum 13H	5' TCCGGA; 3' AGGCCT	5' ---T CCGGA--- 3'; 3' ---AGGCC T--- 5'	AccIII, BbvAIII, BlfI, BseAI, BsiMI, BspEI, CauB3I, Kpn2I, MroI, PtaI
Aor51HI		76	Acidiphilium organovorum 51H	5' AGCGCT; 3' TCGCGA	5' ---AGC GCT--- 3'; 3' ---TCG CGA--- 5'	AfeI, AitI, Eco47III, FunI
AosI			Anabaena oscillarioides	5' TGCGCA; 3' ACGCGT	5' ---TGC GCA--- 3'; 3' ---ACG CGT--- 5'	Acc16I, AviII, FdiII, FspI, MstI, NsbI, PamI, Pun14627I
AosII			Anabaena oscillarioides	5' GRCGYC; 3' CYGCRG	5' ---GR CGYC--- 3'; 3' ---CYGC RG--- 5'	AcyI, AstWI, BbiII, BsaHI, BstACI, Hin1I, HgiI, HgiGI, Msp17I, PamII
ApaI			Acetobacter pasteurianus pasteurianus	5' GGGCCC; 3' CCCGGG	5' ---GGGCC C--- 3'; 3' ---C CCGGG--- 5'	Bsp120I, PpeI, PspOMI
ApaBI			Acetobacter pasteurianus B	5' GCAN_{5}TGC; 3' CGTN_{5}ACG	5' ---GCANNNNN TGC--- 3'; 3' ---CGT NNNNNACG--- 5'	**BstAPI**
ApaCI			Acetobacter pasteurianus C	5' GGATCC; 3' CCTAGG	5' ---G GATCC--- 3'; 3' ---CCTAG G--- 5'	AliI, BamHI, BnaI, Bsp4009I, BstI, NspSAIV, Pfl8I, SolI, SurI
ApaLI			Acetobacter pasteurianus	5' GTGCAC; 3' CACGTG	5' ---G TGCAC--- 3'; 3' ---CACGT G--- 5'	Alw44I, SnoI, VneI
ApaORI		86	Acetobacter pasteurianus	5' CCWGG; 3' GGWCC	5' ---CC WGG--- 3'; 3' ---GGW CC--- 5'	**AjnI**, BstNI, BstOI, Bst1I, Bst2I, Fsp1604I, MvaI, **Psp6I**, **PspGI**
ApeKI			Aeropyrum pernix K1	5' GCWGC; 3' CGWCG	5' ---G CWGC--- 3'; 3' ---CGWC G--- 5'	AceI, SuiI, Taq52I, TseI
ApiI		2315	Arthrobacter picolinophilus	5' CTGCAG; 3' GACGTC	5' ---CTGCA G--- 3'; 3' ---G ACGTC--- 5'	Asp713I, Bsp63I, CfrA4I, PaePI, Pfl21I, Psp23I, PstI, SflI, Sst12I
ApoI			Arthrobacter protophormiae	5' RAATTY; 3' YTTAAR	5' ---R AATTY--- 3'; 3' ---YTTAA R--- 5'	AcsI, CfaI, FsiI, XapI, EcoRI
AplI		25962	Arthrospira platensis NIES-39	5' CTGCAG; 3' GACGTC	5' ---CTGCA G--- 3'; 3' ---G ACGTC--- 5'	See this site for a complete list.
ApyI		93	Arthrobacter pyridinolis	5' CCWGG; 3' GGWCC	5' ---CC WGG--- 3'; 3' ---GGW CC--- 5'	BciBII, BptI, BseBI, BstNI, BstOI, Bst2UI, Bst38I, Bst100I, MvaI
ApyPI		14756	Arcanobacterium pyogenes	5' ATCGAC; 3' TAGCTG	5' ---ATCGACN_{17}NNN --- 3'; 3' ---TAGCTGN_{17}N NN--- 5'	None as of 4 August 2019
AquI			Agmenellum quadruplicatum PR-6	5' CYCGRG; 3' GRGCYC	5' ---C YCGRG--- 3'; 3' ---GRGCY C--- 5'	BcoI, BmeT110I, BsmAI, BsoMAI, BsoBI, BstSI, Eco27kI, OfoI
AquII		20238	Agmenellum quadruplicatum PR-6	5' GCCGNAC; 3' CGGCNTG	5' ---GCCGNACN_{17}NNN --- 3'; 3' ---CGGCNTGN_{17}N NN--- 5'	None as of 4 August 2019
AquIII		20239	Agmenellum quadruplicatum PR-6	5' GAGGAG; 3' CTCCTC	5' ---GAGGAGN_{17}NNN --- 3'; 3' ---CTCCTCN_{17}N NN--- 5'	**BseRI**
AquIV		20240	Agmenellum quadruplicatum PR-6	5' GRGGAAG; 3' CYCCTTC	5' ---GRGGAAGN_{16}NNN --- 3'; 3' ---CYCCTTCN_{16}N NN--- 5'	None as of 4/9/19
ArsI		19405	Arthrobacter sp. NTS	5' GACN_{6}TTYG; 3' CTGN_{6}AARC	5' ---NNNNN NN_{7}GACN_{6}TTYGN_{5}NNNNNN --- 3'; 3' --- NNNNNNN_{7}CTGN_{6}AARCN_{5}N NNNNN--- 5'	None as of Oct. 28 2020
AscI			Arthrobacter sp.	5' GGCGCGCC; 3' CCGCGCGG	5' ---GG CGCGCC--- 3'; 3' ---CCGCGC GG--- 5'	PalAI, SgsI
AseI		96	Aquaspirillum serpens	5' ATTAAT; 3' TAATTA	5' ---AT TAAT--- 3'; 3' ---TAAT TA--- 5'	AsnI, BpoAI, PshBI, Sru4DI, VspI
AseII		97	Aquaspirillum serpens	5' CCSGG; 3' GGSCC	5' ---CC SGG--- 3'; 3' ---GGS CC--- 5'	AhaI, AsuC2I, BcnI, CauII, **EcoHI**, HgiS22I, **Kpn49kII**, Mgl14481I, NciI
AsiI			Azotobacter sp.	5' GGATCC; 3' CCTAGG	5' ---G GATCC--- 3'; 3' ---CCTAG G--- 5'	ApaCI, BamHI, BnaI, Bsp4009I, BstI, OkrAI, Pfl8I, SurI, Uba4009I
AsiAI		2853	Arthrobacter sp. A7359	5' ACCGGT; 3' TGGCCA	5' ---A CCGGT--- 3'; 3' ---TGGCC A--- 5'	AgeI, AsiGI, BshTI, CsiAI, CspAI, PinAI
AsiGI		10828	Arthrobacter sp. G	5' ACCGGT; 3' TGGCCA	5' ---A CCGGT--- 3'; 3' ---TGGCC A--- 5'	AgeI, AsiAI, BshTI, CsiAI, CspAI, PinAI
AsiSI			Arthrobacter sp.	5' GCGATCGC; 3' CGCTAGCG	5' ---GCGAT CGC--- 3'; 3' ---CGC TAGCG--- 5'	RgaI, SfaAI, , SgfI
Asi256I		18472	Arthrobacter sp. Ck256	5' GATC; 3' CTAG	5' ---G ATC--- 3'; 3' ---CTA G--- 5'	See this site for a complete list.
Asi372I		15803	Arthrobacter sp. Mn372	5' ATGCAT; 3' TACGTA	5' ---ATGCA T--- 3'; 3' ---T ACGTA--- 5'	**Ppu10I**, EcoT22I, Mph1103I, NsiI, Zsp2I, BfrBI, Csp68KIII, PinBI, SepI, SspD5II
AsnI		98	Arthrobacter sp. N-CM	5' ATTAAT; 3' TAATTA	5' ---AT TAAT--- 3'; 3' ---TAAT TA--- 5'	AseI, BpoAI, PshBI, Sru4DI, VspI
AspI			Achromobacter sp. 699	5' GACNNNGTC; 3' CTGNNNCAG	5' ---GACN NNGTC--- 3'; 3' ---CTGNN NCAG--- 5'	AtsI, PflFI, PsyI, TelI, Tth111I
Asp10HI			Acidiphilium sp. 10H	5' TTCGAA; 3' AAGCTT	5' ---TT CGAA--- 3'; 3' ---AAGC TT--- 5'	AsuII, BspT104I, BstBI, CbiI, Csp68KII, PlaII, PpaAI, Ssp1I
Asp10HII		100	Acidiphilium sp. 10H	5' CCAN_{5}TGG; 3' GGTN_{5}ACC	5' ---CCANNNN NTGG--- 3'; 3' ---GGTN NNNNACC--- 5'	AccB7I, AcpII, BasI, Esp1396I, PflBI, PflMI, Van91I
Asp26HI		111	Acidiphilium sp. 26H	5' GAATGC; 3' CTTACG	5' ---GAATGCN --- 3'; 3' ---CTTAC GN--- 5'	Asp27HI, Asp35HI, Asp36HI, BsaMI, BscCI, BsmI, PctI
Asp27HI		112	Acidiphilium sp. 27H	5' GAATGC; 3' CTTACG	5' ---GAATGCN --- 3'; 3' ---CTTAC GN--- 5'	Asp35HI, Asp36HI, Asp40HI, BmaHI, BsaMI, BscCI, BsmI
Asp35HI		117	Acidiphilium sp. 35H	5' GAATGC; 3' CTTACG	5' ---GAATGCN --- 3'; 3' ---CTTAC GN--- 5'	Asp36HI, Asp40HI, Asp50HI, BsaMI, BscCI, BsmI, Mva1269I
Asp36HI		118	Acidiphilium sp. 36H	5' GAATGC; 3' CTTACG	5' ---GAATGCN --- 3'; 3' ---CTTAC GN--- 5'	Asp40HI, Asp50HI, BmaHI, BscCI, BsmI, Mva1269I, PctI
Asp40HI		120	Acidiphilium sp. 40H	5' GAATGC; 3' CTTACG	5' ---GAATGCN --- 3'; 3' ---CTTAC GN--- 5'	Asp27HI, Asp36HI, Asp50HI, BsaMI, BscCI, BsmI, Mva1269I
Asp50HI		122	Acidiphilium sp. 50H	5' GAATGC; 3' CTTACG	5' ---GAATGCN --- 3'; 3' ---CTTAC GN--- 5'	Asp26HI, Asp35HI, Asp36HI, BsaMI, BscCI, BsmI, Mva1269I
Asp700I			Achromobacter sp. 700	5' GAAN_{4}TTC; 3' CTTN_{4}AAG	5' ---GAANN NNTTC--- 3'; 3' ---CTTNN NNAAG--- 5'	BbvAI, MroXI, PdmI, XmnI
Asp713I		131	Achromobacter sp. 713	5' CTGCAG; 3' GACGTC	5' ---CTGCA G--- 3'; 3' ---G ACGTC--- 5'	AjoI, AliAJI, BloHII, CfrA4I, Ecl37kI, MhaAI, PstI, SflI, Srl5DI, YenI
Asp718I			Achromobacter sp. 718	5' GGTACC; 3' CCATGG	5' ---G GTACC--- 3'; 3' ---CCATG G--- 5'	Acc65I, AhaB8I, **KpnI**, SthI
Asp745I			Achromobacter sp. 745	5' GGWCC; 3' CCWGG	5' ---G GWCC--- 3'; 3' ---CCWG G--- 5'	Bme18I, BsrAI, CauI, Eco47I, ErpI, FdiI, SinI, **VpaK11AI**, VpaK11BI
AspAI			Alcaligenes sp.	5' GGTNACC; 3' CCANTGG	5' ---G GTNACC--- 3'; 3' ---CCANTG G--- 5'	AcrII, Bse64I, BseT10I, BstEII, BstPI, Eco91I, EcoO65I, PspEI
AspA2I		6959	Arthrobacter sp. A2	5' CCTAGG; 3' GGATCC	5' ---C CTAGG--- 3'; 3' ---GGATC C--- 5'	AvrBII, AvrII, BlnI, BspA2I, XmaJI
AspEI			Aureobacterium sp.	5' GACN_{5}GTC; 3' CTGN_{5}CAG	5' ---GACNNN NNGTC--- 3'; 3' ---CTGNN NNNCAG--- 5'	AhdI, BmeRI, BspOVI, DriI, Eam1105I, EclHKI, NruGI
AspHI			Achromobacter sp. H	5' GWGCWC; 3' CWCGWG	5' ---GWGCW C--- 3'; 3' ---C WCGWG--- 5'	Alw21I, Bbv12I, Bsh45I, BsiHKAI, Bsm6I, HgiAI, MspV281I
AspLEI			Arthrobacter sp. LE3860	5' GCGC; 3' CGCG	5' ---GCG C--- 3'; 3' ---C GCG--- 5'	BspLAI, BstHHI, CfoI, FnuDIII, HhaI, **Hin6I**, **HinP1I**, **HsoI**, **HspAI**, **SciNI**
AspMI		2977	Acinetobacter sp. M	5' AGGCCT; 3' TCCGGA	5' ---AGG CCT--- 3'; 3' ---TCC GGA--- 5'	AatI, Eco147I, GdiI, PceI, SarI, Sru30DI, SseBI, SteI, StuI
AspMDI			Alcaligenes sp. MD1	5' GATC; 3' CTAG	5' --- GATC--- 3'; 3' ---CTAG --- 5'	BfuCI, Bsp143I, BstMBI, DpnII, Kzo9I, MboI, NdeII, Sau3AI
AspNI			Anabaena sp. J3	5' GGNNCC; 3' CCNNGG	5' ---GGN NCC--- 3'; 3' ---CCN NGG--- 5'	BmiI, BscBI, BspLI, NlaIV, PspN4I
AspS9I			Arthrobacter sp. S9	5' GGNCC; 3' CCNGG	5' ---G GNCC--- 3'; 3' ---CCNG G--- 5'	AsuI, AvcI, Bac36I, Bal228I, **FmuI**, NspIV, PspPI, Sau96I
AssI		4930	Arthrobacter sp.	5' AGTACT; 3' TCATGA	5' ---AGT ACT--- 3'; 3' ---TCA TGA--- 5'	Acc113I, BmcAI, Bpa34I, DpaI, Eco255I, RflFII, ScaI, ZrmI
AstWI			Anabaena sp.	5' GRCGYC; 3' CYGCRG	5' ---GR CGYC--- 3'; 3' ---CYGC RG--- 5'	AcyI, AsuIII, BsaHI, BstACI, Hin1I, HgiI, HgiDI, HgiGI, Msp17I
AsuI			Anabaena subcylindrica	5' GGNCC; 3' CCNGG	5' ---G GNCC--- 3'; 3' ---CCNG G--- 5'	AspS9I, AvcI, CcuI, Cfr13I, **FmuI**, MaeK81II, Nsp7121I, PspPI, **UnbI**
AsuII			Anabaena subcylindrica	5' TTCGAA; 3' AAGCTT	5' ---TT CGAA--- 3'; 3' ---AAGC TT--- 5'	AcpI, Bpu14I, Bsp119I, BspT104I, Csp45I, FspII, LspI, NspV, SfuI
AsuIII			Anabaena subcylindrica	5' GRCGYC; 3' CYGCRG	5' ---GR CGYC--- 3'; 3' ---CYGC RG--- 5'	AcyI, AsuIII, BbiII, BsaHI, BstACI, Hin1I, HgiHII, Hsp92I, Msp17I
AsuC2I		2901	Actinobacillus suis C2	5' CCSGG; 3' GGSCC	5' ---CC SGG--- 3'; 3' ---GGS CC--- 5'	AhaI, AseII, BcnI, **Eco1831I**, **EcoHI**, **Kpn49kII**, Mgl14481I, NciI
AsuHPI		2811	Actinobacillus suis HP	5' GGTGA; 3' CCACT	5' ---GGTGAN_{6}NN --- 3'; 3' ---CCACTN_{6}N N--- 5'	HphI, SspD5I
AsuNHI			Actinobacillus suis NH	5' GCTAGC; 3' CGATCG	5' ---G CTAGC--- 3'; 3' ---CGATC G--- 5'	**AceII**, **BmtI**, **BspOI,** LlaG2I, NheI, PstNHI
AtsI			Aureobacterium testaceum 4842	5' GACNNNGTC; 3' CTGNNNCAG	5' ---GACN NNGTC--- 3'; 3' ---CTGNN NCAG--- 5'	AspI, PflFI, PsyI, TelI, Tth111I
AvaI			Anabaena variabilis	5' CYCGRG; 3' GRGCYC	5' ---C YCGRG--- 3'; 3' ---GRGCY C--- 5'	AquI, Ama87I, BsiHKCI, BsoBI, BspLU4I, Eco88I, NspIII, PlaAI
AvaII			Anabaena variabilis	5' GGWCC; 3' CCWGG	5' ---G GWCC--- 3'; 3' ---CCWG G--- 5'	Bme18I, Bme216I, BsrAI, Eco47I, Kzo49I, **Psp03I**, SmuEI, **VpaK11AI**
AvcI			Actinomyces violaceoniger cristalomycini	5' GGNCC; 3' CCNGG	5' ---G GNCC--- 3'; 3' ---CCNG G--- 5'	AspS9I, BshKI, BsiZI, Bsp1894I, BspBII, BspF4I, Bsu54I, Pde12I
AviII			Anabaena variabillis (halle)	5' TGCGCA; 3' ACGCGT	5' ---TGC GCA--- 3'; 3' ---ACG CGT--- 5'	Acc16I, AosI, FdiII, FspI, MstI, NsbI, PamI, Pun14627I
AvrII		173	Anabaena variabilis UW	5' CCTAGG; 3' GGATCC	5' ---C CTAGG--- 3'; 3' ---GGATC C--- 5'	AspA2I, AvrBII, BlnI, BspA2I, XmaJI
AvrBII		171	Arthrobacter variabilis	5' CCTAGG; 3' GGATCC	5' ---C CTAGG--- 3'; 3' ---GGATC C--- 5'	AspA2I, AvrII, BlnI, BspA2I, XmaJI
AxyI		174	Acetobacter xylinus	5' CCTNAGG; 3' GGANTCC	5' ---CC TNAGG--- 3'; 3' ---GGANT CC--- 5'	AocI, BliHKI, Bse21I, BspR7I, Bsu36I, CvnI, Eco81I, Lmu60I

§ An HF version of this enzyme is available
