= Paralcaligenes ginsengisoli =

Scientific classification
- Domain: Bacteria
- Kingdom: Pseudomonadati
- Phylum: Pseudomonadota
- Class: Betaproteobacteria
- Order: Burkholderiales
- Family: Alcaligenaceae
- Genus: Paralcaligenes
- Species: P. ginsengisoli

Binomial name
- Paralcaligenes ginsengisoli Kang et al. 2015

Type strain
- JCM 30746, KCTC 42406, DCY104

Species of bacterium

Paralcaligenes ginsengisoli is a Gram-negative, strictly aerobic and motile bacterium from the genus Paralcaligenes which has been isolated from soil from ginseng field in Yeoncheon County in Korea.
