= Achromobacter obae =

Scientific classification
- Domain: Bacteria
- Kingdom: Pseudomonadati
- Phylum: Pseudomonadota
- Class: Betaproteobacteria
- Order: Burkholderiales
- Family: Alcaligenaceae
- Genus: Achromobacter
- Species: A. obae

Binomial name
- Achromobacter obae

Species of bacterium

Achromobacter obae is a bacterium from the genus Achromobacter which contains the enzyme alpha-amino-epsilon-caprolactam racemase. The complete genome of A. obae has been sequenced.

== See also ==
- List of sequenced bacterial genomes
