= Castellaniella hirudinis =

Scientific classification
- Domain: Bacteria
- Kingdom: Pseudomonadati
- Phylum: Pseudomonadota
- Class: Betaproteobacteria
- Order: Burkholderiales
- Family: Alcaligenaceae
- Genus: Castellaniella
- Species: C. hirudinis

Binomial name
- Castellaniella hirudinis Glaeser et al. 2013

Type strain
- CCUG 62394, E103, LMG 26910

Species of bacterium

Castellaniella hirudinis is a Gram-negative, rod-shaped, non-spore-forming, bacterium from the genus Castellaniella, isolated from the skin of a juvenile medical leech (Hirudo verbana) in Biebertal, Germany.
