= Beta-Lytic metalloendopeptidase =

Beta-lytic metalloendopeptidase

Identifiers
- EC no.: 3.4.24.32
- CAS no.: 37288-92-9

Databases
- IntEnz: IntEnz view
- BRENDA: BRENDA entry
- ExPASy: NiceZyme view
- KEGG: KEGG entry
- MetaCyc: metabolic pathway
- PRIAM: profile
- PDB structures: RCSB PDB PDBe PDBsum
Search
- PMC: articles
- PubMed: articles
- NCBI: proteins

Beta-lytic metalloendopeptidase (EC 3.4.24.32, Myxobacter beta-lytic proteinase, achromopeptidase component, beta-lytic metalloproteinase, beta-lytic protease, Myxobacterium sorangium beta-lytic proteinase, Myxobacter^{495} beta-lytic proteinase) is an enzyme. This enzyme catalyses the following chemical reaction

Cleavage of N-acetylmuramoyl-Ala, and of the insulin B chain at Gly^{23}-Phe > Val^{18}-Cya

This enzyme is present in Achromobacter lyticus and Lysobacter enzymogenes.
