= Paenalcaligenes suwonensis =

Scientific classification
- Domain: Bacteria
- Kingdom: Pseudomonadati
- Phylum: Pseudomonadota
- Class: Betaproteobacteria
- Order: Burkholderiales
- Family: Alcaligenaceae
- Genus: Paenalcaligenes
- Species: P. suwonensis

Binomial name
- Paenalcaligenes suwonensis Moon et al. 2014

Type strain
- KACC 16537, NBRC 108927, ABC02-12

Species of bacterium

Paenalcaligenes suwonensis is a Gram-negative, aerobic and non-spore-forming bacterium from the genus Paenalcaligenes which has been isolated from mushroom compost.
