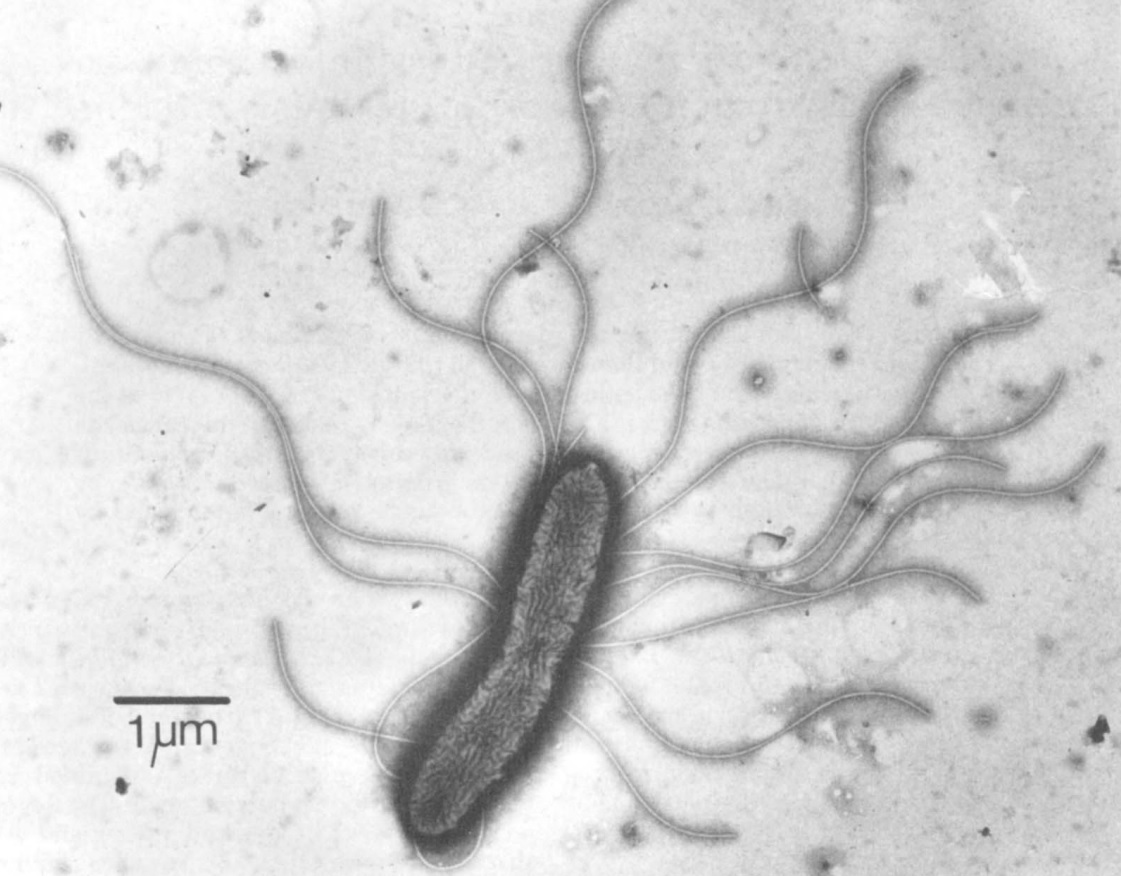

Scientific classification
- Domain: Bacteria
- Kingdom: Pseudomonadati
- Phylum: Pseudomonadota
- Class: Betaproteobacteria
- Order: Burkholderiales
- Family: Alcaligenaceae
- Genus: Achromobacter
- Species: A. ruhlandii

Binomial name
- Achromobacter ruhlandii Yabuuchi and Yano 1981 (non Achromobacter Bergey et al. 1923)

Synonyms
- Hydrogenomonas ruhlandii Packer and Vishniac 1955; Pseudomonas ruhlandii (Packer and Vishniac 1955) Davis et al. 1969; Alcaligenes ruhlandii (Packer and Vishniac 1955) Aragno and Schlegel 1977

= Achromobacter ruhlandii =

Species of bacterium

Achromobacter ruhlandii is a Gram-negative bacterium included in the order Burkholderiales.
