= Brackiella oedipodis =

Scientific classification
- Domain: Bacteria
- Kingdom: Pseudomonadati
- Phylum: Pseudomonadota
- Class: Betaproteobacteria
- Order: Burkholderiales
- Family: Alcaligenaceae
- Genus: Brackiella
- Species: B. oedipodis

Binomial name
- Brackiella oedipodis Willems et al. 2002

Type strain
- CCUG 47103, CIP 107426, DSM 13743, LGM 19451T, LMG 19451, NCIMB 13739, R-8845, R-8846, Reissbrodt RKI 97-01984, RKI99-01984, Willems R-8845, Willems R-8846

Species of bacterium

Brackiella oedipodis is a Gram-negative, oxidase- and catalase-positive, rod-shaped, nonmotile, chemoorganotrophic bacterium of the genus Brackiella isolated from the heart of a cotton-topped tamarin Saguinus oedipus. It can cause endocarditis. Colonies of Brackiella oedipodis are greyish-white coloured.
