= Pelistega europaea =

Scientific classification
- Domain: Bacteria
- Kingdom: Pseudomonadati
- Phylum: Pseudomonadota
- Class: Betaproteobacteria
- Order: Burkholderiales
- Family: Alcaligenaceae
- Genus: Pelistega
- Species: P. europaea

Binomial name
- Pelistega europaea Vandamme et al. 1998

Type strain
- ATCC 700725, CCUG 39967, CIP 105809, CIP 105842, Hommez N57, LMG 10982, N57

Species of bacterium

Pelistega europaea is a gram-negative, aerobic bacterium from the genus Pelistega which can cause respiratory disease in pigeons.
