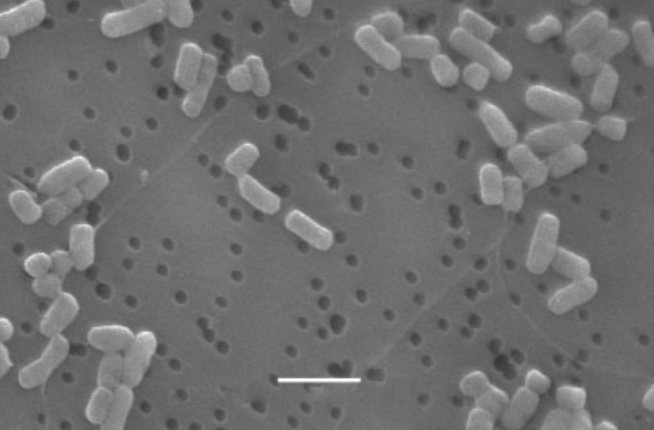

Scientific classification
- Domain: Bacteria
- Kingdom: Pseudomonadati
- Phylum: Pseudomonadota
- Class: Betaproteobacteria
- Order: Burkholderiales
- Family: Alcaligenaceae
- Genus: Kerstersia
- Species: K. similis

Binomial name
- Kerstersia similis Vandamme et al. 2012

Type strain
- API 145-2-84, CCUG 46999, Gilardi 4528, LMG 5890

= Kerstersia similis =

Species of bacterium

Kerstersia similis is species of gram-negative bacterium of the genus of Kerstersia which was isolated from human clinical samples.
