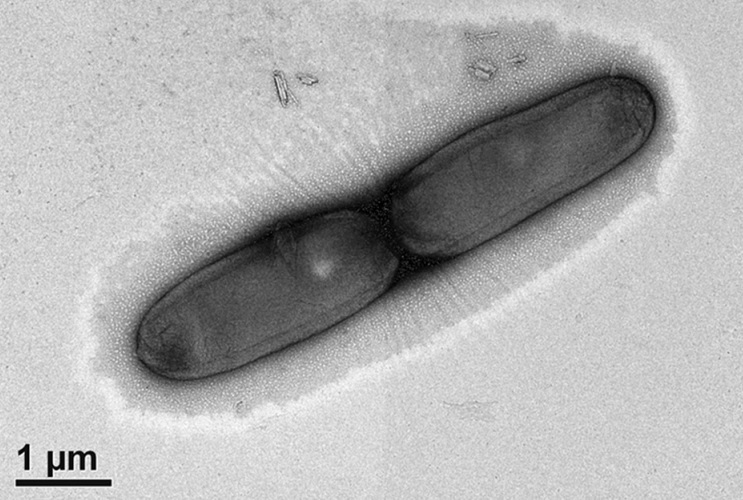

Scientific classification
- Domain: Bacteria
- Kingdom: Pseudomonadati
- Phylum: Pseudomonadota
- Class: Betaproteobacteria
- Order: Burkholderiales
- Family: Alcaligenaceae
- Genus: Castellaniella
- Species: C. fermenti

Binomial name
- Castellaniella fermenti Lin et al. 2018

Type strain
- BCRC 81023, JCM 31755, CC-YTH191

= Castellaniella fermenti =

Species of bacterium

Castellaniella fermenti is a Gram-negative and aerobic bacterium from the genus Castellaniella which has been isolated from fermented food from Taiwan.
