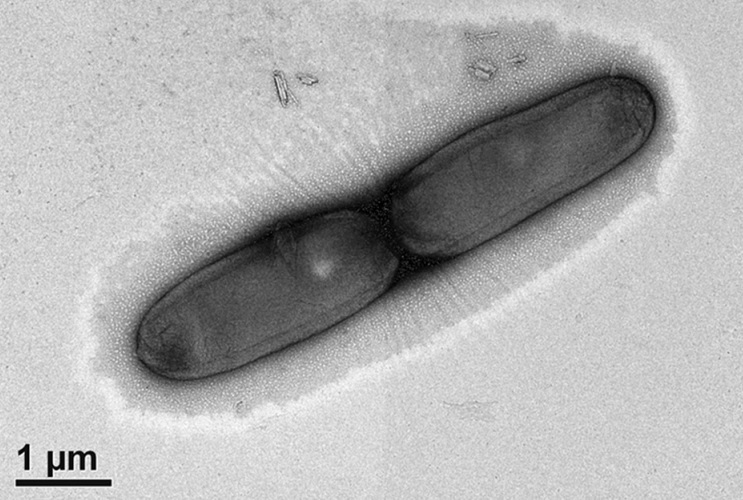
- Castellaniella fermenti

Scientific classification
- Domain: Bacteria
- Kingdom: Pseudomonadati
- Phylum: Pseudomonadota
- Class: Betaproteobacteria
- Order: Burkholderiales
- Family: Alcaligenaceae
- Genus: Castellaniella; Kämpfer et al. 2006

Type species
- Castellaniella defragrans

Species
- Castellaniella caeni Castellaniella daejeonensis Castellaniella defragrans Castellaniella denitrificans Castellaniella fermenti Castellaniella ginsengisoli Castellaniella hirudinis

= Castellaniella =

Genus of bacteria

Castellaniella is a genus of gram-negative, facultatively anaerobic, motile bacteria from the family Alcaligenaceae.
