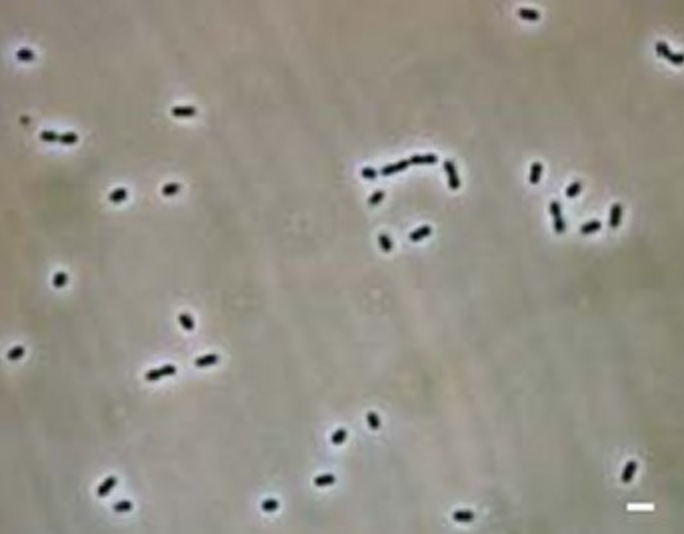

Scientific classification
- Domain: Bacteria
- Kingdom: Pseudomonadati
- Phylum: Pseudomonadota
- Class: Betaproteobacteria
- Order: Burkholderiales
- Family: Alcaligenaceae
- Genus: Advenella
- Species: A. mimigardefordensis

Binomial name
- Advenella mimigardefordensis (Wübbeler et al. 2006) Gibello et al. 2009

Type strain
- DPN7, DSM 17166, LMG 22922, Vandamme R-24677, Wübbeler DPN7

Synonyms
- Tetrathiobacter mimigardefordensis

= Advenella mimigardefordensis =

Species of bacterium

Advenella mimigardefordensis is a bacterium from the genus Advenella. The complete genome of A. mimigardefordensis strain DPN7 has been sequenced. Tetrathiobacter mimigardefordensis has been reclassified to A. mimigardefordensis. A. mimigardefordensis SM421 has antimicrobial activity against Enterococcus faecalis.
