= Taurine—2-oxoglutarate transaminase =

Taurine-2-oxoglutarate transaminase

Identifiers
- EC no.: 2.6.1.55
- CAS no.: 9076-52-2

Databases
- IntEnz: IntEnz view
- BRENDA: BRENDA entry
- ExPASy: NiceZyme view
- KEGG: KEGG entry
- MetaCyc: metabolic pathway
- PRIAM: profile
- PDB structures: RCSB PDB PDBe PDBsum
- Gene Ontology: AmiGO / QuickGO
Search
- PMC: articles
- PubMed: articles
- NCBI: proteins

Taurine-2-oxoglutarate transaminase (EC 2.6.1.55) is a pyridoxal phosphate-dependent enzyme that catalyzes the chemical reaction.

taurine
+
α-ketoglutaric acid
sulfoacetaldehyde
+
L-glutamic acid

The two substrates of this enzyme characterised from Achromobacter superficialis are taurine and α-ketoglutaric acid. Its products are sulfoacetaldehyde and L-glutamic acid.

This enzyme is a transferase, specifically a transaminase, which transfer nitrogenous groups. The systematic name of this enzyme class is taurine:2-oxoglutarate aminotransferase. Other names in common use include taurine aminotransferase, taurine transaminase, taurine-alpha-ketoglutarate aminotransferase, and taurine-glutamate transaminase. It participates in beta-alanine metabolism.
