= Derxia lacustris =

Scientific classification
- Domain: Bacteria
- Kingdom: Pseudomonadati
- Phylum: Pseudomonadota
- Class: Betaproteobacteria
- Order: Burkholderiales
- Family: Alcaligenaceae
- Genus: Derxia
- Species: D. lacustris

Binomial name
- Derxia lacustris Chen et al. 2013

Type strain
- BCRC 80208, HL-12, KCTC 23311

Species of bacterium

Derxia lacustris is a Gram-negative, nitrogen-fixing, aerobic, motile bacterium of the genus Derxia, isolated from a freshwater lake in Taiwan.
