= Advenella kashmirensis =

Scientific classification
- Domain: Bacteria
- Kingdom: Pseudomonadati
- Phylum: Pseudomonadota
- Class: Betaproteobacteria
- Order: Burkholderiales
- Family: Alcaligenaceae
- Genus: Advenella
- Species: A. kashmirensis

Binomial name
- Advenella kashmirensis (Ghosh et al. 2005) Gibello et al. 2009

Type strain
- DSM 17095, LMG 22695, LMG 22965, MTCC 7002, Roy WT001, WT001

Synonyms
- Tetrathiobacter kashmirensis

Species of bacterium

Advenella kashmirensis is a chemolithotrophic, mesophilic, neutrophilic, tetrathionate-oxidizing bacterium of the genus Advenella, isolated from the soil of a temperate orchard in Jammu and Kashmir in India. Tetrathiobacter kashmirensis has been reclassified to Advenella kashmirensis. The complete genome of A. kashmirensis has been sequenced.

== See also ==
- List of sequenced bacterial genomes
