= Pigmentiphaga kullae =

Scientific classification
- Domain: Bacteria
- Kingdom: Pseudomonadati
- Phylum: Pseudomonadota
- Class: Betaproteobacteria
- Order: Burkholderiales
- Family: Alcaligenaceae
- Genus: Pigmentiphaga
- Species: P. kullae

Binomial name
- Pigmentiphaga kullae Blümel et al. 2001

Type strain
- ATCC BAA-795, ATCCBAA-795, CCUG 47266, CIP 108234, DSM 13608, K24, LMG 21665, NCIMB 13708

Species of bacterium

Pigmentiphaga kullae is a gram-negative, oxidase and catalase-positive, non-spore-forming, rod-shaped bacterium from the genus of Pigmentiphaga which has the ability to decolorize the azo dyes-compound 1-(4'-carboxyphenylazo)-4-naphthol aerobically and uses it as a sole source of carbon and energy.
