= Castellaniella caeni =

Scientific classification
- Domain: Bacteria
- Kingdom: Pseudomonadati
- Phylum: Pseudomonadota
- Class: Betaproteobacteria
- Order: Burkholderiales
- Family: Alcaligenaceae
- Genus: Castellaniella
- Species: C. caeni

Binomial name
- Castellaniella caeni Liu et al. 2008

Type strain
- Ho-11, KCTC 12197, Lee Ho-11, LMG 23411

Species of bacterium

Castellaniella caeni is a Gram-negative, oxidase-positive, catalase-negative, facultatively anaerobic, denitrifying, nonmotile bacterium from the family Alcaligenaceae, isolated from the sludge of the aerobic treatment tanks of a municipal leachate treatment plant in Daejeon in the Republic of Korea.
