= Achromobacter piechaudii =

Scientific classification
- Domain: Bacteria
- Kingdom: Pseudomonadati
- Phylum: Pseudomonadota
- Class: Betaproteobacteria
- Order: Burkholderiales
- Family: Alcaligenaceae
- Genus: Achromobacter
- Species: A. piechaudii

Binomial name
- Achromobacter piechaudii Yabuuchi et al. 1998

Type strain
- ATCC 43552, CCM 2986, CCUG 724, CIP 60.75, CIP 6075, DSM 10342, Hugh 366-5, IAM 12591, JCM 20668, LMG 1873, MK 082, NBIMCC 557, NBRC 102461, NCTC 11970

Species of bacterium

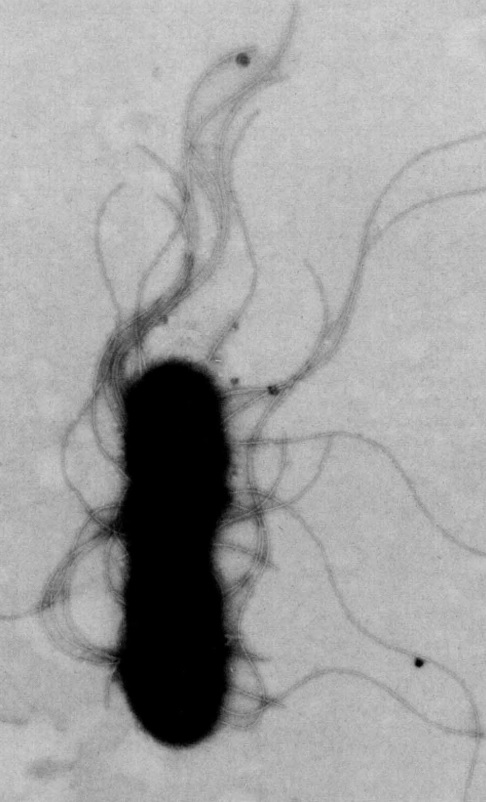
Achromobacter piechaudii

Achromobacter piechaudii is a Gram-negative, aerobic, oxidase-positive, rod-shaped, motile bacterium from the genus Achromobacter. The complete genome of A. piechaudii has been sequenced.

== See also ==
- List of sequenced bacterial genomes
