= Achromobacter clevelandea =

Scientific classification
- Domain: Bacteria
- Kingdom: Pseudomonadati
- Phylum: Pseudomonadota
- Class: Betaproteobacteria
- Order: Burkholderiales
- Family: Alcaligenaceae
- Genus: Achromobacter
- Species: A. clevelandea

Binomial name
- Achromobacter clevelandea Pattanathu Rahman 2004

Type strain
- PR292BT

Species of bacterium

Achromobacter clevelandea is a bacterium from the genus Achromobacter isolated from iron-rich sediment in Cleveland in the United Kingdom.
