= Castellaniella daejeonensis =

Scientific classification
- Domain: Bacteria
- Kingdom: Pseudomonadati
- Phylum: Pseudomonadota
- Class: Betaproteobacteria
- Order: Burkholderiales
- Family: Alcaligenaceae
- Genus: Castellaniella
- Species: C. daejeonensis

Binomial name
- Castellaniella daejeonensis Lee et al. 2010

Type strain
- JCM 16240, KCTC 22454, MJ06

Species of bacterium

Castellaniella daejeonensis is a Gram-negative, oxidase and catalase-positive, facultatively anaerobic, non-spore-forming, motile bacterium from the family Alcaligenaceae, isolated from oil-contaminated soil.
