= Paenalcaligenes hominis =

Scientific classification
- Domain: Bacteria
- Kingdom: Pseudomonadati
- Phylum: Pseudomonadota
- Class: Betaproteobacteria
- Order: Burkholderiales
- Family: Alcaligenaceae
- Genus: Paenalcaligenes
- Species: P. hominis

Binomial name
- Paenalcaligenes hominis Kämpfer et al. 2010

Type strain
- CCM 7698, CCUG 53761, CCUG 53761A

Species of bacterium

Paenalcaligenes hominis is a species of gram-negative bacterium from the genus Paenalcaligenes which has been isolated from human blood in Gothenburg in Sweden.
