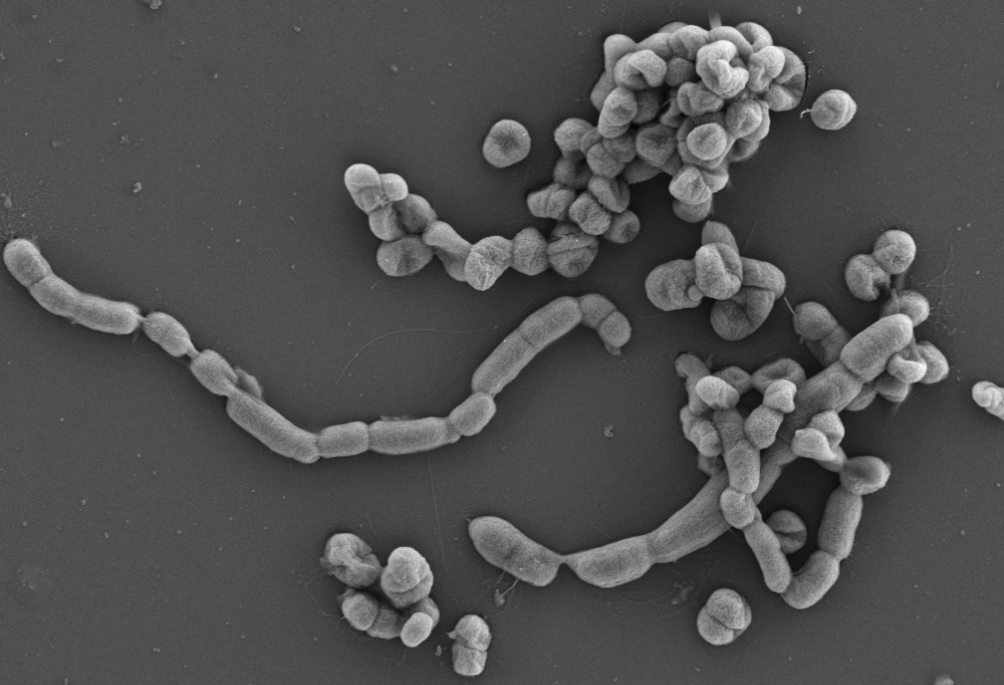
- Oligella ureolytica.jpg

Scientific classification
- Domain: Bacteria
- Kingdom: Pseudomonadati
- Phylum: Pseudomonadota
- Class: Betaproteobacteria
- Order: Burkholderiales
- Family: Alcaligenaceae
- Genus: Oligella
- Species: O. ureolytica

Binomial name
- Oligella ureolytica Rossau et al. 1987

Type strain
- ATCC 43534, CCM 4583, CCUG 1465, CDC C379, CIP 103114, DSM 18253, LMG 3505, LMG 6519, NCTC 11997

= Oligella ureolytica =

Species of bacterium

Oligella ureolytica is a Gram-negative, aerobic, motile bacterium with peritrichous flagella of the genus Oligella, isolated from a cervical lymph node and human urine.
