= Achromobacter spanius =

Scientific classification
- Domain: Bacteria
- Kingdom: Pseudomonadati
- Phylum: Pseudomonadota
- Class: Betaproteobacteria
- Order: Burkholderiales
- Family: Alcaligenaceae
- Genus: Achromobacter
- Species: A. spanius

Binomial name
- Achromobacter spanius Coenye et al. 2003

Type strain
- CCUG 47062, LMG 5911, API 198-2-84

Species of bacterium

Achromobacter spanius is a Gram-negative, oxidase- and catalase-positive, rod-shaped bacterium from the genus Achromobacter isolated from various human clinical samples.
