= Paenalcaligenes hermetiae =

Scientific classification
- Domain: Bacteria
- Kingdom: Pseudomonadati
- Phylum: Pseudomonadota
- Class: Betaproteobacteria
- Order: Burkholderiales
- Family: Alcaligenaceae
- Genus: Paenalcaligenes
- Species: P. hermetiae

Binomial name
- Paenalcaligenes hermetiae Lee et al. 2013

Type strain
- JCM 18423, KACC 16840, KBL009

Species of bacterium

Paenalcaligenes hermetiae is a Gram-negative, facultatively anaerobic, short rod-shaped and non-motile bacterium from the genus Paenalcaligenes which has been isolated from the gut of the larva Hermetia illucens.
