= Advenella faeciporci =

Scientific classification
- Domain: Bacteria
- Kingdom: Pseudomonadati
- Phylum: Pseudomonadota
- Class: Betaproteobacteria
- Order: Burkholderiales
- Family: Alcaligenaceae
- Genus: Advenella
- Species: Advenella faeciporci

Binomial name
- Advenella faeciporci Matsuoka et al. 2012

Type strain
- JCM 17746, KCTC 23732, M-07

Species of bacterium

Advenella faeciporci is a nitrite-denitrifying bacterium from the genus Advenella which was isolated from piggery wastewater.
