= Pigmentiphaga soli =

Scientific classification
- Domain: Bacteria
- Kingdom: Pseudomonadati
- Phylum: Pseudomonadota
- Class: Betaproteobacteria
- Order: Burkholderiales
- Family: Alcaligenaceae
- Genus: Pigmentiphaga
- Species: P. soli

Binomial name
- Pigmentiphaga soli Lee et al. 2011

Species of bacterium

Pigmentiphaga soli is a gram-negative, motile bacterium from the genus Pigmentiphaga, which was isolated from soil in South Korea.
