= Pigmentiphaga daeguensis =

Scientific classification
- Domain: Bacteria
- Kingdom: Pseudomonadati
- Phylum: Pseudomonadota
- Class: Betaproteobacteria
- Order: Burkholderiales
- Family: Alcaligenaceae
- Genus: Pigmentiphaga
- Species: P. daeguensis

Binomial name
- Pigmentiphaga daeguensis Yoon et al. 2007

Type strain
- JCM 14330, K110, KCTC 12838

Species of bacterium

Pigmentiphaga daeguensis is a gram-negative, non-spore-forming, rod-shaped, non-motile bacterium from the genus Pigmentiphaga, which was isolated from wastewater of a dye works in Daegu in South Korea
