= Achromobacter cholinophagum =

Scientific classification
- Domain: Bacteria
- Kingdom: Pseudomonadati
- Phylum: Pseudomonadota
- Class: Betaproteobacteria
- Order: Burkholderiales
- Family: Alcaligenaceae
- Genus: Achromobacter
- Species: A. cholinophagum

Binomial name
- Achromobacter cholinophagum

Type strain
- ATCC 15918, IAM 12568, LMG 3504, NBRC 102400, NCIMB 1501, NCMB 1501

Species of bacterium

Achromobacter cholinophagum is a Gram-negative bacterium of the genus Achromobacter.
