= Basilea psittacipulmonis =

Scientific classification
- Domain: Bacteria
- Kingdom: Pseudomonadati
- Phylum: Pseudomonadota
- Class: Betaproteobacteria
- Order: Burkholderiales
- Family: Alcaligenaceae
- Genus: Basilea
- Species: B. psittacipulmonis

Binomial name
- Basilea psittacipulmonis Whiteson et al. 2014

Type strain
- CIP 110308, DSM 24701, DSM 24791

Species of bacterium

Basilea psittacipulmonis is a Gram-negative, rod-shaped and non-motile bacterium from the genus Basile which has been isolated from the lung of the parakeet Melopsittacus undulatus in Basel in Switzerland. Since 1929, the study of parakeet respiratory infection has had crucial implications for biomedical research. The genome of a bacterium isolated from the lungs of a dead parakeet in captivity was sequenced using Illumina dye sequencing. The Basilea psittacipulmonis’ nearly complete genome sequence is obtained through the assembly of short sequence reads. Bacterial species identified by rpoB gene sequences were nucleotides. Comparison of gene sequences revealed that the most similar species is Pelisega europaea. Its growth temperature is between 30-37 degrees celsius.
