= Castellaniella defragrans =

Scientific classification
- Domain: Bacteria
- Kingdom: Pseudomonadati
- Phylum: Pseudomonadota
- Class: Betaproteobacteria
- Order: Burkholderiales
- Family: Alcaligenaceae
- Genus: Castellaniella
- Species: C. defragrans

Binomial name
- Castellaniella defragrans (Foss et al. 1998) Kämpfer et al. 2006

Type strain
- 54Pin, CCUG 39790, CIP 105602, DSM 12141, Harder 54Pin, KACC 10890, KCTC 12149, LMD 98.75, LMG 18538, NCCB 98075

Synonyms
- Alcaligenes defragrans Foss et al. 1998

Species of bacterium

Castellaniella defragrans is a Gram-negative, oxidase- and catalase-positive, strictly aerobic, motile bacterium from the family Alcaligenaceae.
