= Kerstersia gyiorum =

Scientific classification
- Domain: Bacteria
- Kingdom: Pseudomonadati
- Phylum: Pseudomonadota
- Class: Betaproteobacteria
- Order: Burkholderiales
- Family: Alcaligenaceae
- Genus: Kerstersia
- Species: K. gyiorum

Binomial name
- Kerstersia gyiorum Coenye et al. 2003

Type strain
- API 184-2-84, CCM 7184, CCUG 47000, CIP 108214, Coenye R-20010, DSM 16618, Gilardi 3925, LMG 5906

Species of bacterium

Kerstersia gyiorum is a Gram-negative, catalase-positive, oxidase-negative, bacterium of the genus Kerstersia, isolated from various human clinical samples. Rare cases of bacteremia due to K. gyiorum have been reported.
