= Pigmentiphaga litoralis =

Scientific classification
- Domain: Bacteria
- Kingdom: Pseudomonadati
- Phylum: Pseudomonadota
- Class: Betaproteobacteria
- Order: Burkholderiales
- Family: Alcaligenaceae
- Genus: Pigmentiphaga
- Species: P. litoralis

Binomial name
- Pigmentiphaga litoralis Chen et al. 2009

Type strain
- CCTCC AA207034, JSM 061001, KCTC 22165

Species of bacterium

Pigmentiphaga litoralis is a gram-negative, oxidase and catalase-positive, facultatively anaerobic non-spore-forming, non-motile, rod-shaped bacterium from the genus Pigmentiphaga, which was isolated from a tidal flat sediment in the South China Sea in China. Colonies of P. litoralis are yellow colored.
