= Achromobacter cycloclastes =

Scientific classification
- Domain: Bacteria
- Kingdom: Pseudomonadati
- Phylum: Pseudomonadota
- Class: Betaproteobacteria
- Order: Burkholderiales
- Family: Alcaligenaceae
- Genus: Achromobacter
- Species: A. cycloclastes

Binomial name
- Achromobacter cycloclastes Bergey et al.

Type strain
- An-17, ATCC 21921, BCRC 16036, CCRC 16036, CCTC La 2651, CCTM 2651, CECT 333, IAM 1013, IAW 152, IFM An-17, JCM 20009, KCTC 2947, LMG 1127, NBRC 102459

Species of bacterium

Achromobacter cycloclastes is a Gram-negative, aerobic bacterium from the genus Achromobacter. The complete genome of A. cycloclastes has been sequenced.

== See also ==
- List of sequenced bacterial genomes
