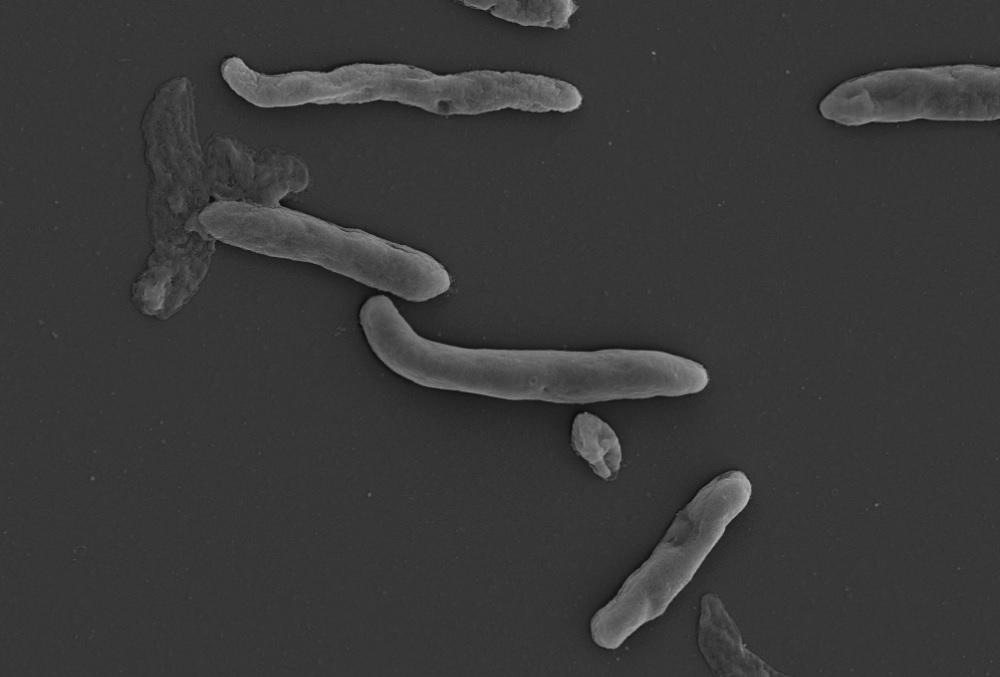

Scientific classification
- Domain: Bacteria
- Kingdom: Pseudomonadati
- Phylum: Pseudomonadota
- Class: Betaproteobacteria
- Order: Burkholderiales
- Family: Alcaligenaceae
- Genus: Derxia
- Species: D. gummosa

Binomial name
- Derxia gummosa Jensen et al. 1960

Type strain
- ATCC 15994, CCUG 51006, CECT 841, ATCC15994T, DSM 723, DSMZ 723, IAM 13946, JCM 20996, Jensen II, KCTC 1818, LMG 3977, NBRC 102506, NCIB 9064, NCIMB 9064, NRRL B-14655, NRRL B-4319, WR-231, WR-234

Synonyms
- Derxia indica

= Derxia gummosa =

Species of bacterium

Derxia gummosa is a Gram-negative, rod-shaped, nitrogen-fixing, obligate aerobe bacterium of the genus Derxia. Colonies of D. gummosa produce a tenacious gum.
