= Paralcaligenes ureilyticus =

Scientific classification
- Domain: Bacteria
- Kingdom: Pseudomonadati
- Phylum: Pseudomonadota
- Class: Betaproteobacteria
- Order: Burkholderiales
- Family: Alcaligenaceae
- Genus: Paralcaligenes
- Species: P. ureilyticus

Binomial name
- Paralcaligenes ureilyticus Kim et al. 2011

Type strain
- DSM 24591, GR24-5, KACC 13888

Species of bacterium

Paralcaligenes ureilyticus is a Gram-negative, non-spore-forming, strictly aerobic and motile bacterium from the genus Paralcaligenes which has been isolated from soil from a ginseng field in Korea.
