= Advenella incenata =

Scientific classification
- Domain: Bacteria
- Kingdom: Pseudomonadati
- Phylum: Pseudomonadota
- Class: Betaproteobacteria
- Order: Burkholderiales
- Family: Alcaligenaceae
- Genus: Advenella
- Species: A. incenata

Binomial name
- Advenella incenata Coenye et al. 2005

Type strain
- CCUG 45225, CIP 108657, Coenye R-20009, LMG 22250

Species of bacterium

Advenella incenata is a Gram-negative, oxidase- and catalase-positive, rod-shaped bacterium from the family Alcaligenaceae. Colonies of A. incenata are light brown in color.
