= Oligella urethralis =

Scientific classification
- Domain: Bacteria
- Kingdom: Pseudomonadati
- Phylum: Pseudomonadota
- Class: Betaproteobacteria
- Order: Burkholderiales
- Family: Alcaligenaceae
- Genus: Oligella
- Species: O. urethralis

Binomial name
- Oligella urethralis Rossau et al. 1987

Type strain
- ATCC 17960, CCUG 13463, CCUG 16463T, CCUG 37823, CDC 7603, CDC C7603, CIP 103116, DSM 7531, GIFU 3187, IAM 13553, IFO 14589, JCM 20913, LMG 1015, LMG 5303, MC213, MC213 MC213, NBRC 14589, NCDC 744, NCDC KC744, NCDCKC744, NCIMB 13140, NCTC 12964, NCTC 744, USCC 1441

Species of bacterium

Oligella urethralis is a Gram-negative, oxidase-positive, nonfermentative bacterium of the genus Oligella (first known under Moraxella urethralis) which can cause urosepsis.
