= Candidimonas humi =

Scientific classification
- Domain: Bacteria
- Kingdom: Pseudomonadati
- Phylum: Pseudomonadota
- Class: Betaproteobacteria
- Order: Burkholderiales
- Family: Alcaligenaceae
- Genus: Candidimonas
- Species: C. humi

Binomial name
- Candidimonas humi Vaz-Moreira et al. 2011

Type strain
- CCUG 55807, LMG 24813, SC-092

Synonyms
- Candidimonas humica

Species of bacterium

Candidimonas humi is a Gram-negative bacterium from the genus Candidimonas which has been isolated from sewage sludge in Portugal.
