= Achromobacter insolitus =

Scientific classification
- Domain: Bacteria
- Kingdom: Pseudomonadati
- Phylum: Pseudomonadota
- Class: Betaproteobacteria
- Order: Burkholderiales
- Family: Alcaligenaceae
- Genus: Achromobacter
- Species: A. insolitus

Binomial name
- Achromobacter insolitus Coenye et al. 2003

Type strain
- API 201-3-84, API 201-384, CCM 7182, CCUG 47057, CIP 108202, G. Gilardi 3038, Gilardi 3038, LMG 6003

Species of bacterium

Achromobacter insolitus is a Gram-negative, oxidase- and catalase-positive bacterium from the genus Achromobacter which was isolated from various human clinical samples.
