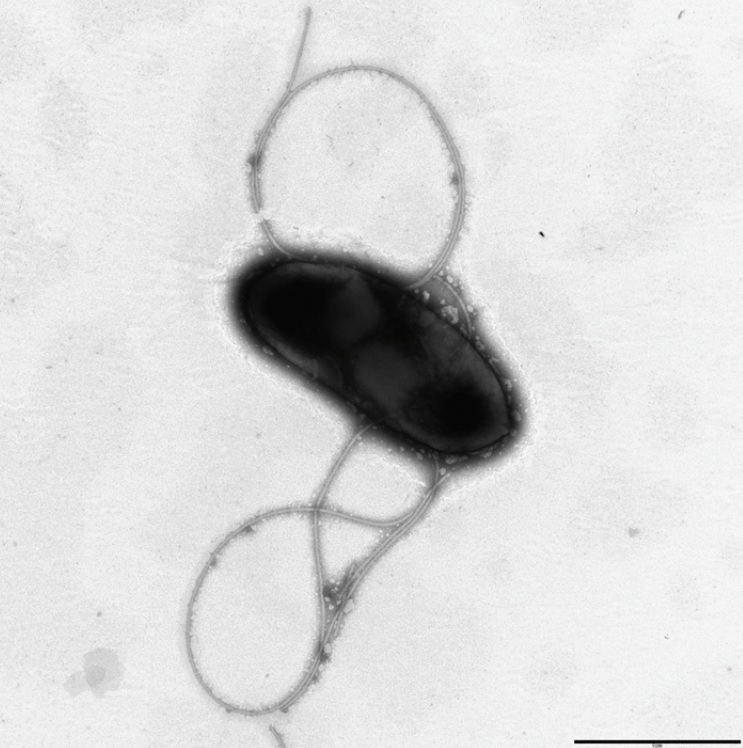
- Optical microscope image of Candidimonas bauzanensis

Scientific classification
- Domain: Bacteria
- Kingdom: Pseudomonadati
- Phylum: Pseudomonadota
- Class: Betaproteobacteria
- Order: Burkholderiales
- Family: Alcaligenaceae
- Genus: Candidimonas
- Species: C. bauzanensis

Binomial name
- Candidimonas bauzanensis Zhang et al. 2012

Type strain
- CGMCC 1.10190, DSM 22805, LMG 26046

= Candidimonas bauzanensis =

Species of bacterium

Candidimonas bauzanensis is a Gram-negative, facultatively anaerobic, psychrophilic and motile bacterium from the genus Candidimonas which has been isolated from soil from Bozen in Italy.
