= Achromobacter arsenitoxydans =

Scientific classification
- Domain: Bacteria
- Kingdom: Pseudomonadati
- Phylum: Pseudomonadota
- Class: Betaproteobacteria
- Order: Burkholderiales
- Family: Alcaligenaceae
- Genus: Achromobacter
- Species: A. arsenitoxydans

Binomial name
- Achromobacter arsenitoxydans

Species of bacterium

Achromobacter arsenitoxydans is a Gram-negative, strictly aerobic, rod-shaped bacterium from the genus Achromobacter which was isolated from soil of an arsenic-contaminated pig farm. Achromobacter arsenitoxydans has the ability to oxidize arsenite to arsenate. The complete genome of A. arsenitoxydans has been sequenced.

== See also ==
- List of sequenced bacterial genomes
