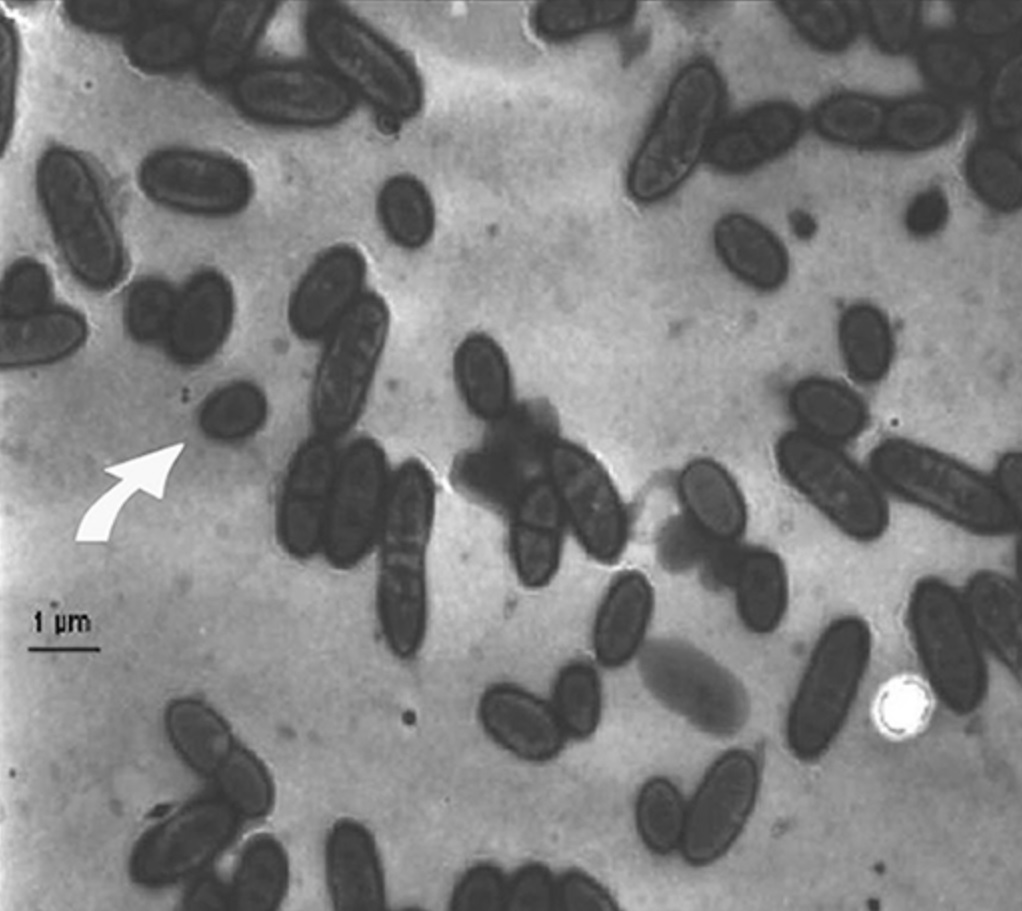
- Achromobacter marplatensis

Scientific classification
- Domain: Bacteria
- Kingdom: Pseudomonadati
- Phylum: Pseudomonadota
- Class: Betaproteobacteria
- Order: Burkholderiales
- Family: Alcaligenaceae
- Genus: Achromobacter
- Species: A. marplatensis

Binomial name
- Achromobacter marplatensis Gomila et al. 2011

Type strain
- CCM 7608, CCUG 56371, CECT 7342, LMG 26219, Murialdo B2, strain B2

= Achromobacter marplatensis =

Species of bacterium

Achromobacter marplatensis is a Gram-negative bacterium from the genus Achromobacter which was isolated from a pentachlorophenol-contaminated soil in Mar del Plata by Murialdo et al.
