= Oligella =

Oligella may refer to:

- Oligella (beetle), a genus of beetles in the family Ptiliidae
- Oligella (bacterium), a genus of bacteria in the family Burkholderiaceae
