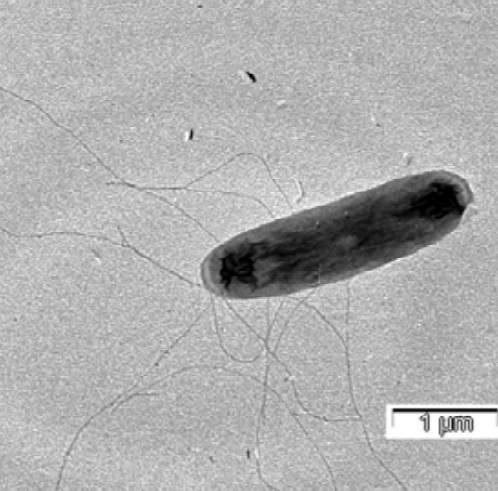
- Castellaniella ginsengisoli bacterium as seen under an electron microscope

Scientific classification
- Domain: Bacteria
- Kingdom: Pseudomonadati
- Phylum: Pseudomonadota
- Class: Betaproteobacteria
- Order: Burkholderiales
- Family: Alcaligenaceae
- Genus: Castellaniella
- Species: C. ginsengisoli

Binomial name
- Castellaniella ginsengisoli Kim et al. 2009

Type strain
- DCY36, JCM 15515, KCTC 22398

= Castellaniella ginsengisoli =

Species of bacterium

Castellaniella ginsengisoli is a Gram-negative, oxidase- and catalase-positive, rod-shaped, motile, beta-glucosidase-producing bacterium from the family Alcaligenaceae which has been isolated from soil of a ginseng field in South Korea. Colonies of Castellaniella ginsengisoli are yellow coloured.
