= Sejal Saglani =

British medical researcher

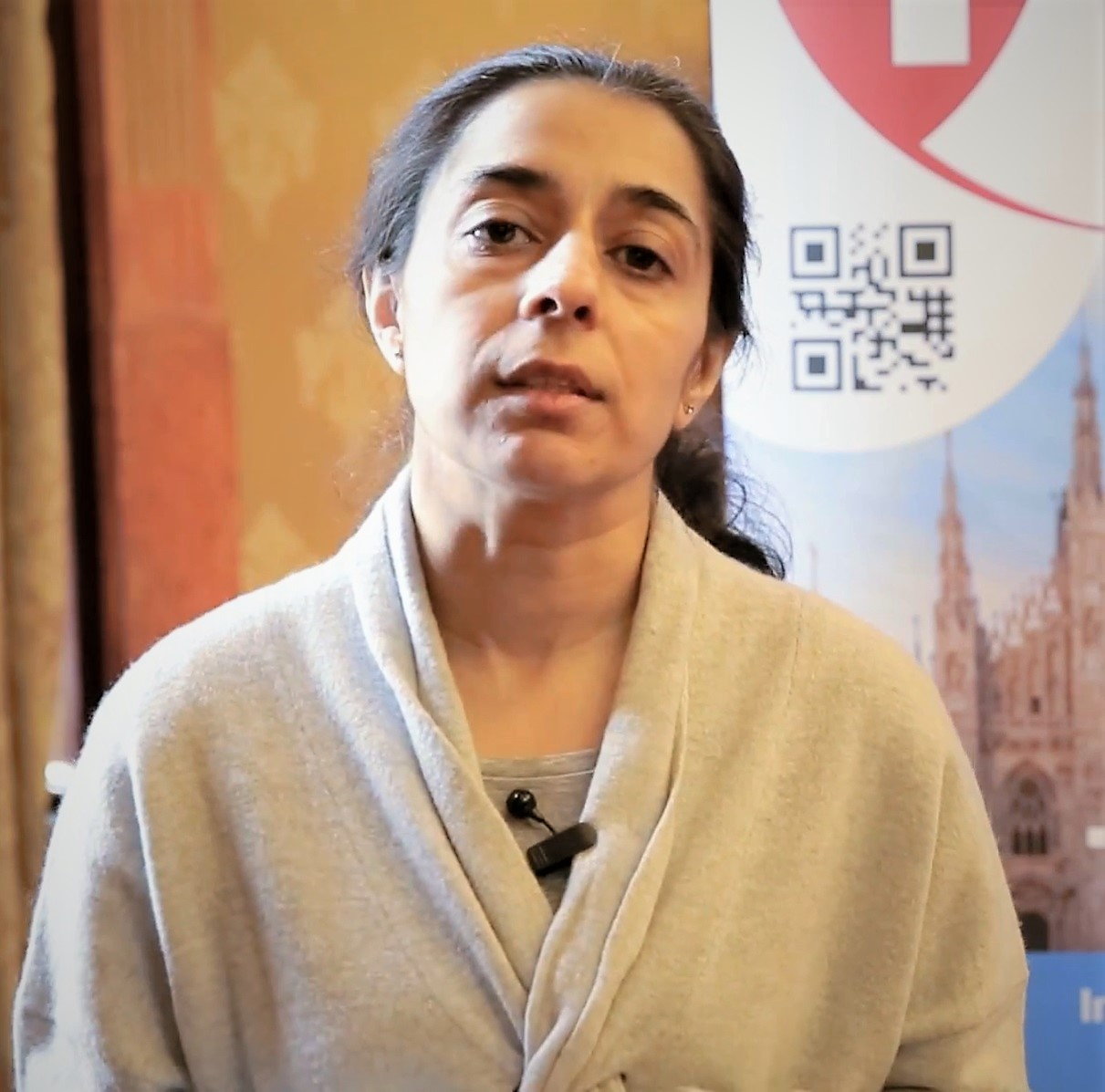
- Saglani in 2016
- Education: National Heart and Lung Institute; University of Leicester
- Scientific career
- Workplaces: National Heart and Lung Institute; Royal Brompton Hospital
- Thesis: The pathology of infant and preschool wheeze (2006)

Sejal Saglani is a British medical researcher who is Professor and Head of the Inflammation, Repair and Development Section at the National Heart and Lung Institute. Her research considers wheeze and severe childhood asthma. She serves as an Honorary Consultant in Paediatric Respiratory Medicine at the Royal Brompton Hospital.

== Early life and education ==
Saglani earned her undergraduate degree in medicine at the University of Leicester. She completed her specialist training in the Thames Valley in respiratory medicine, with a focus on paediatrics. She moved to the National Heart and Lung Institute (NHLI) for her graduate studies, where she investigated severe infant and pre-school wheeze. She was awarded the NHLI thesis prize for her doctorate.

== Research and career ==
Saglani was awarded a British Lung Foundation Fellowship to develop a model of allergic asthma. Once she had established the model, she was awarded a Wellcome Trust Fellowship to study the pathophysiological abnormalities of asthma, which impacts 1 in 10 children in the United Kingdom.

In 2018, Saglani became Head of the Inflammation, Repair and Development (IRD) section at the NHLI. At the NHLI, she continued to study pre-school wheeze and childhood severe asthma. To better understand respiratory disease, she makes use of airway samples from children, as well as neonatal mouse models. By treating newborn mice with farmyard microbes (Acinetobacter lwoffii), Saglani demonstrated that early interventions in children with asthma could reduce their respiratory conditions and prevent them from developing abnormal lung function later in life. She showed that this occurs because mice treated with Acinetobacter Iwoffii have reduced levels of Interleukin 13, an inflammatory marker produced by their T cells, which protected them from airway hyper-responsiveness. This indicated that the bacteria lessen inflammatory pathways. Her studies also indicated that younger mice had more active T-cells, which can result in increased wheeze. The immune response of mice that had been exposed to Acinetobacter Iwoffii (and therefore prepared to produce Interleukin 13) was amplified compared to their non-exposed counterparts. She serves as an Honorary Consultant in Paediatric Respiratory Medicine at the Royal Brompton Hospital.

== Awards and honours ==
- European Respiratory Society Young Investigator Award for Paediatric Research
- European Respiratory Society Romain Pauwels Award for Translational Asthma Research
- International Klosterfrau Award for Childhood Asthma
- Elected Fellow of the Academy of Medical Sciences (2025)

== Selected publications ==
- Sejal Saglani; Donald N Payne; Jie Zhu; Zhuo Wang; Andrew G Nicholson; Andrew Bush; Peter K Jeffery (16 August 2007). "Early detection of airway wall remodeling and eosinophilic inflammation in preschool wheezers". American Journal of Respiratory and Critical Care Medicine. 176 (9): 858–864. doi:10.1164/rccm.200702-212oc. ISSN 1073-449X. PMID 17702968. Wikidata Q80804699.
- Sejal Saglani; Kristiina Malmström; Anna S Pelkonen; et al. (18 January 2005). "Airway remodeling and inflammation in symptomatic infants with reversible airflow obstruction". American Journal of Respiratory and Critical Care Medicine. 171 (7): 722–727. doi:10.1164/rccm.200410-1404oc. ISSN 1073-449X. PMID 15657459. Wikidata Q81290306.
- Eva S Gollwitzer; Sejal Saglani; Aurélien Trompette; et al. (11 May 2014). "Lung microbiota promotes tolerance to allergens in neonates via PD-L1". Nature medicine. 20 (6): 642–647. doi:10.1038/nm.3568. ISSN 1078-8956. PMID 24813249. Wikidata Q35165937.
