= Kerstersia =

Scientific classification
- Domain: Bacteria
- Kingdom: Pseudomonadati
- Phylum: Pseudomonadota
- Class: Betaproteobacteria
- Order: Burkholderiales
- Family: Alcaligenaceae
- Genus: Kerstersia; Coenye et al. 2003

Type species
- Kerstersia gyiorum

Species
- K. gyiorum K. similis

Genus of bacteria

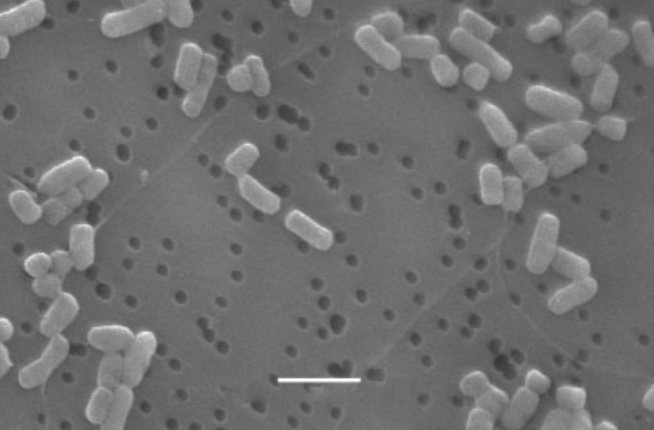
Kerstersia similis

Kerstersia is a genus of Gram-negative, catalase-positive, oxidase-negative bacteria from the family of Alcaligenaceae.

The genus contains two species, K. gyiorum and K. similis.
