= Lysyl endopeptidase =

Lysyl endopeptidase (R)

Identifiers
- EC no.: 3.4.21.50
- CAS no.: 123175-82-6

Databases
- IntEnz: IntEnz view
- BRENDA: BRENDA entry
- ExPASy: NiceZyme view
- KEGG: KEGG entry
- MetaCyc: metabolic pathway
- PRIAM: profile
- PDB structures: RCSB PDB PDBe PDBsum
Search
- PMC: articles
- PubMed: articles
- NCBI: proteins

Lysyl endopeptidase (EC 3.4.21.50, Achromobacter proteinase I, Achromobacter lyticus alkaline proteinase I, protease I, achromopeptidase, lysyl bond specific proteinase, and caseinase) is an enzyme. This enzyme catalyses the following chemical reaction

Preferential cleavage: Lys-, including -Lys-Pro-

This enzyme is isolated from Lysobacter enzymogenes.

It is produced by the human body and by Achromobacter lyticus that can help break down the protein casein in milk into smaller peptides and amino acids.
