= Orrella =

Scientific classification
- Domain: Bacteria
- Kingdom: Pseudomonadati
- Phylum: Pseudomonadota
- Class: Betaproteobacteria
- Order: Burkholderiales
- Family: Alcaligenaceae
- Genus: Orrella; Carlier et al. 2017

Species
- O. dioscoreae

Genus of bacteria

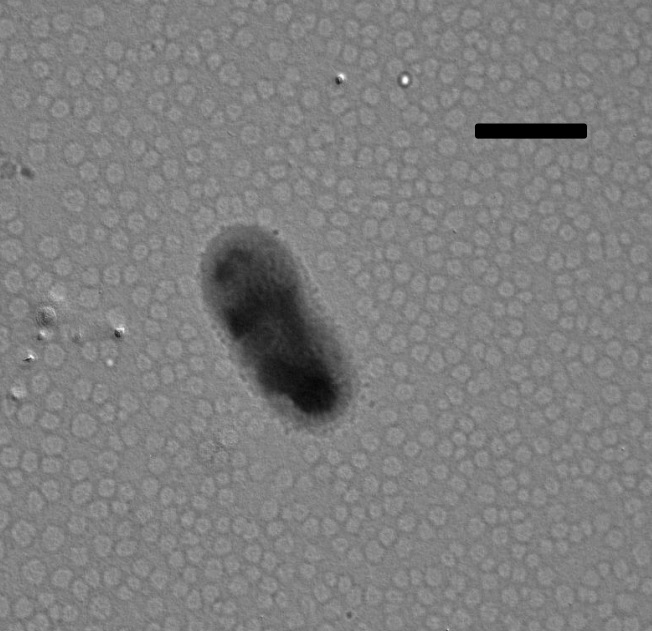

Orrella is a genus of gram-negative bacteria from the family of Alcaligenaceae with one known species (Orrella dioscoreae). O. dioscorreae was first isolated from the leaf glands of Dioscorea sansibarensis, a flowering plant from the yam family.
