= Advenella =

Scientific classification
- Domain: Bacteria
- Kingdom: Pseudomonadati
- Phylum: Pseudomonadota
- Class: Betaproteobacteria
- Order: Burkholderiales
- Family: Alcaligenaceae
- Genus: Advenella; Coenye et al. 2005

Type species
- Advenella incenata

Genus of bacteria

Advenella is a genus in the phylum Pseudomonadota (Bacteria). The two members of the genus Tetrathiobacter were transferred to this genus, namely Tetrathiobacter kashmirensis and Tetrathiobacter mimigardefordensis.

== Etymology ==
The name Advenella derives from:
Latin advena, a stranger, a foreigner; and ella, a diminutive; Advenella, then, means the little stranger, referring to the fact that the source of these unusual organisms is unknown.

== Species ==
The genus contains four species (including basionyms and synonyms):

- A. faeciporci (Matsuoka et al. 2012)
- A. incenata (Coenye et al. 2005), type species
- A. kashmirensis (Ghosh et al. 2005)
- A. mimigardefordensis (Wübbeler et al. 2006)
