= Achromobacter lyticus =

Scientific classification
- Domain: Bacteria
- Kingdom: Pseudomonadati
- Phylum: Pseudomonadota
- Class: Betaproteobacteria
- Order: Burkholderiales
- Family: Alcaligenaceae
- Genus: Achromobacter
- Species: A. lyticus

Binomial name
- Achromobacter lyticus Isono et al. 1972

Type strain
- ATCC 21456. G01, IFO 12456, IFO 12725, KCTC 2336, M-497-1, NBIMCC 2206, NBRC 12456, VKM B-1576

Species of bacterium

Achromobacter lyticus is a Gram-negative bacterium from the genus Achromobacter. The enzyme lysyl endopeptidase was isolated from A. lyticus.
