= Saccharedens =

Scientific classification
- Domain: Bacteria
- Kingdom: Pseudomonadati
- Phylum: Pseudomonadota
- Class: Betaproteobacteria
- Order: Burkholderiales
- Family: Alcaligenaceae
- Genus: Saccharedens; Lin et al. 2017

Type species
- Saccharedens versatilis

Species
- S. versatilis

Genus of bacteria

Saccharedens is a sugar-degrading genus of bacteria from the family of Alcaligenaceae with one known species (Saccharedens versatilis).
