= Restriction endonuclease BsobI/AvaI =

Endonuc-BsobI
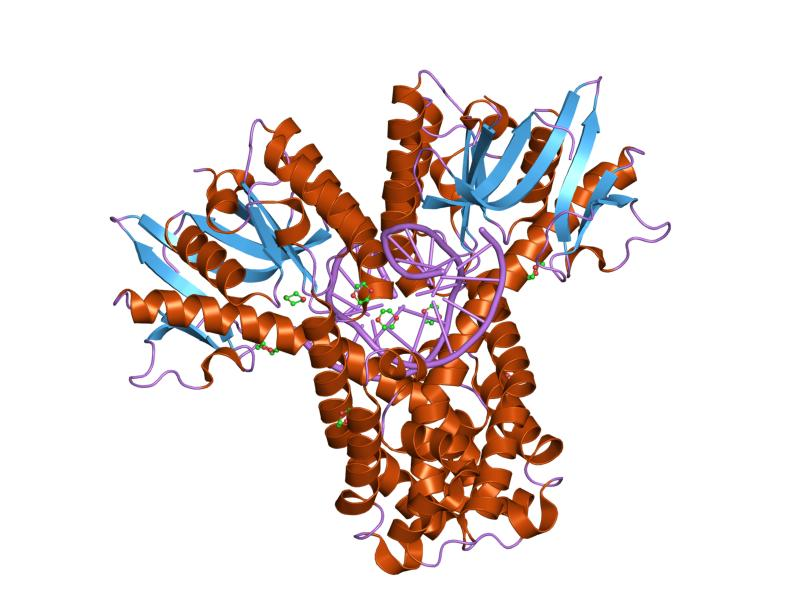
- restriction enzyme bsobi/dna complex structure: encirclement of the dna and histidine-catalyzed hydrolysis within a canonical restriction enzyme fold

Identifiers
- Symbol: Endonuc-BsobI
- Pfam: PF09194
- InterPro: IPR015277
- SCOP2: 1dc1 / SCOPe / SUPFAM
Available protein structures:
- PDB: IPR015277 PF09194 (ECOD; PDBsum)
- AlphaFold: IPR015277; PF09194

In molecular biology, the restriction endonuclease BsobI/AvaI family of enzymes includes the AvaI and BsoBI restriction endonucleases from Anabaena variabilis and Bacillus stearothermophilus, both of which recognise the double-stranded sequence CYCGRG (where Y = T/C, and R = A/G) and cleave after C-1.
