= Candidimonas =

Scientific classification
- Domain: Bacteria
- Kingdom: Pseudomonadati
- Phylum: Pseudomonadota
- Class: Betaproteobacteria
- Order: Burkholderiales
- Family: Alcaligenaceae
- Genus: Candidimonas; Vaz-Moreira et al. 2011

Type species
- Candidimonas nitroreducens

Species
- C. bauzanensis C. humi C. nitroreducens

Genus of bacteria

Candidimonas is a genus of bacteria from the family of Alcaligenaceae.
