= Pelistega =

Scientific classification
- Domain: Bacteria
- Kingdom: Pseudomonadati
- Phylum: Pseudomonadota
- Class: Betaproteobacteria
- Order: Burkholderiales
- Family: Alcaligenaceae
- Genus: Pelistega; Vandamme et al. 1998

Type species
- Pelistega europaea Vandamme et al. 1998

Species
- Pelistega europaea; Pelistega indica; Pelistega ratti; Pelistega suis

Genus of bacteria

Pelistega is a genus of bacteria of the family Alcaligenaceae.
