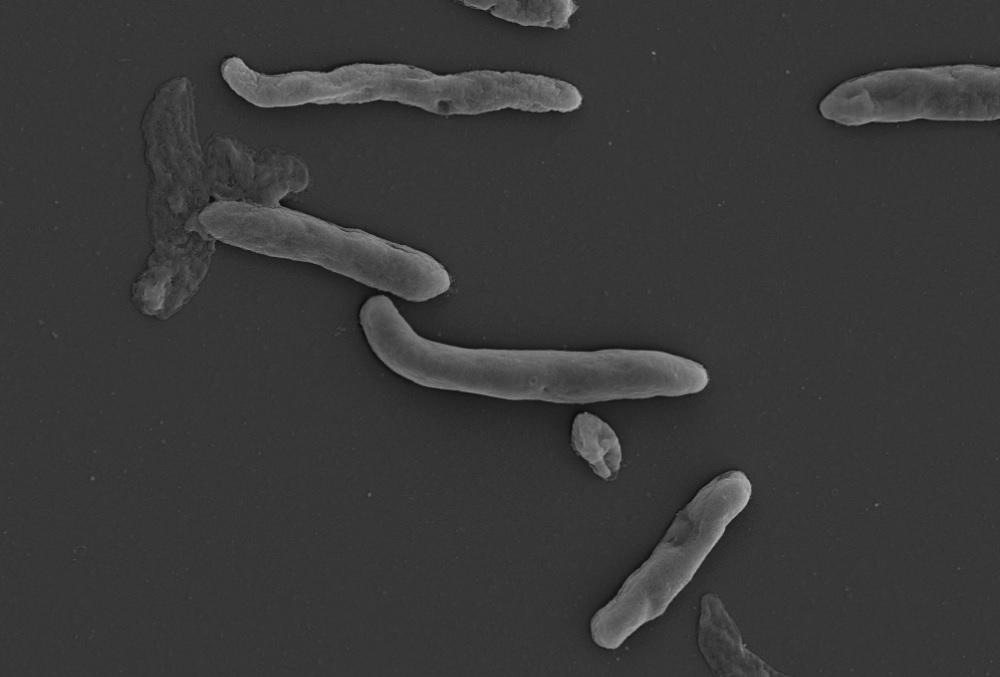

Scientific classification
- Domain: Bacteria
- Kingdom: Pseudomonadati
- Phylum: Pseudomonadota
- Class: Betaproteobacteria
- Order: Burkholderiales
- Family: Alcaligenaceae
- Genus: Derxia; Jensen et al. 1960

Type species
- Derxia gummosa

Species
- D. gummosa D. lacustris

= Derxia =

Genus of bacteria

Derxia is a genus of Gram-negative, nitrogen-fixing bacteria from the family of Alcaligenaceae.
