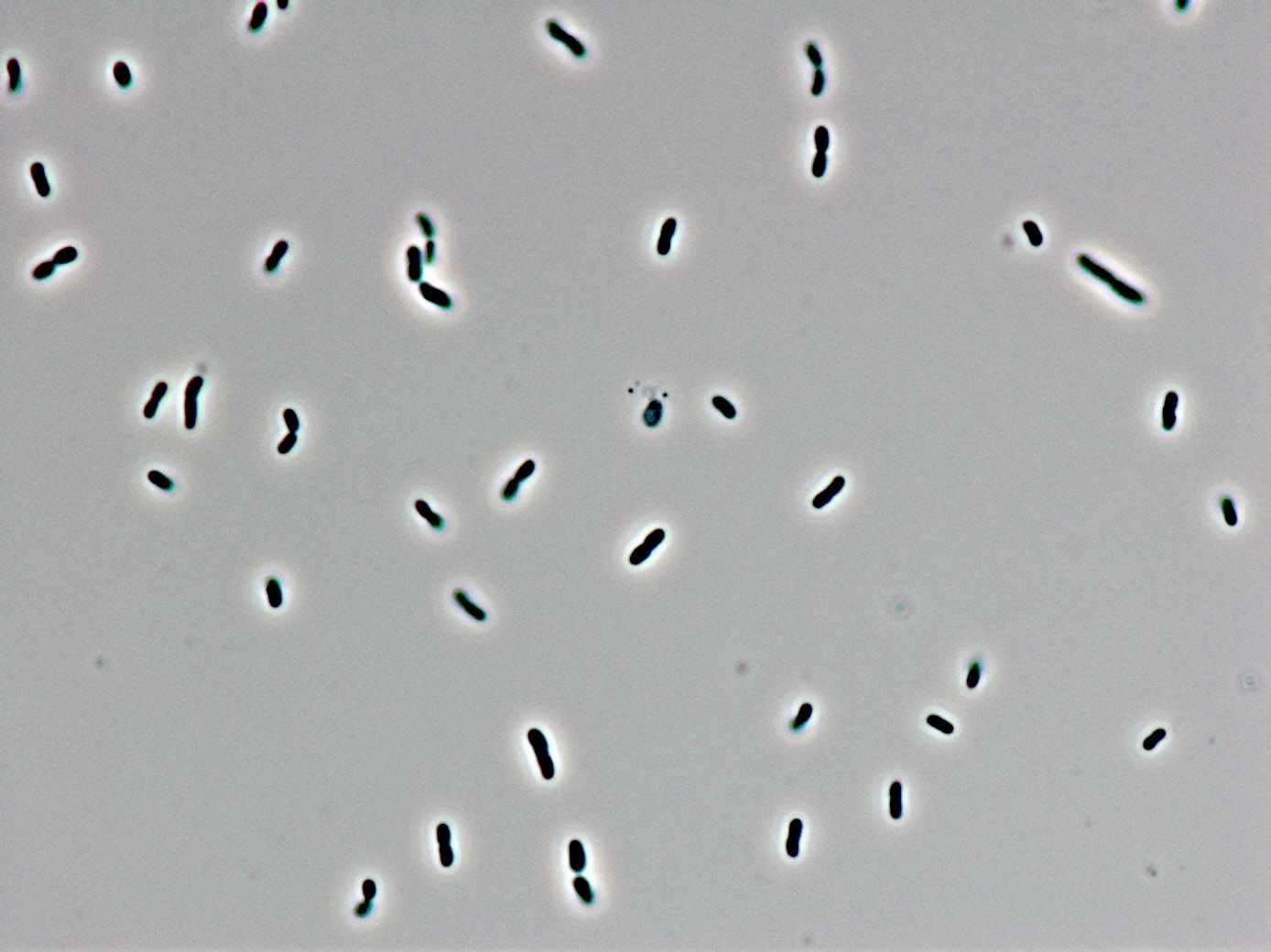
- Parapusillimonas granulo

Scientific classification
- Domain: Bacteria
- Kingdom: Pseudomonadati
- Phylum: Pseudomonadota
- Class: Betaproteobacteria
- Order: Burkholderiales
- Family: Alcaligenaceae
- Genus: Parapusillimonas; Kim et al. 2010

Type species
- Parapusillimonas granuli

Species
- P. granuli

= Parapusillimonas =

Genus of bacteria

Parapusillimonas is a genus of bacteria from the family of Alcaligenaceae with one known species (Parapusillimonas granuli).
