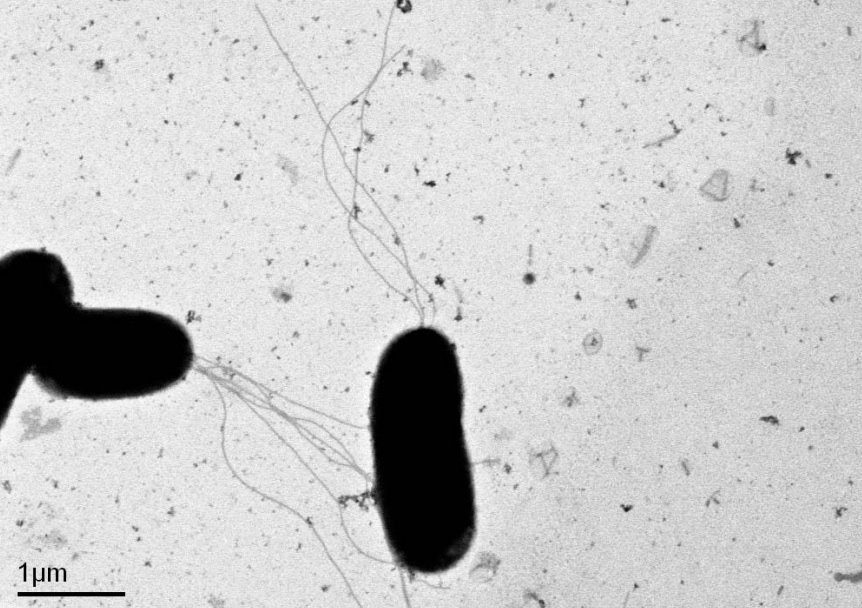
- Pigmentiphaga aceris

Scientific classification
- Domain: Bacteria
- Kingdom: Pseudomonadati
- Phylum: Pseudomonadota
- Class: Betaproteobacteria
- Order: Burkholderiales
- Family: Alcaligenaceae
- Genus: Pigmentiphaga; Blümel et al. 2001

Type species
- Pigmentiphaga kullae

Species
- P. daeguensis P. kullae P. litoralis P. soli

= Pigmentiphaga =

Genus of bacteria

Pigmentiphaga is a genus of motile and nonmotile bacteria of the family Alcaligenaceae. Members of the genus are gram-negative.
