= Brackiella =

Scientific classification
- Domain: Bacteria
- Kingdom: Pseudomonadati
- Phylum: Pseudomonadota
- Class: Betaproteobacteria
- Order: Burkholderiales
- Family: Alcaligenaceae
- Genus: Brackiella; Willems et al. 2002

Type species
- Brackiella oedipodis

Species
- B. oedipodis

Genus of bacteria

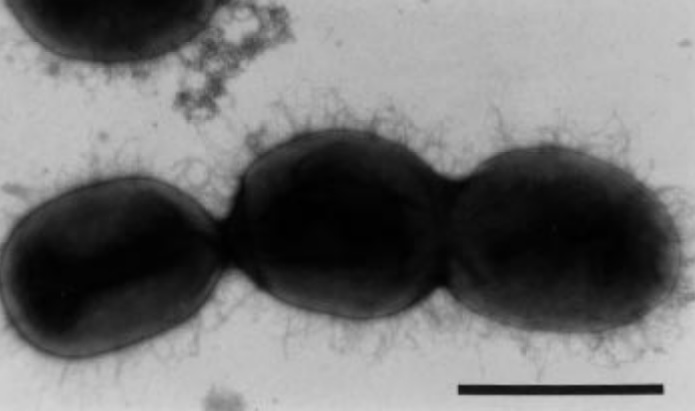
Brackiella oedipodis.

Brackiella is a genus of Gram-negative, oxidase- and catalase-positive, rod-shaped bacteria from the family of Alcaligenaceae with one known species (Brackiella oedipodis).
