= Basilea (bacterium) =

Scientific classification
- Domain: Bacteria
- Kingdom: Pseudomonadati
- Phylum: Pseudomonadota
- Class: Betaproteobacteria
- Order: Burkholderiales
- Family: Alcaligenaceae
- Genus: Basilea; Whiteson et al. 2014

Type species
- Basilea psittacipulmonis

Species
- B. psittacipulmonis

Genus of bacteria

Basilea is a genus of bacteria from the family of Alcaligenaceae with one known species (Basilea psittacipulmonis).
