= Paralcaligenes =

Scientific classification
- Domain: Bacteria
- Kingdom: Pseudomonadati
- Phylum: Pseudomonadota
- Class: Betaproteobacteria
- Order: Burkholderiales
- Family: Alcaligenaceae
- Genus: Paralcaligenes; Kim et al. 2011

Type species
- Paralcaligenes ureilyticus

Species
- P. ureilyticus P. ginsengisoli

Genus of bacteria

Paralcaligenes is a genus of bacteria from the family of Alcaligenaceae.
