= Paenalcaligenes =

Scientific classification
- Domain: Bacteria
- Kingdom: Pseudomonadati
- Phylum: Pseudomonadota
- Class: Betaproteobacteria
- Order: Burkholderiales
- Family: Alcaligenaceae
- Genus: Paenalcaligenes; Kämpfer et al. 2010

Type species
- Paenalcaligenes hominis

Species
- P. hermetiae P. hominis P. suwonensis P. niemegkensis

Genus of bacteria

Paenalcaligenes is a genus of gram-negative bacteria from the family of Alcaligenaceae.
