= AaaI =

Restriction enzyme

AaaI is a Type II restriction enzyme found in Acetobacter aceti ss aceti. Its prototype is XmaIII. It is in the subtype category 'P', meaning that it has symmetric target and cleavage sites.

Its recognition sequence is 5' CGGCG and 3' GCCGGC and its cut is 5' ---C GGCCG--- 3' and 3' ---GCCGG C--- 5'.

Its isoschizomers are BseX3I, BstZI, EagI, EclXI, Eco52I, SenPT16I, XmaIII, meaning that they have the same recognition sequences, but have been isolated from different bacteria, so they likely have different reaction conditions, making them different.
