= Achromobacter denitrificans =

Scientific classification
- Domain: Bacteria
- Kingdom: Pseudomonadati
- Phylum: Pseudomonadota
- Class: Betaproteobacteria
- Order: Burkholderiales
- Family: Alcaligenaceae
- Genus: Achromobacter
- Species: A. denitrificans

Binomial name
- Achromobacter denitrificans (Rüger and Tan 1983 ex Leifson and Hugh 1954) Coenye et al. 2003

Type strain
- AS 1.1786, ATCC 8750, BCRC 10828, CCM 1052, CCRC 10828, CCT 0192, CCT 1434, CCTM 2801, CCTM La 2801, CCUG 1325, CCUG 1814, CECT 928, CGMCC 1.0924, CGMCC 1.1786, CGMCC 1.2006, CIP 55.84, CIP 60-80, CIP 60.80, CIP 60.80T, CNCTC 5644, Conn 16, Conn H.J 16, Conn H.J. 16, DSM 30030, DSMZ 30030, FIRDI 828, H.J. Conn 16, HAMBI 1907, Hugh 135, Hugh R 135, Hugh R. 135, IAM 12369, IAM 12586, IAW 153, IFO 13111, IMET 10443, JCM 1474, JCM 20522, JCM 20663, KCTC 2678, Lautrop AB60, LautropAB60, LMAU A13, LMG 1229, LMG 2100, LMG 3366, LMG 3369, LMG 3371, NBIMCC 153, NBRC 13111, NCAIM B.01104, NCAIM B.02076, NCDO 868, NCFB 868, NCIB 8156, NCIB 8156, NCDO 868, NCIM 2105, NCIM 2262, NCIMB 8156, NCTC 11953, NICB 8156T, PCM 2223, RH 135, USCC 1366, USCC 2062, USCC 2593, VKM B-1518, VTT E-76056, VTT E-97056

Synonyms
- Alcaligenes denitrificans (ex Leifson and Hugh 1954) Rüger and Tan 1983

Species of bacterium

Achromobacter denitrificans is a Gram-negative, oxidase- and catalase-positive, strictly aerobic, ubiquitous, motile bacterium with peritrichous flagella from the genus Achromobacter which was isolated from soil and can cause human infections.

== History ==
Achromobacter denitrificans was first described as Alcaligenes denitrificans to the genus Alcaligenes. Based on 16S rDNA sequence analysis and the low degree of DNA relatedness between other members of Achromobacter species, Yabuuchi et al propose that Alcaligenes denitrificans should be classified as a subspecies of Achromobacter xylosoxidans (A. x. subsp. denitrificans). Formerly known as Achromobacter agile.
