= Oligella (bacterium) =

Scientific classification
- Domain: Bacteria
- Kingdom: Pseudomonadati
- Phylum: Pseudomonadota
- Class: Betaproteobacteria
- Order: Burkholderiales
- Family: Alcaligenaceae
- Genus: Oligella; Rossau et al. 1987

Type species
- Oligella urethralis

Species
- O. ureolytica O. urethralis

Genus of bacteria

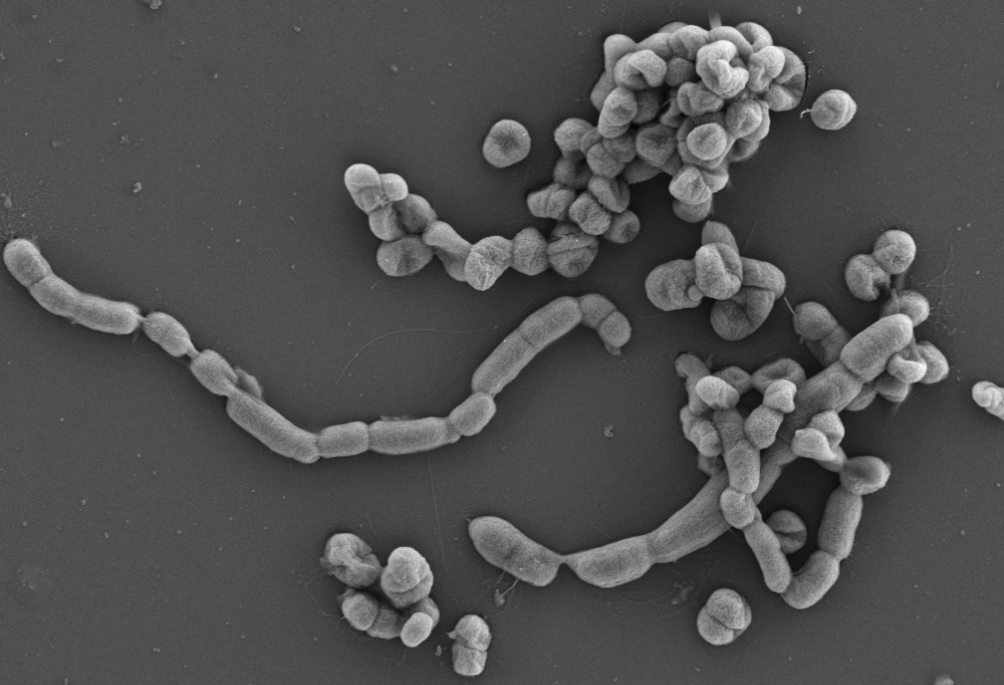
Oligella ureolytica

Oligella is a genus of Gram-negative, aerobic bacteria from the family Alcaligenaceae.

The genus Oligella includes at least two species. Oligella ureolytica is more prominent than O. urethralis.

== Clinical significance ==
Clinical infections due to these organisms are rare. The common causes are related to the genitourinary tract and urinary tract obstruction. Oligella spp. have also been detected in the ear canal and middle ear of people with chronic otitis media, however the clinical relevance of these species for otitis media is poorly understood.
