= Aquaspirillum serpens =

Scientific classification
- Domain: Bacteria
- Kingdom: Pseudomonadati
- Phylum: Pseudomonadota
- Class: Betaproteobacteria
- Order: Neisseriales
- Family: Neisseriaceae
- Genus: Aquaspirillum
- Species: A. serpens

Binomial name
- Aquaspirillum serpens (Müller 1786) Hylemon et al. 1973

Species of bacterium

Aquaspirillum serpens is a species of gram-negative bacteria in the family Neisseriaceae.

== Description ==
The surface of the cell of Aquaspirillum serpens has clear structures which take the form of linear bands at intervals of 17-18.5 nanometers (nm). There is also a variety of different patterns of ridges which surround protein subunits at the cell margin. Most of these consist of thin lines towards the edge of the cell wall, but they can be a hexagonal shape. The ridges are usually around 16 nm apart.

=== Flagella ===
Illustration of the flagellum of A. serpens

Aquaspirillum serpens is propelled by fewer than fifteen flagella at each of its poles, or ends.

The basal body, or protein structure at the base of the flagellum, consists of two pairs of disk-like structures. All of these disks are within the outer membrane of the bacterium. The outer pair of disks are very close to each other; the outermost is 18 nm in diameter and the more inner is 21 nm in diameter. The inner pair of disks have some form of membrane, making them appear larger. The more outer of the pair is 28 nm in diameter and the more inner is 18 nm in diameter. All of the disks are connected by a 10 nm wide rod which runs through their center. At the base of the innermost disk, there are numerous fibrillar structures, which could be vestigial or simply poorly preserved. The cell wall layers where the basal body attaches had numerous perforations when the basal body was removed.

The outer membrane of the flagellum has a set of what appear to be holes which are roughly 12 nm in diameter. Concentric membrane rings (CMRs) are attached to the inside of this membrane and surround the area where the basal body is embedded. There were up to seven of these rings which were up to 90 nm in diameter and were made of many protein subunits arranged in a plate-shaped structure. These subunits are regularly spaced out from one another. The innermost rings are the clearest and most well defined, and they form a collar around the perforation formed when the flagellum is removed. The outer membrane is slightly folded in on itself over the location of the CMRs, which may be because of a higher degree of rigidity afforded by the CMRs.

The murein sacculus, a bag-shaped structure made of peptidoglycan, is also perforated on its poles when the flagellum is removed. These perforations are larger than those of the outer membrane, but are smaller than the diameters of the disks on the basal body. They are of variable size, which indicates that the sacculus could be somewhat elastic.
