= Acidiphilium cryptum =

Scientific classification
- Domain: Bacteria
- Kingdom: Pseudomonadati
- Phylum: Pseudomonadota
- Class: Alphaproteobacteria
- Order: Rhodospirillales
- Family: Acetobacteraceae
- Genus: Acidiphilium
- Species: A. cryptum

Binomial name
- Acidiphilium cryptum Harrison 1981

Species of bacterium

Acidiphilium cryptum is a species of heterotrophic bacteria, the type species of its genus. It is gram-negative, aerobic, mesophilic and rod-shaped. It does not form endospores and some cells are motile by means of one polar flagellum or two lateral flagella Lhet2 (=ATCC 33463) is the type strain.
