= Acidiphilium =

Scientific classification
- Domain: Bacteria
- Kingdom: Pseudomonadati
- Phylum: Pseudomonadota
- Class: Alphaproteobacteria
- Order: Rhodospirillales
- Family: Acetobacteraceae
- Genus: Acidiphilium; Harrison 1981 emend. Kishimoto et al. 1996

Type species
- A. cryptum

Genus of bacteria

Acidiphilium is a genus in the phylum Pseudomonadota (Bacteria). As the name suggests, this comprises a nutritionally diverse genus of bacteria adapted to life in extremely acidic conditions, and often exhibiting Fe(III) (ferric iron) reduction.

== Etymology ==
The name Acidiphilium derives from:
Neo-Latin noun acidum (from Latin adjective acidus, sour), an acid; Neo-Latin neuter gender adjective philum (from Greek neuter gender adjective philon (φίλον)), friend, loving; Neo-Latin neuter gender noun Acidiphilium (sic), acid lover.

== Species ==
The genus contains 6 species (including basonyms and synonyms), namely

- A. acidophilum ((Harrison 1983) Hiraishi et al. 1998; Neo-Latin noun acidum (from Latin adjective acidus, sour), an acid; Neo-Latin neuter gender adjective philum (from Greek neuter gender adjective philon (φίλον)), friend, loving; Neo-Latin neuter gender adjective acidophilum, acid loving.), this species used to known as Thiobacillus acidophilus
- A. angustum (Wichlacz et al. 1986; Latin neuter gender adj, angustum, narrow, small, with respect to nutritional versatility.)
- A. cryptum (Harrison 1981, (Type species of the genus).; Neo-Latin neuter gender adjective cryptum (from Greek noun adjective krupton [sic]), hidden.)
- A. multivorum (Wakao et al. 1995; Latin adjective multus, many; Latin v. voro, to eat, devour; Neo-Latin neuter gender adjective multivorum, devouring many kinds of substances.)
- A. organovorum (Lobos et al. 1986; Neo-Latin pref. organo- (from Greek adjective organikos, of or pertaining to an organ), pertaining to organic chemical compounds; Latin v. voro, to eat, devour; Neo-Latin neuter gender adjective organovorum, devouring organic compounds.)
- A. rubrum (Wichlacz et al. 1986; Latin adjective ruber -bra -brum, red; Latin neuter gender adjective rubrum, red colored.)Acidocella aminolytica and Acidocella facilis used to be in this genus.

== See also ==
- Bacterial taxonomy
- Microbiology
