= Arthrobacter citreus =

Scientific classification
- Domain: Bacteria
- Kingdom: Bacillati
- Phylum: Actinomycetota
- Class: Actinomycetia
- Order: Micrococcales
- Family: Micrococcaceae
- Genus: Arthrobacter
- Species: A. citreus

Binomial name
- Arthrobacter citreus Sacks 1954 (Approved Lists 1980)

Type strain
- AJ 1423; AS 1.1893; ATCC 11624; BCRC 10374; C7; CCM 1647; CCRC 10374; CCTM 2712; CCTM La 2712; CCUG 23840; CDA 837; CGMCC 1.1893; CIP 102363; DSM 20133; HAMBI 89; HMGBB45; IAM 12341; IFO 12671; IFO 12957; IMET 10680; IMSNU 20062; JCM 1331; KCTC 1001; LMD 72.19; LMG 16338; NBIMCC 2008; NBRC 12671; NBRC 12957; NCCB 72019; NCIB 8915; NCIM 2320; NCIMB 8915; NRIC 1858; NRRL B-1258; Sacks C7; Suzuki CNF 021; VKM Ac-1106; VKM Ac-1125; VKM B-654; VKM B-801; VKMB-654; WRRLT; WRRL c-7

Species of bacterium

Arthrobacter citreus is a bacterium species from the genus Arthrobacter. Arthrobacter citreus has the ability to degrade phenol.
