= Acinetobacter lwoffii =

Scientific classification
- Domain: Bacteria
- Kingdom: Pseudomonadati
- Phylum: Pseudomonadota
- Class: Gammaproteobacteria
- Order: Pseudomonadales
- Family: Moraxellaceae
- Genus: Acinetobacter
- Species: A. lwoffii

Binomial name
- Acinetobacter lwoffii (Audureau 1940) Brisou and Prévot 1954 (Approved Lists 1980)

Species of bacterium

Acinetobacter lwoffii, formerly known as Mima polymorpha or Acinetobacter calcoaceticus var. lwoffii, is a non-fermentative Gram-negative bacillus bacterium that is a member of the genus Acinetobacter. It is considered as normal skin flora and can also inhabit the human oropharynx and perineum of up to 25% of the population. In addition to that, it can cause infections in human hosts, particularly catheter-associated infections in immunocompromised patients. It has also been associated with at least one case of gastroenteritis. Due to its ability to survive dry conditions, low pH, and a wide range of temperatures, A. lwoffii, along with A. johnsonii, has been found in frozen food, bacon, eggs, pasteurized milk, and fish. It is also resistant to many disinfectants, irradiation, and desiccation. There are also many environmental A. lwoffii strains originating for instance from a permafrost or former gold mine.

Acinetobacter lwoffii has been reported as a pathogen in animals and humans and the presence of multidrug resistance in this species is of concern. A. lwoffii has been identified as a cause of neonatal sepsis, with isolates showing multidrug resistance but remaining sensitive to some antibiotics such as imipenem, cotrimoxazole, and ciprofloxacin. Multidrug-resistant strains of A. lwoffii have been found in dairy cattle with mastitis in China, raising concerns about its role in livestock infections and possible risks for food safety and transmission to humans A. lwoffii has been reported as a pathogen in Schizothorax fish in China, causing organ damage and showing resistance to several antibiotics. More than 80% of isolates contain multiple plasmids, which contribute to antibiotic resistance, improving its ability to persist in diverse environments. Inhaling A. lwoffii has been shown to reduce asthma development in mice by changing lung immune cell activity and reducing type-2 responses.
