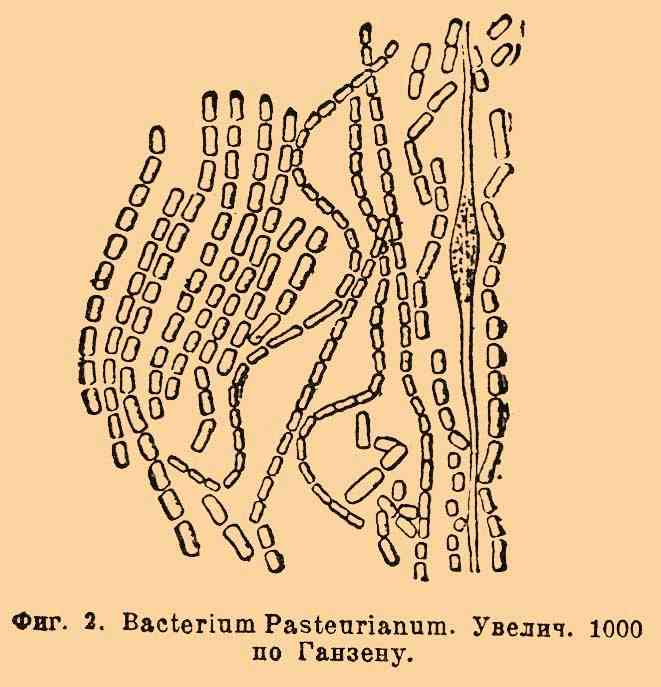

Scientific classification
- Domain: Bacteria
- Kingdom: Pseudomonadati
- Phylum: Pseudomonadota
- Class: Alphaproteobacteria
- Order: Rhodospirillales
- Family: Acetobacteraceae
- Genus: Acetobacter
- Species: A. aceti

Binomial name
- Acetobacter aceti (Pasteur 1864) Beijerinck 1898

= Acetobacter aceti =

Species of bacterium

Acetobacter aceti, a Gram-negative bacterium that moves using its peritrichous flagella, was discovered when Louis Pasteur proved it to be the cause of conversion of ethanol to acetic acid in 1864. Today, A. aceti is recognized as a species within the genus Acetobacter, belonging to the family Acetobacteraceae in the class Alphaproteobacteria. Its bacterial motility plays an important role in the formation of biofilms, intricate communities where A. aceti cells aggregate and collaborate, further enhancing their ability to metabolize ethanol and produce acetic acid. Widely distributed in various environmental niches, this benign microorganism thrives in habitats abundant in fermentable sugars, such as flowers, fruits, honey, water, and soil, present wherever sugar fermentation occurs. A. aceti grows best within temperatures ranging from 25 to 30 degrees Celsius, with an upper limit of 35 degrees Celsius, and in slightly acidic conditions with a pH between 5.5 and 6.3. A. aceti has long been used in the fermentation industry efficiently producing acetic acid from alcohol as an obligate aerobe dependent on oxygen as the terminal electron acceptor. A. aceti, classified as an acidophile, able to survive in acidic environments, possesses an acidified cytoplasm, providing most proteins with acid stability. The microorganism's ability to thrive in environments rich in fermentable sugars shows its potential as an organism for studying microbial metabolism and adaptation.

Besides its ecological role, A. aceti holds a significant economic value, particularly in vinegar production, where it catalyzes the conversion of ethanol in wine or cider into acetic acid. The acetic acid it generates is used in the manufacturing of acetate rayon, plastics production, rubber production, and photographic chemicals. In addition to its industrial applications, A. aceti's unique metabolic capabilities have gained attention in biotech research. Studies have found that it has the potential to be a key player in the production of bio-based chemicals and renewable materials, using its enzymatic machinery for sustainable manufacturing processes. Acetobacter aceti is a multifaceted organism with ecological, industrial, and biotechnological significance, showing its pivotal role in metabolism and economic value.

== History ==
The history of Acetobacter aceti is intertwined with the history of vinegar production and microbial fermentation. The production of vinegar, which come from fermented fruits or grains, dates back thousands of years. Ancient civilizations have used vinegar for medicinal and cooking purposes. As time went on, people paid more and more attention to the process of fermentation, which converts sugars into alcohol and then into vinegar in the presence of oxygen. In the late 19th century, Martinus Beijerinck (Dutch microbiologist) isolated various bacteria involved in vinegar production, specifically the genus Acetobacter. In the early 20th century, scientist Louis Pasteur's research identified the role of Acetobacter aceti in the conversion of alcohol to acetic acid. Research on A. aceti has expanded to explore their biotechnological applications beyond vinegar production including biofuel production, bioremediation, food fermentation, and synthesis of biopolymers.

== Genetics ==
Acetobacter aceti belongs to the family Acetobacteraceae which comprises two genera termed Acetobacter and Gluconobacter. Acetobacter oxidizes ethanol to acetic acid while Gluconobacter uses solely glucose for its metabolic processes. Many sequenced strains of A. aceti, including NBRC 14818 and JCM20276, have been shown to contain a genome consisting of one chromosome and four plasmids. The A. aceti strain NBRC 14818 contains 3,596,270 base pairs in its chromosome.

== Metabolism ==
A. aceti is a unique microorganism because of its ability to survive in high concentrations of acetic acid. This microbe utilizes a two-step oxidation of ethanol to acetate. Ethanol is oxidized by membrane-bound proteins called pyrroloquinoline quinone-dependent alcohol dehydrogenase (PQQ- dependent ADH) to produce acetyl aldehyde. PQQ-dependent ADH proteins reside within the periplasm. Acetyl aldehyde is then oxidized by the enzyme aldehyde dehydrogenase to produce acetate resulting in the incomplete oxidation of ethanol. Subsequently, acetate can be used in the TCA cycle (tricarboxylic acid cycle) after ethanol is depleted. Acetate is then converted into acetyl-CoA by either the enzyme acetyl-CoA synthetase or mediated by phosphotransacetylase and acetate kinase. Alternatively, an efflux pump can also drive acetate out of the microbe. A. aceti strains can tolerate extracellular acetic acid concentrations of 5 to 20 percent.

== Industrial use ==
=== Acetic acid production ===
A. aceti is widely used in industrial vinegar production due to its ability to produce high concentrations of acetic acid from ethanol while also having a high resistance to acetic acid.

=== Diabetes ===
Diabetes is a significant health issue affecting millions of Americans, prompting researchers to find effective treatments and potential cures. A. aceti is emerging as a candidate due to its potential role in controlling diabetes. Probiotics have been identified as a therapeutic method for diabetes treatment with recent studies identifying chromium and zinc rich strains of A. aceti to enhance the hypoglycemic effects of the probiotic. An experiment was conducted in which researchers compared the efficacy of A. aceti to metformin, a common treatment for patients with type 2 diabetes. The result showed that A. aceti not only increased insulin secretion but also contributed to the repair of damaged pancreatic tissue, showing its potential as a valuable therapeutic method in diabetes treatment.

=== Cellulose production ===
Cellulose is a carbohydrate, specifically a polysaccharide, which can be found in the cell walls of plants, algae, fungi, and some bacteria. Through its production of acetic acid and oxidation of ethanol, A. aceti plays a crucial role in synthesis of bacterial cellulose. Bacterial cellulose is unique from plant cellulose due to its highly pure and crystalline structure. This bacterial cellulose is valued for its high purity, strength, and unique properties. It is used for production of biofilms, medical dressings, and food products.

=== Biofilm formation ===
A. aceti is typically known as corrosive as it produces acetic acid which causes severe corrosion of copper and steel in many industrial settings. However, it has also been discovered that when in a solution with ethanol, a biofilm of A. aceti forms and can be used as a protective layer to prevent corrosion of carbon and steel. This is important because if A. aceti biofilms are used to reduce microbiologically induced corrosion, industrial profits will increase.

== Safety ==
Acetobacter aceti is not known to be a human pathogen and is generally regarded as safe to handle in industrial settings. Human skin does not provide the bacteria with the optimal conditions for it to grow, reducing the risk of infection or adverse effects from direct contact. The optimum growth of A. aceti is lower than the temperature found in the human body making it unlikely for it to inhabit both the human body and animals in general allowing it to be listed on the FDA's list of GRAS (generally recognized as safe) microorganisms.

While A. aceti poses minimal risk to humans, it may have implications for the environment, particularly in agriculture. Some evidence suggests that A. aceti can be harmful to plants and other flora potentially disrupting natural ecosystems. A. aceti's metabolic activity and production of acetic acid may influence soil pH and microbial communities, which can impact soil health and ecosystem dynamics. A. aceti has also been found to cause rotting of fruits such as apples and pears. So, while A. aceti is considered safe for human contact, its interactions with the environment warrant further research to understand its potential ecological impacts and inform sustainable management practices.
