= Anabaena variabilis =

Scientific classification
- Domain: Bacteria
- Kingdom: Bacillati
- Phylum: Cyanobacteriota
- Class: Cyanophyceae
- Order: Nostocales
- Family: Nostocaceae
- Genus: Anabaena
- Species: A. variabilis

Binomial name
- Anabaena variabilis Kützing ex Bornet & Flahault, 1886

Species of bacterium

Anabaena variabilis is a species of filamentous cyanobacterium. This species of the genus Anabaena and the domain Eubacteria is capable of photosynthesis. This species, though photoautotrophic like other cyanobacteria, can also be heterotrophic, meaning that it may grow without light in the presence of fructose. It also can convert atmospheric dinitrogen to ammonia via nitrogen fixation.

Anabaena variabilis is a phylogenic-cousin of the more well-known species Nostoc spirrilum. Both of these species along with many other cyanobacteria are known to form symbiotic relationships with plants. Other cyanobacteria are known to form symbiotic relationships with diatoms, though no such relationship has been observed with Anabaena variabilis.

Anabaena variabilis is also a model organism for studying the beginnings of multicellular life due to its filamentous characterization and cellular-differentiation capabilities.
