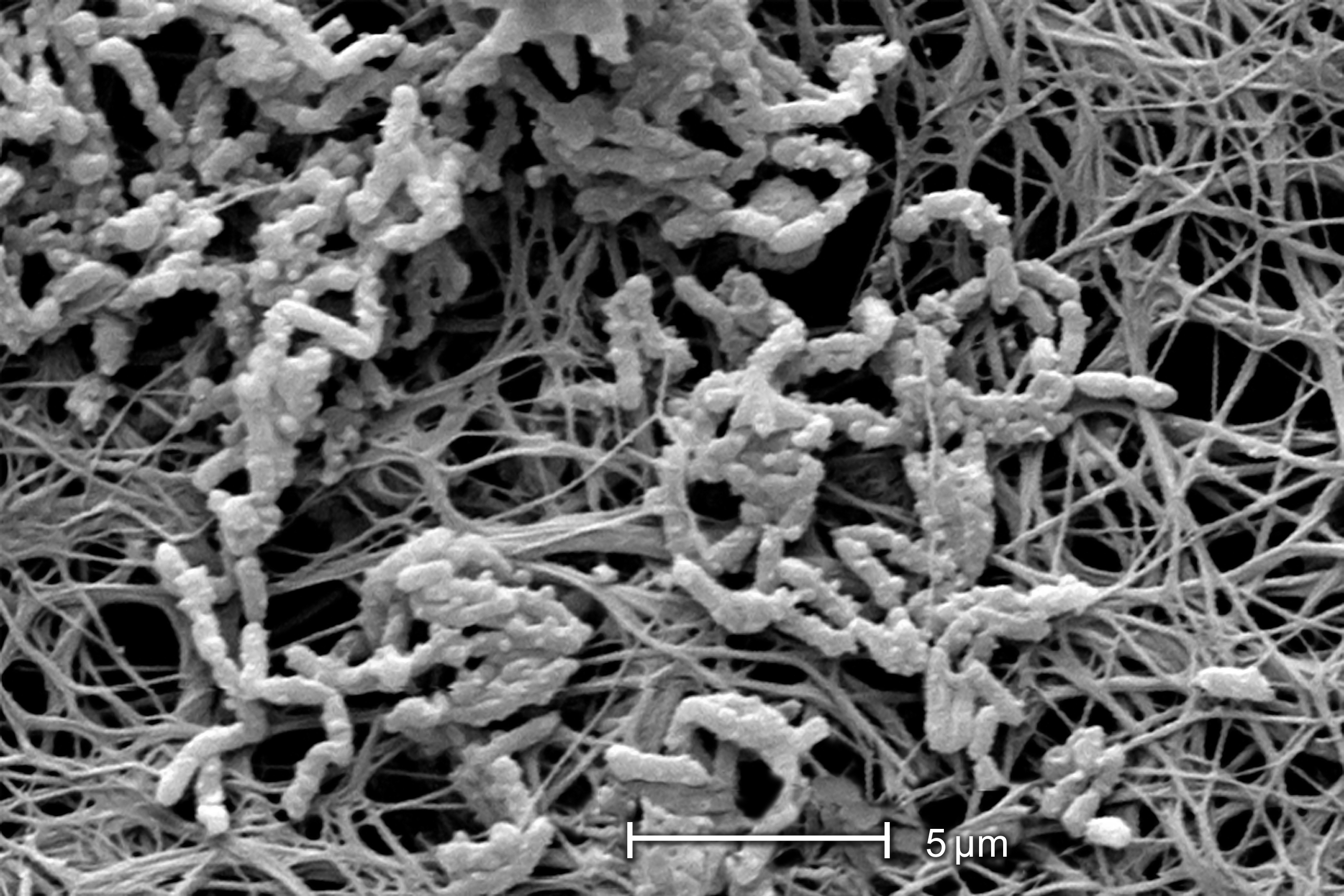
- Achromobacter xylosoxidans

Scientific classification
- Domain: Bacteria
- Kingdom: Pseudomonadati
- Phylum: Pseudomonadota
- Class: Betaproteobacteria
- Order: Burkholderiales
- Family: Alcaligenaceae
- Genus: Achromobacter; Yabuuchi and Yano 1981

Type species
- Achromobacter xylosoxidans

Species
- A. arsenitoxydans A. cholinophagum A. clevelandea A. cycloclastes A. denitrificans A. insolitus A. lyticus A. marplatensis A. obae A. piechaudii A. ruhlandii A. spanius A. xylosoxidans

= Achromobacter =

Genus of bacteria

Achromobacter is a genus of bacteria, included in the family Alcaligenaceae in the order Burkholderiales. The cells are Gram-negative straight rods and are motile by using one to 20 peritrichous flagella. They are strictly aerobic and are found in water (fresh and marine) and soils. They have also been identified as a contaminant in laboratory cell cultures. They have been identified as opportunistic human pathogens in people with certain immunosuppressive conditions such as cystic fibrosis, cancer and kidney failure. They also have been known to be resistant to antibiotics.
