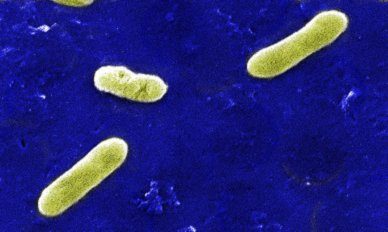
- Bordetella bronchiseptica

Scientific classification
- Domain: Bacteria
- Kingdom: Pseudomonadati
- Phylum: Pseudomonadota
- Class: Betaproteobacteria
- Order: Burkholderiales
- Family: Alcaligenaceae; De Ley et al., 1986

Genera
- Achromobacter; Advenella; Alcaligenes; Ampullimonas; Azohydromonas; Basilea; Bordetella; Brackiella; Caenimicrobium; Candidimonas; Castellaniella; Derxia; Eoetvoesia; Kerstersia; Oligella; Orrella; Paenalcaligenes; Paracandidimonas; Paralcaligenes; Parapusillimonas; Parvibium; Pelistega; Pigmentiphaga; Pusillimonas; Saccharedens; Taylorella; Verticiella

= Alcaligenaceae =

Family of bacteria

The Alcaligenaceae are a family of bacteria, included in the order Burkholderiales. Members are found in water, soil, humans, and other animals. Some species, like Bordetella, are pathogenic for humans and for some other animals.
