= CYL =

CYL can refer to:

- Cylindrospermopsin, a cyanotoxin produced by a variety of freshwater cyanobacteria
- Leung Chun-ying, Chinese politician from Hong Kong
- Communist Youth League of China, the youth wing of the Chinese Communist Party
- Wawrzyniec Cyl, a Polish footballer

== See also ==
- Cyl (disambiguation)
- CYN
- Communist Youth League (disambiguation)
