= Cyl =

Cyl or CyL or CYL may refer to:

- Cylindrospermopsin, a cyanotoxin produced by a variety of freshwater cyanobacteria
- Spanish initialism for Castile and León, an autonomous community of Spain
- an abbreviation used in eyeglass prescription

== People with the surname ==
- Agnieszka Cyl (born 1984), Polish athlete
- Wawrzyniec Cyl (1900–1974), Polish footballer

== See also ==
- CYL (disambiguation)
- Syl
