= Cylindrospermopsis =

Scientific classification
- Domain: Bacteria
- Phylum: Cyanobacteria
- Class: Cyanophyceae
- Order: Nostocales
- Family: Aphanizomenonaceae
- Genus: Cylindrospermopsis; Seenayya & Subbaraju, 1972

Genus of bacteria

Cylindrospermopsis is a planktonic genus of filamentous cyanobacteria known for its blooms in eutrophic waters. The type species is the tropical Cylindrospermopsis raciborskii (Woloszynska) Seenayya & Subbaraju. The cyanotoxin cylindrospermopsin was first identified from a species of this genus.
