= Raphidiopsis raciborskii =

Scientific classification
- Domain: Bacteria
- Kingdom: Bacillati
- Phylum: Cyanobacteriota
- Class: Cyanophyceae
- Order: Nostocales
- Family: Aphanizomenonaceae
- Genus: Raphidiopsis
- Species: R. raciborskii

Binomial name
- Raphidiopsis raciborskii (Wołoszyńska) Aguilera et al. 2018

Synonyms
- Anabaena raciborskii Wołoszyńska, 1912; Cylindrospermopsis raciborskii (Wołoszyńska) Seenayya & Subba Raju, 1972

Species of bacterium

Raphidiopsis raciborskii is a freshwater cyanobacterium.

This bacterium is an aquatic photosynthetic bacteria belonging to the phylum Cyanobacteria. They are composed of chained filaments known as trichomes that can show variation in morphology, varying from about 50–300 micrometers in length. These bacteria can also produce a thick walled, cylindrical, spore like structure known as akinetes, which also demonstrate variation in morphology. Some strains of this species are able to produce several toxins which affect humans: cylindrospermopsin, anatoxin-a and saxitoxin. This first toxin, cylindrospermopsin, has the ability to affect the liver and kidneys in humans as well as cause mild skin reactions upon exposure. The last two toxins, anatoxin-a and saxitoxin, are thought to be shellfish neurotoxins. Research has shown that C. raciborskii can naturally produce butylated hydroxytoluene, an antioxidant, food additive, and industrial chemical.

== Ecology ==
This bacterium is a freshwater cyanobacterium often found in tropical regions but can be also found in more temperate locations such as the Great Lakes located in North America. The bacterium has the ability to fix atmospheric nitrogen as well as absorb and store phosphorus. These abilities are advantageous to its survival in deep bodies of water where it has to compete for light. Under environmental stresses such as cool temperatures or low nutrients the bacteria has the ability to form its spore like structure known as akinetes. These akinetes can persist in sediment for long periods of time, and are able to germinate once water temperatures rise to the appropriate level. The bacteria prefers temperatures ranging from 25–30 °C, light intensity of 80–121 μmol m-2 s-1, and a max salinity concentration of 4 g L-1 NaCl (i.e. slighlty brackish waters). The levels of the bacteria typically stay relatively low throughout the summer, however it can be associated with very high concentrations under certain conditions. These conditions include: low flow; low water level; low nitrogen to phosphorus ratio; high water temperature; stable thermal stratification; increased retention time; high pH; high sulfate concentration; anoxia in at least some strata; high turbidity; high incident irradiation; and low macrophyte biomass.

== History ==
The bacterium is thought to have originated in tropical or sub tropical regions. However, the bacterium has recently been discovered in more temperate climates such as the Great Lakes in North America. The strain found in North America is thought to have originated in South America and it is believed that climate change is a factor behind the expansion of the bacteria's environment. So far there have been no documented effects of the species being present in the Great Lakes. However, this bacterium has been linked to liver damage and even death in humans after the contamination of water supplies. It has also been linked to fish kills in Brazil, cattle death in Australia, reduction of zooplankton in Florida, as well as toxicity to some shellfish, which it accumulates in organisms such as crayfish.

== Nitrogen-fixation pathway ==
Cylindrospermopsis raciborskii is a filamentous cyanobacteria with the ability to fix nitrogen by converting atmospheric nitrogen (N2) into ammonia (NH3), thus distinguishing it as a heterocyst. It provides the cells in the filament with nitrogen for biosynthesis by fixing nitrogen from dinitrogen (N2) using the enzyme nitrogenase. Normally, nitrogenase is inactivated by oxygen, which forces the bacterium to operate in a microanaerobic environment. The heterocyst's unique structure and physiology requires a global change in gene expression. This includes a variety of mechanisms including, but not limited to:

- Producing three additional cell walls, including one of glycolipid that forms a hydrophobic barrier to oxygen
- producing nitrogenase and other proteins involved in nitrogen fixation
- the degradation of photosystem II, which produces oxygen
- up-regulation of glycolytic enzymes
- producing proteins that scavenge any remaining oxygen
- containing polar plugs composed of cyanophycin which slows down cell-to-cell diffusion

Cylindrospermopsis raciborskii obtains its fixed carbon via photosynthesis. The lack of photosystem II would normally prevent it from photosynthesizing, but the vegetative cells provide the necessary carbohydrates, which is thought to be sucrose. The fixed carbon and nitrogen sources are exchanged through channels between the cells in the filament. C. raciborskii does maintain photosystem I, allowing it to generate ATP by cyclic photophosphorylation.

The mechanism of controlling this nitrogen fixation pathway is thought to involve the diffusion of an inhibitor of differentiation called patS. Heterocyst formation is inhibited in the presence of a fixed nitrogen source, such as ammonium or nitrate. Therefore, maintenance is dependent on an enzyme called hetN. An alternate method involves the bacteria entering a symbiotic relationship with certain plants. In such relationships, the bacteria does not respond to the availability of nitrogen, but rather to signals produced by the plant. In this method, up to 60% of the cells can become heterocystic, providing fixed nitrogen to the plant in return for fixed carbon.

== Pathogenesis ==
The appearance of cyanobacteria in water storage bodies is becoming of increasing importance and is a major factor in the eutrophication of rivers and streams. Many times the effects of the bacteria's presence can be toxic for livestock and wildlife, as well as for humans. Its exact mode of virulence, however, is still unknown. It has been narrowed down that its virulence is primarily hepatotoxic, although other organs such as the kidneys can be involved.

== Population dynamics ==
It is known that Cylindrospermopsis raciborskii has the ability to tolerate a rather wide range of climatic conditions. Its ability to produce akinetes assures survival even under harsher winter conditions. The population dynamics is highly dependent on lake water temperature and underwater light intensity and thus on climatic conditions. Therefore, any future increase in lake water temperature will presumably lead to an increase in the size of C. raciborskii populations in eutrophic lakes posing an increased threat to drinking water supply.

=== Palm Island incident ===
In 1979, Cylindrospermopsis raciborskii was attributed with causing hepatoenteritis (an infection of the liver resembling hepatitis) in 148 people off the northern coast of Queensland at Palm Island. The contamination of drinking water was attributed to copper sulfate treatment in the island's drinking-water supply, Solomon Dam. The copper sulfate was intended to control a dense algal bloom. However, copper sulfate causes lysis of cyanobacteria, leading to the release of any toxic cellular components. It was determined after an investigation that the contaminated water was all from Solomon Dam where the copper sulfate was applied. It was during this investigation that C. raciborskii was first identified as a pathogen.

== See also ==
- Butylated hydroxytoluene
- Cyanotoxin
