= Anatoxin-a =

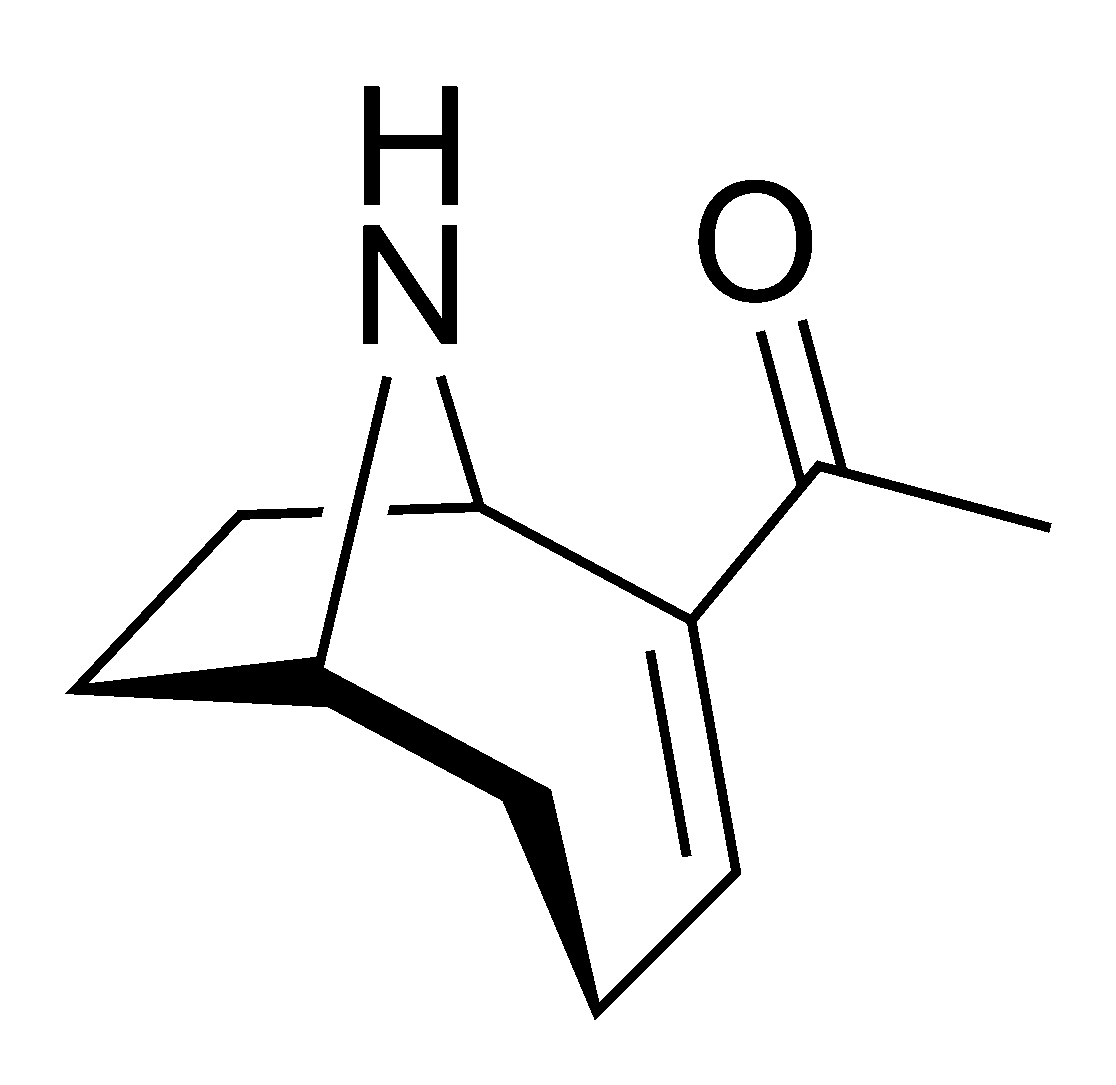

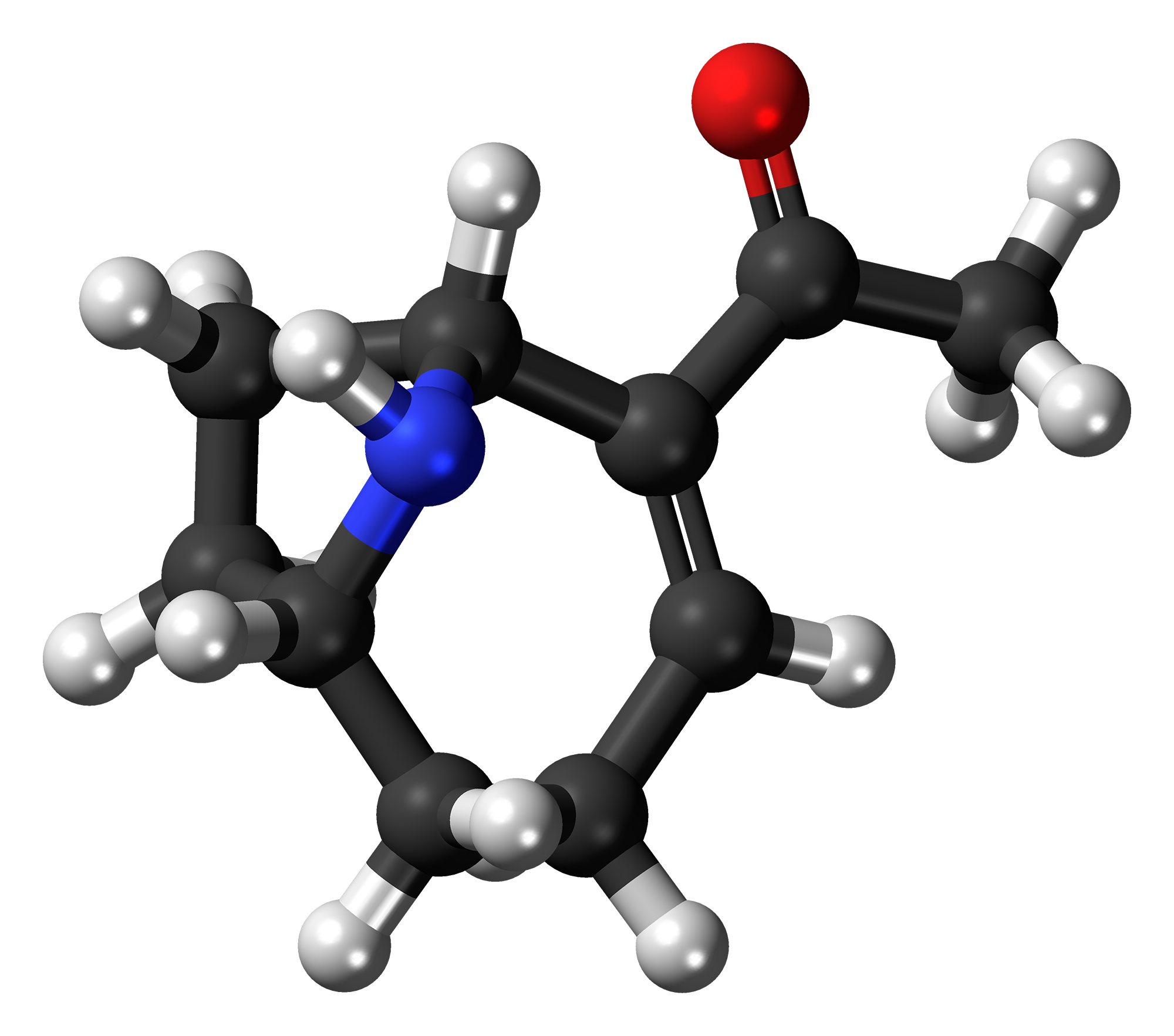

Names
- IUPAC name 1-(9-azabicyclo[4.2.1]non-2-en-2-yl)ethan-1-one
- Other names Anatoxin A

Identifiers
CAS Number	64285-06-9
3D model (JSmol)	Interactive image
ChEMBL	ChEMBL25619
ChemSpider	381822
ECHA InfoCard	100.215.761
KEGG	C10841
PubChem CID	3034748
UNII	80023A73NK
CompTox Dashboard (EPA)	DTXSID301338831 DTXSID50867064, DTXSID301338831
- InChI: InChI=1S/C10H15NO/c1-7(12)9-4-2-3-8-5-6-10(9)11-8/h4,8,10-11H,2-3,5-6H2,1H3 Key: SGNXVBOIDPPRJJ-UHFFFAOYSA-N; InChI=1/C10H15NO/c1-7(12)9-4-2-3-8-5-6-10(9)11-8/h4,8,10-11H,2-3,5-6H2,1H3 Key: SGNXVBOIDPPRJJ-UHFFFAOYAZ
- SMILES: CC(=O)C1=CCCC2CCC1N2

Properties
Chemical formula	C_{10}H_{15}NO
Molar mass	165.232
- Except where otherwise noted, data are given for materials in their standard state (at 25 °C [77 °F], 100 kPa). verify (what is ?) Infobox references

Anatoxin-a, also known as Very Fast Death Factor (VFDF), is a secondary, bicyclic amine alkaloid and cyanotoxin with acute neurotoxicity. It was first discovered in the early 1960s in Canada, and was isolated in 1972. The toxin is produced by multiple genera of cyanobacteria and has been reported in North America, South America, Central America, Europe, Africa, Asia, and Oceania. Symptoms of anatoxin-a toxicity include loss of coordination, muscular fasciculations, convulsions and death by respiratory paralysis. Its mode of action is through the nicotinic acetylcholine receptor (nAchR) where it mimics the binding of the receptor's natural ligand, acetylcholine. As such, anatoxin-a has been used for medicinal purposes to investigate diseases characterized by low acetylcholine levels. Due to its high toxicity and potential presence in drinking water, anatoxin-a poses a threat to animals, including humans. While methods for detection and water treatment exist, scientists have called for more research to improve reliability and efficacy. Anatoxin-a is not to be confused with guanitoxin (formerly anatoxin-a(S)), another potent cyanotoxin that has a similar mechanism of action to that of anatoxin-a and is produced by many of the same cyanobacteria genera, but is structurally unrelated.

== History ==
Anatoxin-a was first discovered by P.R. Gorham in the early 1960s, after several herds of cattle died as a result of drinking water from Saskatchewan Lake in Ontario, Canada, which contained toxic algal blooms. It was isolated in 1972 by J.P. Devlin from the cyanobacteria Anabaena flos-aquae.

== Occurrence ==
Anatoxin-a is a neurotoxin produced by multiple genera of freshwater cyanobacteria that are found in water bodies globally. Some freshwater cyanobacteria are known to be salt tolerant and thus it is possible for anatoxin-a to be found in estuarine or other saline environments. Blooms of cyanobacteria that produce anatoxin-a among other cyanotoxins are increasing in frequency due to increasing temperatures, stratification, and eutrophication due to nutrient runoff. These expansive cyanobacterial harmful algal blooms, known as cyanoHABs, increase the amount of cyanotoxins in the surrounding water, threatening the health of both aquatic and terrestrial organisms. Some species of cyanobacteria that produce anatoxin-a don't produce surface water blooms but instead form benthic mats. Many cases of anatoxin-a related animal deaths have occurred due to ingestion of detached benthic cyanobacterial mats that have washed ashore.

Anatoxin-a producing cyanobacteria have also been found in soils and aquatic plants. Anatoxin-a sorbs well to negatively charged sites in clay-like, organic-rich soils and weakly to sandy soils. One study found both bound and free anatoxin-a in 38% of aquatic plants sampled across 12 Nebraskan reservoirs, with much higher incidence of bound anatoxin-a than free.

== Experimental studies ==
In 1977, Carmichael, Gorham, and Biggs experimented with anatoxin-a. They introduced toxic cultures of A. flos-aquae into the stomachs of two young male calves, and observed that muscular fasciculations and loss of coordination occurred in a matter of minutes, while death due to respiratory failure occurred anywhere between several minutes and a few hours. They also established that extensive periods of artificial respiration did not allow for detoxification to occur and natural neuromuscular functioning to resume. From these experiments, they calculated that the oral minimum lethal dose (MLD) (of the algae, not the anatoxin molecule), for calves is roughly 420 mg/kg body weight.

In the same year, Devlin and colleagues discovered the bicyclic secondary amine structure of anatoxin-a. They also performed experiments similar to those of Carmichael et al. on mice. They found that anatoxin-a kills mice 2–5 minutes after intraperitoneal injection preceded by twitching, muscle spasms, paralysis and respiratory arrest, hence the name Very Fast Death Factor. They determined the LD50 for mice to be 250 μg/kg body weight.

Electrophysiological experiments done by Spivak et al. (1980) on frogs showed that anatoxin-a is a potent agonist of the muscle-type (α_{1})_{2}βγδ nAChR. Anatoxin-a induced depolarizing neuromuscular blockade, contracture of the frog's rectus abdominis muscle, depolarization of the frog sartorius muscle, desensitization, and alteration of the action potential. Later, Thomas et al., (1993) through his work with chicken α_{4}β_{2} nAChR subunits expressed on mouse M 10 cells and chicken α_{7} nAChR expressed in oocytes from Xenopus laevis, showed that anatoxin-a is also a potent agonist of neuronal nAChR.

== Toxicity ==
=== Effects ===
Laboratory studies using mice showed that characteristic effects of acute anatoxin-a poisoning via intraperitoneal injection include muscle fasciculations, tremors, staggering, gasping, respiratory paralysis, and death within minutes. Zebrafish exposed to anatoxin-a contaminated water had altered heart rates.

There have been cases of non-lethal poisoning in humans who have ingested water from streams and lakes that contain various genera of cyanobacteria that are capable of producing anatoxin-a. The effects of non-lethal poisoning were primarily gastrointestinal: nausea, vomiting, diarrhea, and abdominal pain. A case of lethal poisoning was reported in Wisconsin after a teen jumped into a pond contaminated with cyanobacteria.

=== Exposure routes ===
==== Oral ====
Ingestion of drinking water or recreational water that is contaminated with anatoxin-a can pose fatal consequences since anatoxin-a was found to be quickly absorbed through the gastrointestinal tract in animal studies. Dozens of cases of animal deaths due to ingestion of anatoxin-a contaminated water from lakes or rivers have been recorded, and it is suspected to have also been the cause of death of one human. One study found that anatoxin-a is capable of binding to acetylcholine receptors and inducing toxic effects with concentrations in the nano-molar (nM) range if ingested.

==== Dermal ====
Dermal exposure is the most likely form of contact with cyanotoxins in the environment. Recreational exposure to river, stream, and lake waters contaminated with algal blooms has been known to cause skin irritation and rashes. The first study that looked at in vitro cytotoxic effects of anatoxin-a on human skin cell proliferation and migration found that anatoxin-a exerted no effect at 0.1 μg/mL or 1 μg/mL, and a weak toxic effect at 10 μg/mL only after an extended period of contact (48 hours).

==== Inhalation ====
No data on inhalation toxicity of anatoxin-a is currently available, though severe respiratory distress occurred in a water skier after they inhaled water spray containing a fellow cyanobacterial neurotoxin, saxitoxin. It is possible that inhalation of water spray containing anatoxin-a could pose similar consequences.

=== Mechanism of toxicity ===
Anatoxin-a is an agonist of both neuronal α_{4}β_{2} and α_{4} nicotinic acetylcholine receptors present in the CNS as well as the (α_{1})_{2}βγδ muscle-type nAchRs that are present at the neuromuscular junction. (Anatoxin-a has an affinity for these muscle-type receptors that is about 20 times greater than that of acetylcholine.) However, the cyanotoxin has little effect on muscarinic acetylcholine receptors; it has a 100 fold lesser selectivity for these types of receptors than it has for nAchRs. Anatoxin-a also shows much less potency in the CNS than in neuromuscular junctions. In hippocampal and brain stem neurons, a 5 to 10 times greater concentration of anatoxin-a was necessary to activate nAchRs than what was required in the PNS.

In normal circumstances, acetylcholine binds to nAchRs in the post-synaptic neuronal membrane, causing a conformational change in the extracellular domain of the receptor which in turn opens the channel pore. This allows Na^{+} and Ca^{2+} ions to move into the neuron, causing cell depolarization and inducing the generation of action potentials, which allows for muscle contraction. The acetylcholine neurotransmitter then dissociates from the nAchR, where it is rapidly cleaved into acetate and choline by acetylcholinesterase.

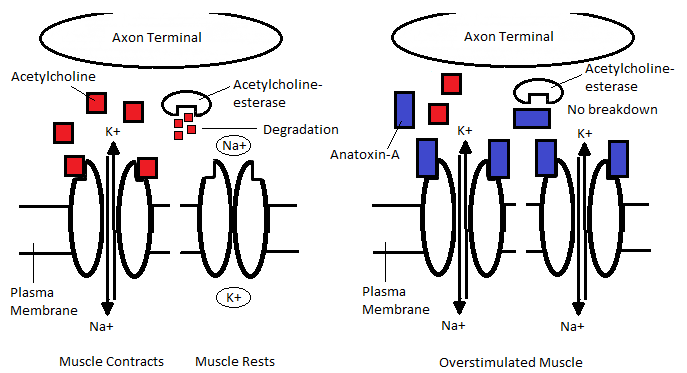
The effects of anatoxin-a on nicotinic acetylcholine receptors at the neuromuscular junction

Anatoxin-a binding to these nAchRs cause the same effects in neurons. However, anatoxin-a binding is irreversible, and the anatoxin-a nAchR complex cannot be broken down by acetylcholinesterase. Thus, the nAchR is temporarily locked open, which leads to overstimulation due to the constant generation of action potentials.

Two enantiomers of anatoxin-a, the positive enantiomer, (+)-anatoxin-a, is 150 fold more potent than the synthetic negative enantiomer, (−)-anatoxin-a.

Respiratory arrest, which results in a lack of an oxygen supply to the brain, is the most evident and lethal effect of anatoxin-a. Injections of mice, rats, birds, dogs, and calves with lethal doses of anatoxin-a have demonstrated that death is preceded by a sequence of muscle fasciculations, decreased movement, collapse, exaggerated abdominal breathing, cyanosis and convulsions. In mice, anatoxin-a also seriously impacted blood pressure and heart rate, and caused severe acidosis.

=== Cases of toxicity ===
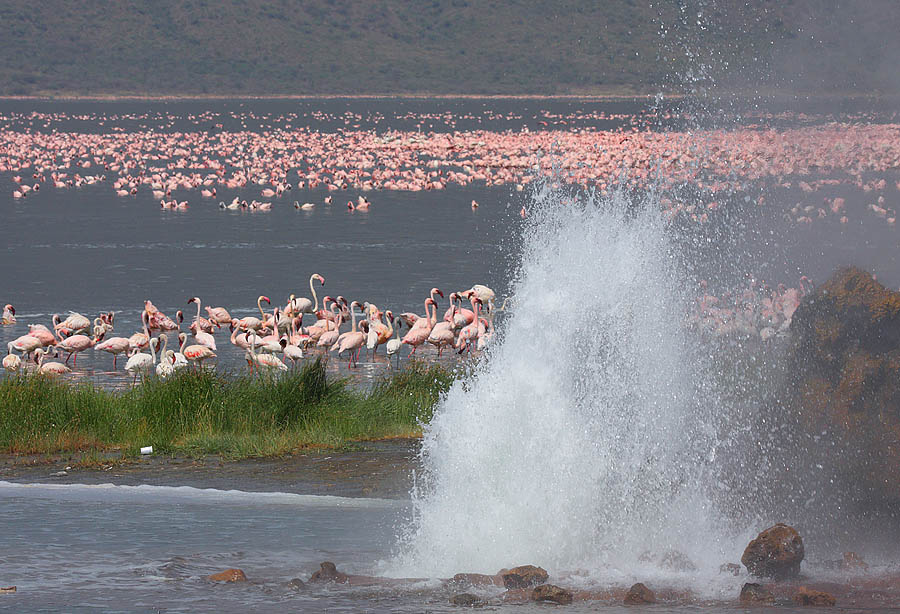
Flamingos at Lake Bogoria

Many cases of wildlife and livestock deaths due to anatoxin-a have been reported since its discovery. Domestic dog deaths due to the cyanotoxin, as determined by analysis of stomach contents, have been observed at the lower North Island in New Zealand in 2005, in eastern France in 2003, in California of the United States in 2002 and 2006, in Scotland in 1992, in Ireland in 1997 and 2005, in Germany in 2017 and 2020. In each case, the dogs began showing muscle convulsions within minutes, and were dead within a matter of hours. Numerous cattle fatalities arising from the consumption of water contaminated with cyanobacteria that produce anatoxin-a have been reported in the United States, Canada, and Finland between 1980 and the present.

A particularly interesting case of anatoxin-a poisoning is that of lesser flamingos at Lake Bogoria in Kenya. The cyanotoxin, which was identified in the stomachs and fecal pellets of the birds, killed roughly 30,000 flamingos in the second half of 1999, and continues to cause mass fatalities annually, devastating the flamingo population. The toxin is introduced into the birds via water contaminated with cyanobacterial mat communities that arise from the hot springs in the lake bed.

== Synthesis ==
=== Laboratory synthesis ===
==== Cyclic expansion of tropanes ====
The first biologically occurring initial substance for tropane expansion into anatoxin-a was cocaine, which has similar stereochemistry to anatoxin-a. Cocaine is first converted into the endo isomer of a cyclopropane, which is then photolytically cleaved to obtain an alpha, beta unsaturated ketone. Through the use of diethyl azodicarboxylate, the ketone is demethylated and anatoxin-a is formed. A similar, more recent synthesis pathway involves producing 2-tropinone from cocaine and treating the product with ethyl chloroformate producing a bicyclic ketone. This product is combined with trimethylsilyldiazylmethane, an organoaluminum Lewis acid and trimethylsinyl enol ether to produce tropinone. This method undergoes several more steps, producing useful intermediates as well as anatoxin-a as a final product.

Cocaine, a precursor for anatoxin-a synthesis

==== Cyclization of cyclooctenes ====
The first and most extensively explored approach used to synthesize anatoxin-a in vitro, cyclooctene cyclization involves 1,5-cyclooctadiene as its initial source. This starting substance is reacted to form methyl amine and combined with hypobromous acid to form anatoxin-a. Another method developed in the same laboratory uses aminoalcohol in conjunction with mercuric (II) acetate and sodium borohydride. The product of this reaction was transformed into an alpha, beta ketone and oxidized by ethyl azodicarboxylate to form anatoxin-a.

==== Enantioselective enolization strategy ====
This method for anatoxin-a production was one of the first used that does not utilize a chimerically analogous starting substance for anatoxin formation. Instead, a racemic mixture of 3-tropinone is used with a chiral lithium amide base and additional ring expansion reactions in order to produce a ketone intermediate. Addition of an organocuprate to the ketone produces an enol triflate derivative, which is then lysed hydrogenously and treated with a deprotecting agent in order to produce anatoxin-a. Similar strategies have also been developed and utilized by other laboratories.

==== Intramolecular cyclization of iminium ions ====
Iminium ion cyclization utilizes several different pathways to create anatoxin-a, but each of these produces and progresses with a pyrrolidine iminium ion. The major differences in each pathway relate to the precursors used to produce the imium ion and the total yield of anatoxin-a at the end of the process. These separate pathways include production of alkyl iminium salts, acyl iminium salts and tosyl iminium salts.

==== Enyne metathesis ====
Enyne metathesis of anatoxin-a involves the use of a ring closing mechanism and is one of the more recent advances in anatoxin-a synthesis. In all methods involving this pathway, pyroglutamic acid is used as a starting material in conjunction with a Grubb's catalyst. Similar to iminium cyclization, the first attempted synthesis of anatoxin-a using this pathway used a 2,5-cis-pyrrolidine as an intermediate.

== Biosynthesis ==
Anatoxin-a is synthesized in vivo in the species Anabaena flos-aquae, as well as several other genera of cyanobacteria. Anatoxin-a and related chemical structures are produced using acetate and glutamate. Further enzymatic reduction of these precursors results in the formation of anatoxin-a. Homoanatoxin, a similar chemical, is produced by Oscillatoria formosa and utilizes the same precursor. However, homoanatoxin undergoes a methyl addition by S-adenosyl-L-methionine instead of an addition of electrons, resulting in a similar analogue. The biosynthetic gene cluster (BGC) for anatoxin-a was described from Oscillatoria PCC 6506 in 2009.

== Stability and degradation ==
Anatoxin-a is unstable in water and other natural conditions, and in the presence of UV light undergoes photodegradation. The photodegradation of anatoxin-a is dependent on pH and sunlight intensity but independent of oxygen, indicating that the degradation by light is not achieved through the process of photo-oxidation.

Studies have shown that some microorganisms are capable of degrading anatoxin-a. A study done by Kiviranta and colleagues in 1991 showed that the bacterial genus Pseudomonas was capable of degrading anatoxin-a at a rate of 2–10 μg/ml per day. Later experiments done by Rapala and colleagues (1994) supported these results. They compared the effects of sterilized and non-sterilized sediments on anatoxin-a degradation over the course of 22 days, and found that after that time vials with the sterilized sediments showed similar levels of anatoxin-a as at the commencement of the experiment, while vials with non-sterilized sediment showed a 25-48% decrease.

== Detection ==
There are two categories of anatoxin-a detection methods. Biological methods have involved administration of samples to mice and other organisms more commonly used in ecotoxicological testing, such as brine shrimp (Artemia salina), larvae of the freshwater crustacean Thamnocephalus platyurus, and various insect larvae. Problems with this methodology include an inability to determine whether it is anatoxin-a or another neurotoxin that causes the resulting deaths. Large amounts of sample material are also needed for such testing. In addition to the biological methods, scientists have used chromatography to detect anatoxin-a. This is complicated by the rapid degradation of the toxin and the lack of commercially available standards for anatoxin-a.

== Public health ==
Despite the relatively low frequency of anatoxin-a relative to other cyanotoxins, its high toxicity (the lethal dose is not known for humans, but is estimated to be less than 5 mg for an adult male) means that it is still considered a serious threat to terrestrial and aquatic organisms, most significantly to livestock and to humans. Anatoxin-a is suspected to have been involved in the death of at least one person. The threat posed by anatoxin-a and other cyanotoxins is increasing as both fertilizer runoff, leading to eutrophication in lakes and rivers, and higher global temperatures contribute to a greater frequency and prevalence of cyanobacterial blooms.

=== Water regulations ===
The World Health Organization in 1999 and EPA in 2006 both came to the conclusion that there was not enough toxicity data for anatoxin-a to establish a formal tolerable daily intake (TDI) level, though some places have implemented levels of their own.

==== United States ====
===== Drinking water advisory levels =====
Anatoxin-a is not regulated under the Safe Drinking Water Act, but states are allowed to create their own standards for contaminants that are unregulated. Currently there are four states that have set drinking water advisory levels for anatoxin-a as seen in the table below. On October 8, 2009 the EPA published the third Drinking Water Contaminant Candidate List (CCL) which included anatoxin-a (among other cyanotoxins), indicating that anatoxin-a may be present in public water systems but is not regulated by the EPA. Anatoxin-a's presence on the CCL means that it may need to be regulated by the EPA in the future, pending further information on its health effects in humans.

Drinking Water Advisory Levels
State	Concentration (μg/L)
Minnesota	0.1
Ohio	20
Oregon	0.7
Vermont	0.5

===== Recreational water advisory levels =====
In 2008 the state of Washington implemented a recreational advisory level for anatoxin-a of 1 μg/L in order to better manage algal blooms in lakes and protect users from exposure to the blooms.

==== Canada ====
The Canadian province of Québec has a drinking water Maximum Accepted Value for anatoxin-a of 3.7 μg/L.

==== New Zealand ====
New Zealand has a drinking water Maximum Accepted Value for anatoxin-a of 6 μg/L.

=== Water treatment ===
As of now, there is no official guideline level for anatoxin-a, although scientists estimate that a level of 1 μg l^{−1} would be sufficiently low. Likewise, there are no official guidelines regarding testing for anatoxin-a. Among methods of reducing the risk for cyanotoxins, including anatoxin-a, scientists look favorably on biological treatment methods because they do not require complicated technology, are low maintenance, and have low running costs. Few biological treatment options have been tested for anatoxin-a specifically, although a species of Pseudomonas, capable of biodegrading anatoxin-a at a rate of 2–10 μg ml^{−1} d^{−1}, has been identified. Biological (granular) activated carbon (BAC) has also been tested as a method of biodegradation, but it is inconclusive whether biodegradation occurred or if anatoxin-a was simply adsorbing the activated carbon. Others have called for additional studies to determine more about how to use activated carbon effectively.

Chemical treatment methods are more common in drinking water treatment compared to biological treatment, and numerous processes have been suggested for anatoxin-a. Oxidants such as potassium permanganate, ozone, and advanced oxidation processes (AOPs) have worked in lowering levels of anatoxin-a, but others, including photocatalysis, UV photolysis, and chlorination, have not shown great efficacy.

Directly removing the cyanobacteria in the water treatment process through physical treatment (e.g., membrane filtration) is another option because most of the anatoxin-a is contained within the cells when the bloom is growing. However, anatoxin-a is released from cyanobacteria into water when they senesce and lyse, so physical treatment may not remove all of the anatoxin-a present. Additional research needs to be done to find more reliable and efficient methods of both detection and treatment.

== Laboratory uses ==
Anatoxin-a is a very powerful nicotinic acetylcholine receptor agonist and as such has been extensively studied for medicinal purposes. It is mainly used as a pharmacological probe in order to investigate diseases characterized by low acetylcholine levels, such as muscular dystrophy, myasthenia gravis, Alzheimer's disease, and Parkinson's disease. Further research on anatoxin-a and other less potent analogues are being tested as possible replacements for acetylcholine.

== Genera of cyanobacteria that produce anatoxin-a ==
- Anabaena (Dolichospermum)
- Aphanizomenon
- Cylindrospermopsis
- Cylindrospermum
- Lyngbya
- Microcystis
- Nostoc
- Oscillatoria
- Microcoleus (Phormidium)
- Planktothrix
- Raphidiopsis
- Tychonema
- Woronichinia

== See also ==
- Guanitoxin
- Epibatidine
