= SYL =

SYL may refer to:

- Strapping Young Lad, a Canadian heavy metal band
  - Strapping Young Lad (album), 2003
- Somali Youth League
- South Yemeni League
- Socialist Youth League (disambiguation), a number of groups with that name
- National Union of University Students in Finland (Finnish: SYL, Suomen ylioppilaskuntien liitto, Swedish: Finlands studentkårers förbund, FSF)
- Sutlej Yamuna link canal (SYL canal) in India
- "SYL" (song), a song by Indian singer, rapper Sidhu Moose Wala
- Scottish Young Labour, the youth wing of the Scottish Labour Party
- Syahrul Yasin Limpo, Indonesian politician
- Syon Lane railway station, London, England, National Rail station code
- Sylheti language, an Eastern Indo-Aryan language, ISO 639-3 code
- Yakutia Airlines, ICAO code

== See also ==
- Syl, a given name or nickname
