= Palm Island mystery disease =

1979 illness outbreak in Queensland, Australia

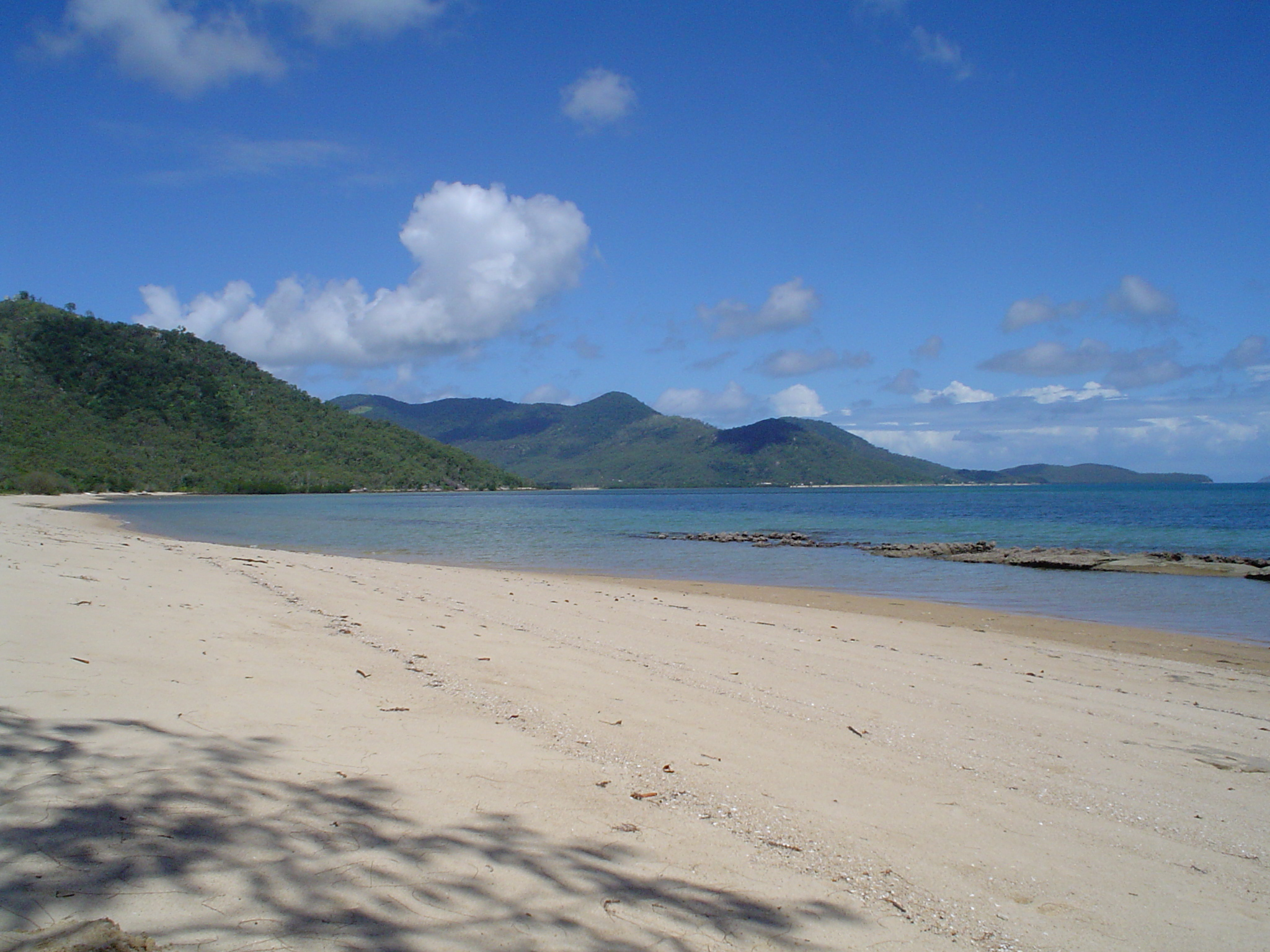
View of Palm Island from Wallaby Point

The Palm Island mystery disease, also known as hepatoenteritis and hepato-enteritis, was an outbreak of a hepatitis-like illness on Great Palm Island, Queensland, reported in 1979, associated in many cases with dehydration and bloody diarrhea. 148 people (138 children and 10 adults) of Aboriginal and Torres Strait Islander descent were affected.

== Causes ==
The cause of the outbreak was determined to be the addition of excessive doses of copper sulfate to the water supply of Solomon Dam, which had been added to target a cyanobacteria bloom of Cylindrospermopsis raciborskii. The excessive dosing was following the use of least-cost contractors, who were unqualified in the field, to control the algae.

Toxins from the cyanobacteria itself had also been described as a possible cause.

Early suggestions included toxocariasis.

== Presentation ==
Symptoms of hepatoenteritis included diarrhoea, vomiting attacks, loss of balance and disorientation.

The perinatal effects of cyanobacteria contamination of drinking water include prematurity, low birth weight and congenital defects detected at birth. In 1996 there were 63 deaths attributed to drinking water contamination in Caruaru, Brazil.

== See also ==
- Cyanotoxin
- Cylindrospermopsis raciborskii
