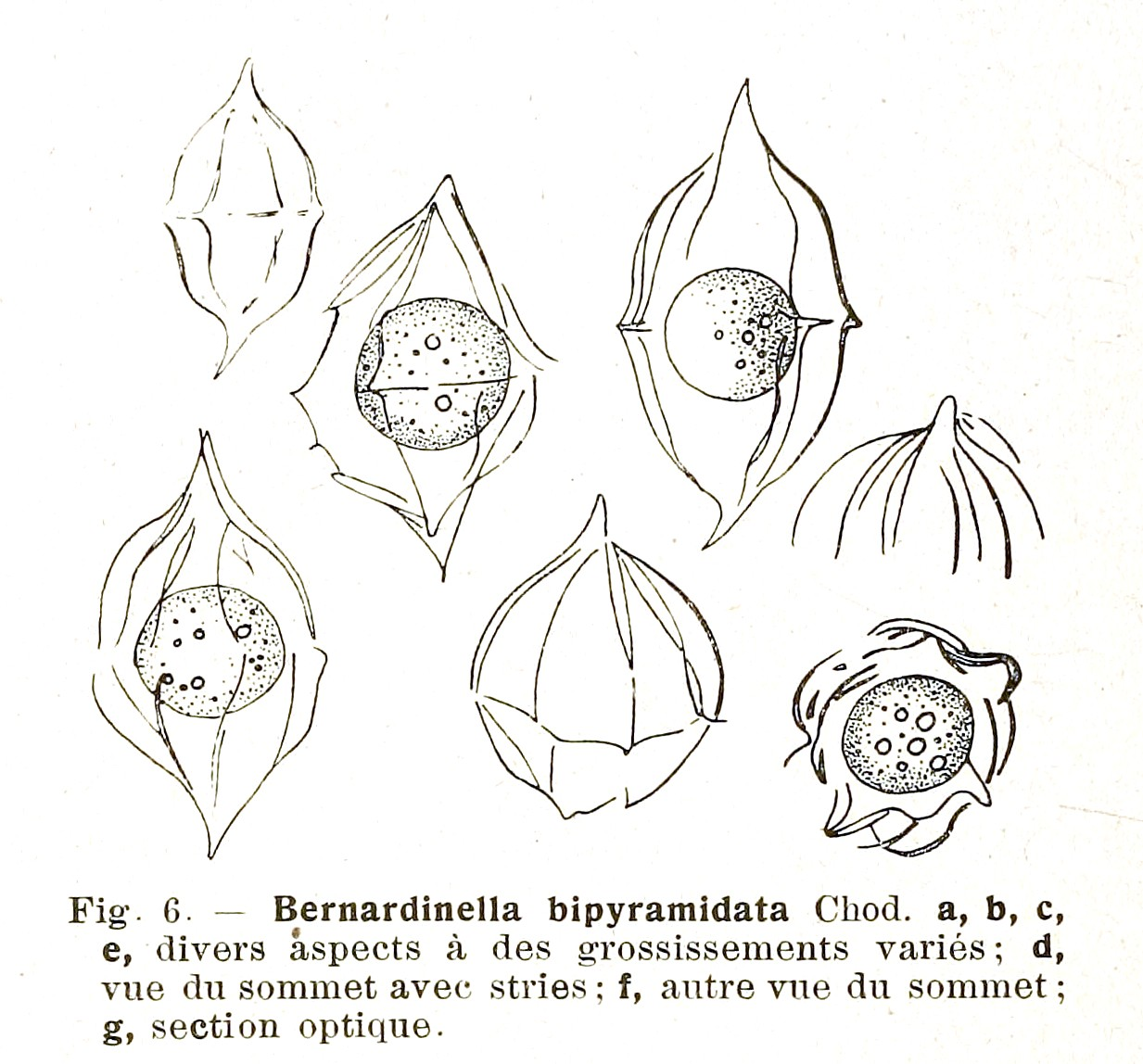
- Desmatractum bipyramidatum

Scientific classification
- Clade: Viridiplantae
- Division: Chlorophyta
- Class: Chlorophyceae
- Order: Chlamydomonadales
- Family: incertae sedis
- Genus: Desmatractum; West & G.S.West, 1902

Type species
- Desmatractum plicatum West & G.S.West

Species
- Desmatractum bipyramidatum (Chodat) Pascher; Desmatractum delicatissimum Korshikov; Desmatractum elongatum Pascher; Desmatractum indutum (Geitler) Pascher; Desmatractum nyanzae (Woloszynska) G.S.West ex Printz; Desmatractum obtusum Pascher; Desmatractum plicatum West & G.S.West; Desmatractum spryii Nicholls

Synonyms
- Bernardinella Choda, 1925; Peniococcus Wołoszyńska, 1914

= Desmatractum =

Genus of algae

Desmatractum is a genus of green algae, in the order Chlamydomonadales. It is found in freshwater habitats such as ponds, ditches, and bogs as plankton or metaphyton. The genus is cosmopolitan, but some species are very rare.

== Description ==
Desmatractum is microscopic and consists of single cells. The cells are spherical or ellipsoidal, and are surrounded by a cell envelope that tapers at both ends, making the form overall spindle-shaped. The envelope has 4 to 20 longitudinal ridges, and may be constricted at the equator. The chloroplast is parietally located and contains one or two pyrenoid.

Species are distinguished from each other by the overall shape and size of the cells, as well as the degree of longitudinal ribbing of the cell envelopes. Species that appear similar in the light microscope have very different ultrastructures, and this may be a sign that taxonomic revision is necessary.

Reproduction occurs asexually, where the protoplast divides into four zoospores which are then released through a tear in the cell envelope. Zoospores are oval or elongate, with a single chloroplast and eyespot, as well as two identical anterior flagella. Sexual reproduction has not been observed in Desmatractum.
