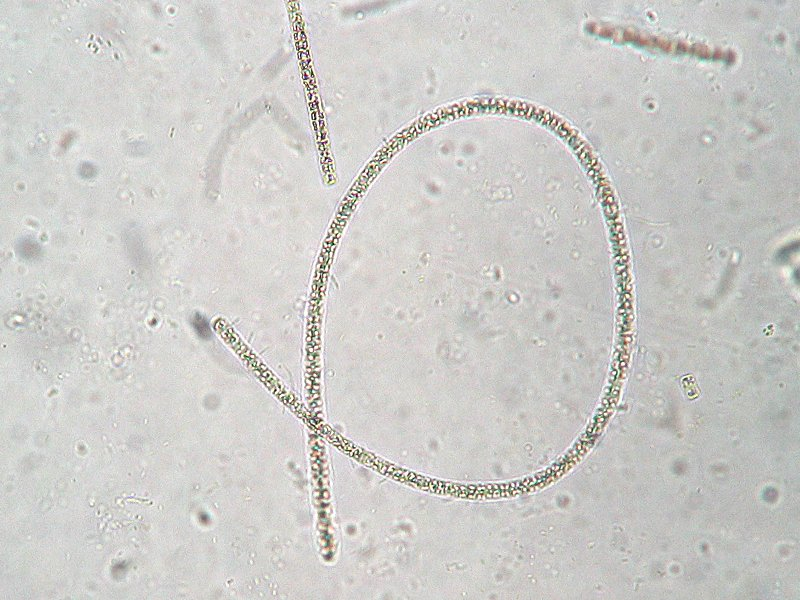
- Planktothrix rubescens

Scientific classification
- Domain: Bacteria
- Kingdom: Bacillati
- Phylum: Cyanobacteriota
- Class: Cyanophyceae
- Order: Oscillatoriales
- Family: Microcoleaceae
- Genus: Planktothrix; Anagnostidis & Komárek, 1988

= Planktothrix =

Genus of bacteria

Planktothrix is a diverse genus of filamentous cyanobacteria observed to amass in algal blooms in water ecosystems across the globe. Like all Oscillatoriales, Planktothrix species have no heterocysts and no akinetes. Planktothrix are unique because they have trichomes and contain gas vacuoles unlike typical planktonic organisms. Previously, some species of the taxon were grouped within the genus Oscillatoria, but recent work has defined Planktothrix as its own genus. A tremendous body of work on Planktothrix ecology and physiology has been done by Anthony E. Walsby, and the 55.6 kb microcystin synthetase gene which gives these organisms the ability to synthesize toxins has been sequenced. P. agardhii is an example of a type species of the genus. P. agardhii and P. rubescens are commonly observed in lakes of the Northern Hemisphere where they are known producers of potent hepatotoxins called microcystins.

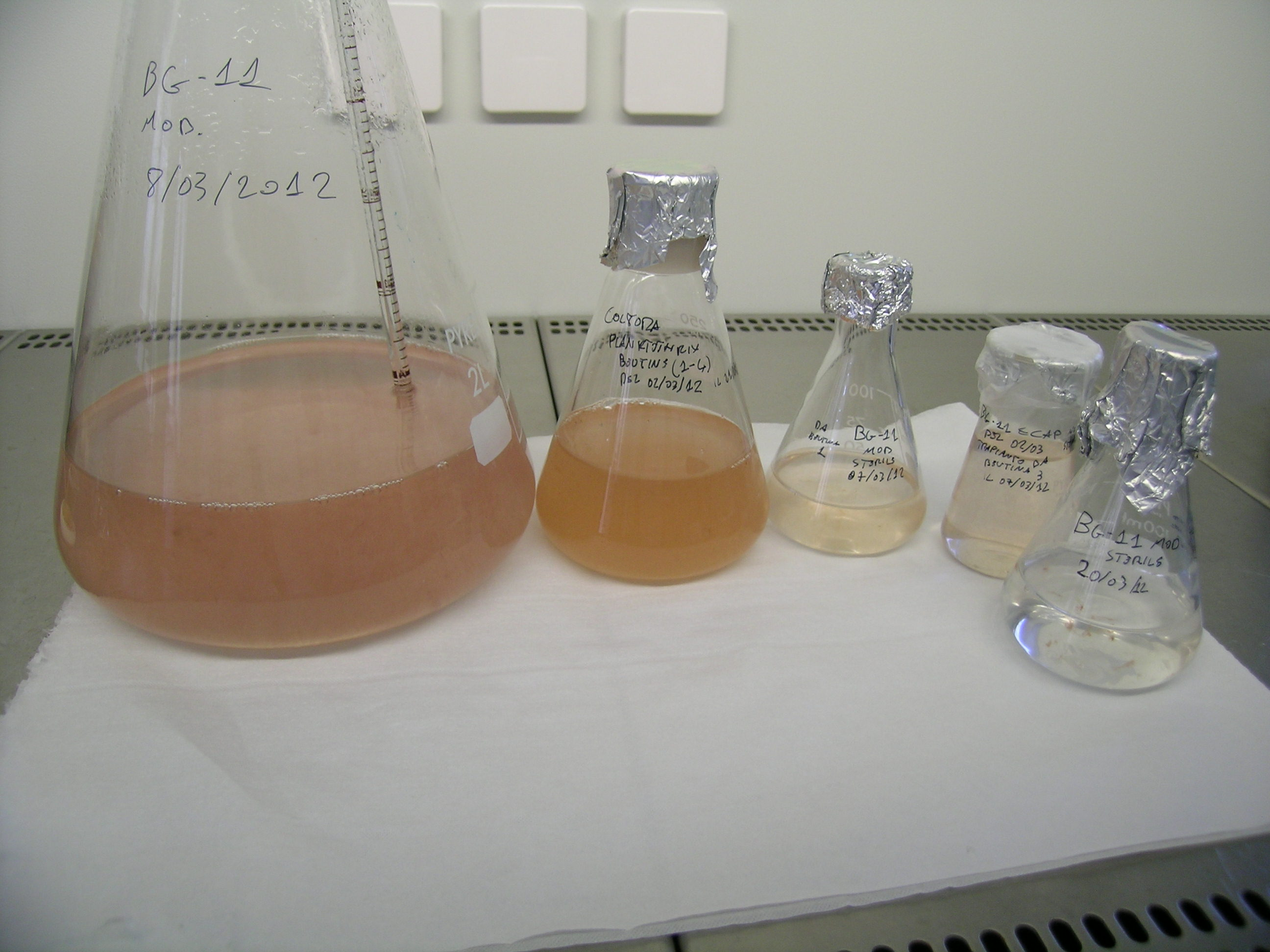
Planktothrix rubescens culture. Note the reddish brown color which gave this strain's algal blooms the name "Burgundy-blood phenomenon"

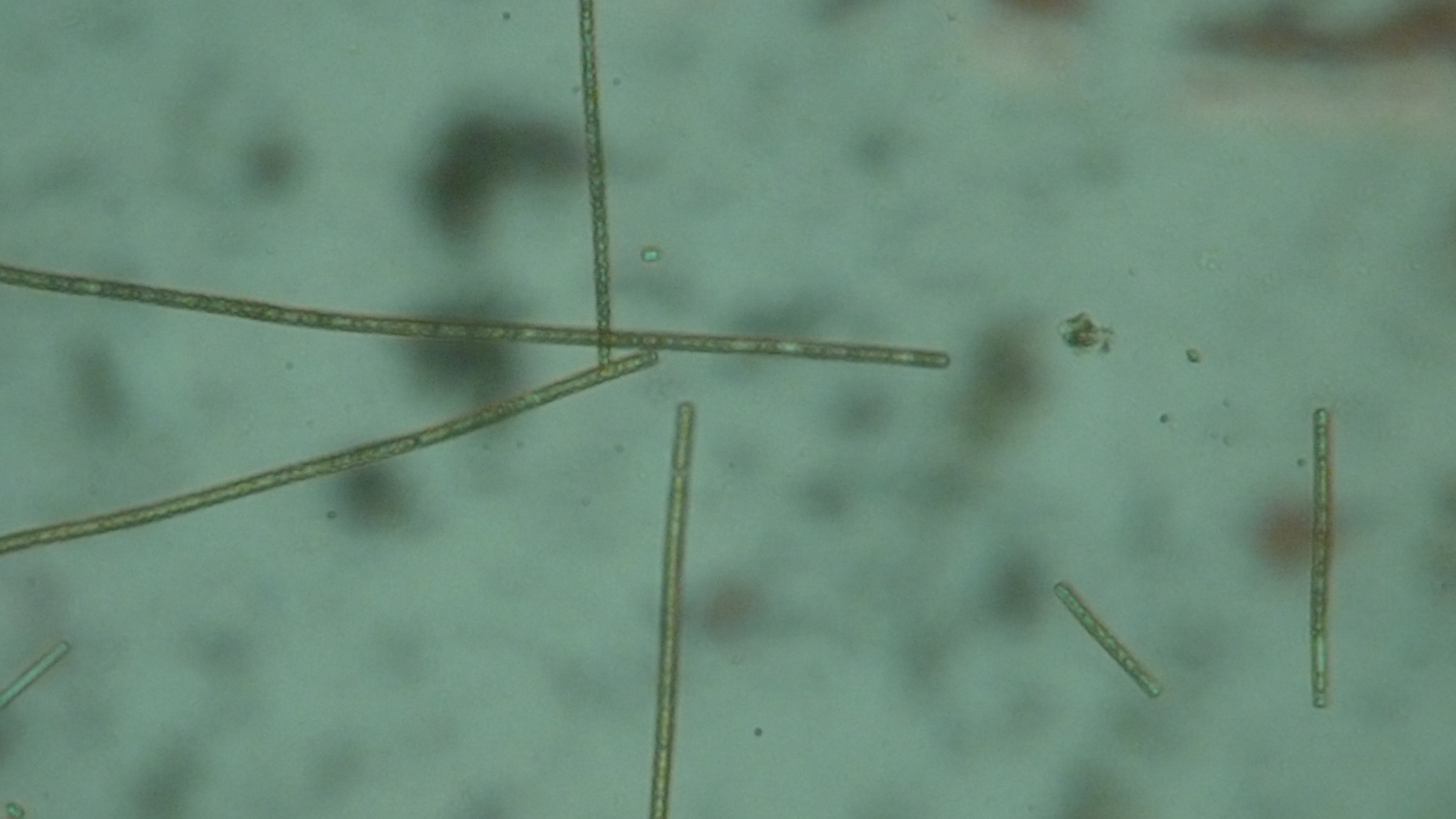
Planktothrix rubescens

== Habitats and niches ==
Both P. agardhii and P. rubescens have the ability to form massive blooms in freshwater lakes and reservoirs. The whole genus has been studied to thrive in various temperate to subtropical water ecosystems in Europe, Asia, Africa and Australia. P. agardhii is commonly found at most latitudes in shallow and turbid lakes where it can tolerate continuous mixing of the water column. P. rubescens is regularly found in clear, deep alpine and pre-alpine lakes that are seasonally stratified. P. agardhii grows in the low light conditions of the metalimnion where it can maximize the absorption of green light with its phycoerythrin pigments. Under the action of wind-induced internal waves, P. rubescens can be moved vertically by several meters following the movements of the metalimnion, which in turn modifies rapidly (within a day) the light conditions experienced by the filaments. This was shown to significantly affect the photosynthesis rate and oxygen production especially in lakes where the dominant organism of the phytoplankton community is P. rubescens such as in Lake Zurich.

== Characteristics ==
The various strains of Planktothrix can be characterized as planktic, benthic, or biphasic based on their lifestyles and at what depth in the water they are found. The various species can not only be differentiated by their preferred habitat type but also by their morphology and pigmentation. For example, the blue green pigmented species P. agardhii possess phycocyanins giving its color. At the same time, outbreaks of P. rubescens are known as the "Burgundy-blood phenomenon" in reference to its reddish pigmentation. Different strains prefer climates ranging from temperate to subtropic. Planktothrix grows by cell division in a single plane to form unbranched structures of average length around 4 μm, but unlike other Oscillatoriales, these trichomes are phototactic. Typically, Planktothrix filaments do not have specialized cells such as akinetes or heterocysts, and do not produce mucilaginous envelopes, except for some rare species but only under stress conditions. Several species possess a constant ratio of their two main photosynthetic pigments, i.e., phycocyanins and phycoerythrins. The production of cyanotoxins is facultative, and strains that do not produce microcystins are commonly found in nature. Apart from microcystins, they can produce several other cyclic peptides including oscillapeptin J. Planktothrix organisms house gas vesicles called protoplasts which play an important role in their buoyancy as the gas within the vesicle is nearly only one tenth the density of water making the organism less dense overall.

== Taxonomy ==
The Plantothrix genus emerged as a cyanobacteria observed to form blooms at the surface of freshwater and organisms with the current classification were once categorized under the genus Oscillatoria.

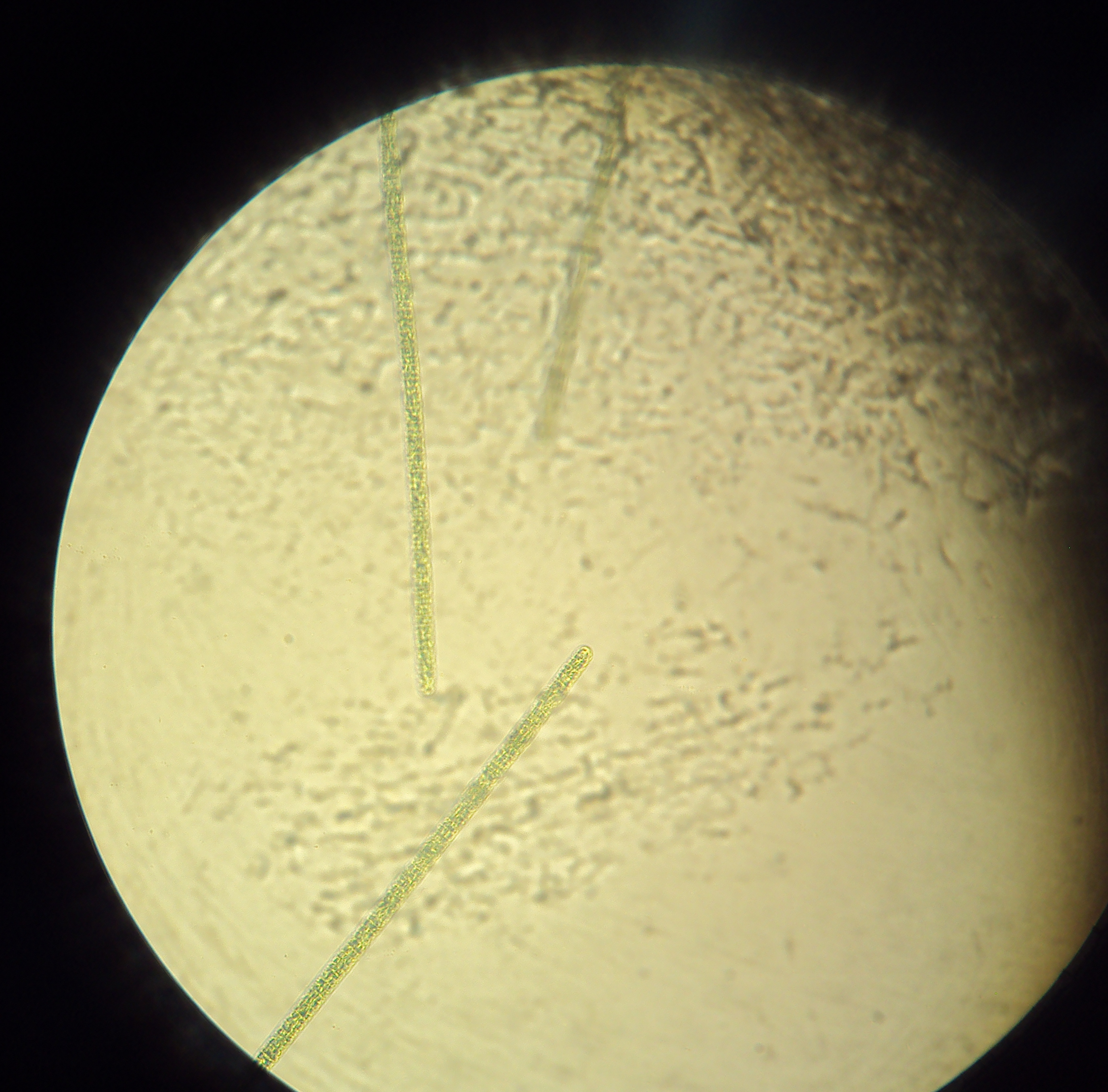
Planktothrix agardhii

== Mechanisms and toxicology ==
Planktothrix organisms are able to store nitrogen as a co-polymer of aspartate and arginine which allows them to survive even under limited nitrogen supply from the atmosphere. This mechanism is also what allows thick blooms to prosper as the thicker the bloom, deeper Planktothrix are exposed to less light and atmospheric air. The increasing impact of algal blooms has been theorized to be connected to global warming caused by human activity. Harmful algal blooms caused by not only Planktothrix but also other forms of cyanobacteria including Dolichospermum (Anabaena) or Microcystis have correlation to toxic effects for humans leading to devastating impacts to agriculture. Planktothrix have the ability to produce cyanotoxins including microcystins, anatoxins, and saxitoxins.

== Strains ==
- P. agardhii (Gomont) Anagnostidis et Komárek 1988
- P. rubescens (de Candolle ex Gomont) Anagnostidis et Komárek 1988
- P. isothrix (Skuja) Komárek et Komárková 2004
- P. prolifica
- P. mougeotii
- P. paucivesiculata
- P. pseudagardhii
- P. spiroides
- P. serta
- P. tepida

== See also ==
- Algal blooms
- Anabaena
- Microcystins
- Microcystis
