= Planktothrix agardhii =

Scientific classification
- Domain: Bacteria
- Phylum: Cyanobacteria
- Class: Cyanophyceae
- Order: Oscillatoriales
- Family: Microcoleaceae
- Genus: Planktothrix
- Species: P. agardhii

Binomial name
- Planktothrix agardhii (Gomont) Anag. & Komar

Species of bacterium

Planktothrix agardhii is a species of cyanobacteria belonging to the family Oscillatoriaceae.

It has cosmopolitan distribution.
