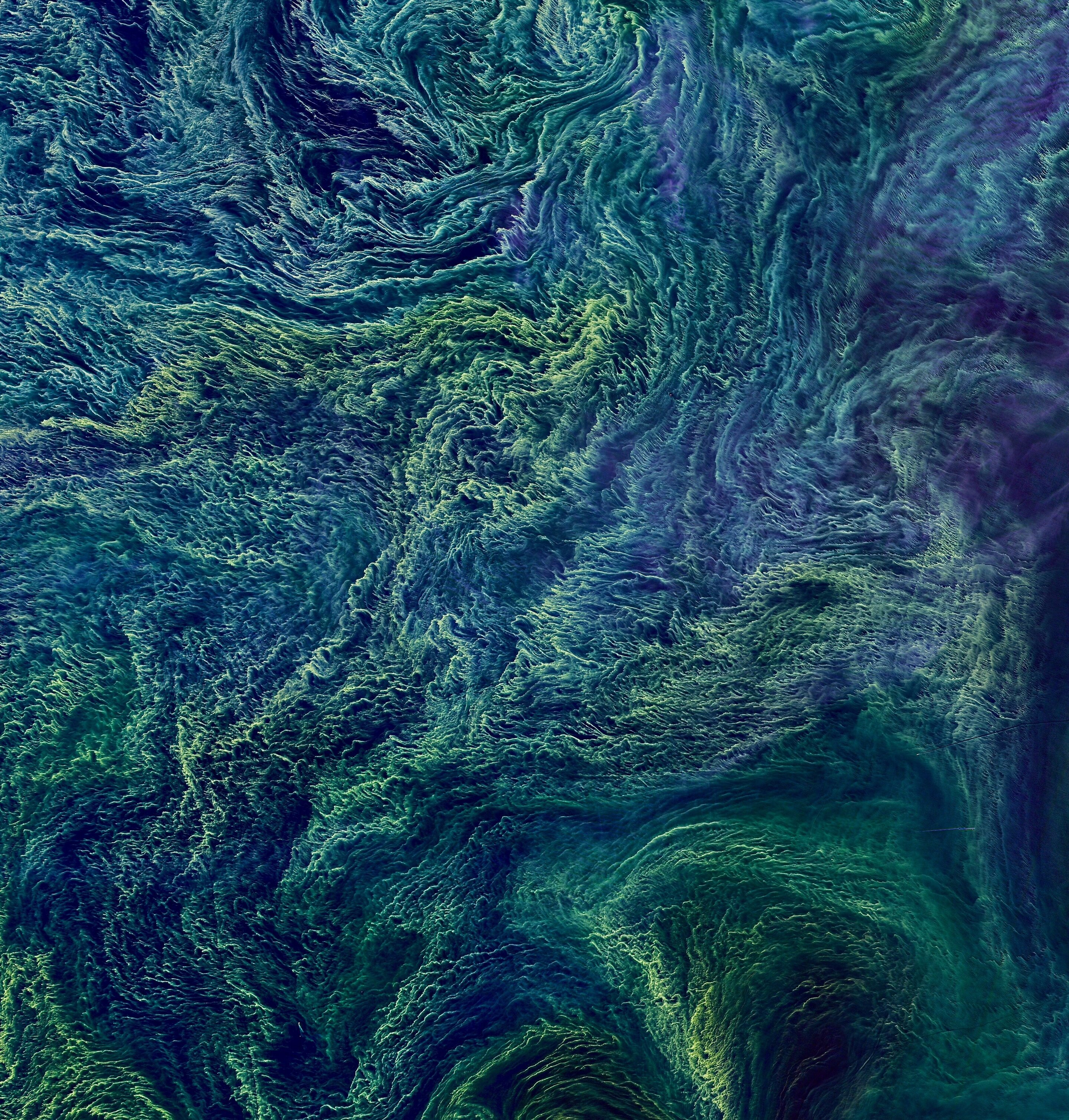
- Satellite image of a large bloom of Nodularia swirling in the Baltic Sea

Scientific classification
- Domain: Bacteria
- Kingdom: Bacillati
- Phylum: Cyanobacteriota
- Class: Cyanophyceae
- Order: Nostocales
- Family: Aphanizomenonaceae
- Genus: Nodularia; Mertens 1822

Species
- Nodularia armorica Nodularia harveyana Nodularia sphaerocarpa Nodularia spumigena

= Nodularia =

Genus of bacteria

Nodularia is a genus of filamentous nitrogen-fixing cyanobacteria, or blue-green algae. They occur mainly in brackish or salinic waters, such as the hypersaline Makgadikgadi Pans, the Peel-Harvey Estuary in Western Australia or the Baltic Sea. Nodularia cells occasionally form heavy algal blooms. Some strains produce a cyanotoxin called nodularin R, which is harmful to humans.

The type species for the genus is Nodularia spumigena Mertens ex Bornet & Flahault, 1886.

== Morphology ==
Nodularia may form solitary filaments or groups of filaments. They reproduce by the formation of hormogonia, filament breakage, and by akinetes.

== Recent evolution ==
As climate change influenced the local sea surface temperature, N. spumigena in the Baltic Sea changed their photosynthetic optimum temperature too. This was revealed by a sediment core from the Eastern Gotland Basin corresponding to 1987–2020, providing strains of N. spumigena that were revived and tested in the lab.

== See also ==
Kruger, T., Oelmuller, R., and Luckas, B. (2009) Comparative PCR analysis of toxic Nodularia spumigena and non-toxic Nodularia harveyana (Nostocales, Cyanobacteria) with respect to the nodularia synthetase gene cluster. Eur. J. Phycol. 44 (3): 291 - 295.
