= Guanitoxin =

Names
- IUPAC name (5S)-5-[(Dimethylamino)methyl]-1-{[hydroxy(methoxy)phosphoryl]oxy}-4,5-dihydro-1H-imidazol-2-amine

Identifiers
CAS Number	103170-78-1
3D model (JSmol)	Interactive image
ChemSpider	102921
KEGG	C19998
PubChem CID	114989
UNII	4258P76E76
CompTox Dashboard (EPA)	DTXSID20897217
- InChI: InChI=1S/C7H17N4O4P/c1-10(2)5-6-4-9-7(8)11(6)15-16(12,13)14-3/h6H,4-5H2,1-3H3,(H2,8,9)(H,12,13)/t6-/m1/s1 Key: FYXHGVMFJYHPFX-ZCFIWIBFSA-N
- SMILES: CN(C)C[C@H]1CN=C(N1OP(=O)(O)OC)N

Properties
Chemical formula	C_{7}H_{17}N_{4}O_{4}P
Molar mass	252.211 g·mol^{−1}
- Except where otherwise noted, data are given for materials in their standard state (at 25 °C [77 °F], 100 kPa). Infobox references

Guanitoxin (GNT), formerly known as anatoxin-a(S) "Salivary" (Note: (The "(S)" its name stands for 'salivary' indicating its manner of affliction to distinguish it from a toxin having otherwise the same conventional name. cf. "See also" for aforementioned compound of shared nomenclature.)), is a naturally occurring cyanotoxin commonly isolated from cyanobacteria (specifically of the genus Anabaena). It is a potent covalent acetylcholinesterase inhibitor, and thus a potent rapid acting neurotoxin which in cases of severe exposure can lead to death. Guanitoxin was first structurally characterized in 1989, and consists of a cyclic N-hydroxyguanidine organophosphate with a phosphate ester moiety.

== Toxicity and treatment ==
The main mechanism of action for guanitoxin is by irreversibly inhibiting the active site of acetylcholinesterase leading to excess acetylcholine in the parasympathetic and peripheral nervous systems; inducing poisoning via nicotinic and muscarinic cholinergic receptor stimulation. The clinical signs of high level guanitoxin exposure consists mainly of excessive salivation, lacrimation, chromodacryorrhea (in rats), urinary incontinence, muscular weakness, muscle twitching, convulsion, including opisthotonus, and respiratory distress and/or failure, and death.

Treatment of afflicted case by atropine has attested to suppress the muscarinic mediated toxicity; which prevents the namesake salivation that similarly reacts to prevent the toxin's other poisoning symptoms which include lacrimation, urinary incontinence and defecation. Atropine will not, however, counter another mechanism of the compounds toxicity as it also mediates a nicotinic adverse toxicity affecting muscle tremors, fasciculation, convulsions and respiratory failure.

== Stability and degradation ==
Guanitoxin is generally labile. It decomposes rapidly in basic solutions, but is relatively stable in neutral or acidic solutions (pH 3-5). When stored at -20˚C, it slowly undergoes hydrolysis giving pre-guanitoxin N-oxide and monomethyl-phosphate, and more slowly, formation of pre-guanitoxin. Furthermore, air evaporation of guanitoxin solutions resulted in significant hydrolysis to pre-guanitoxin N-oxide.

Scheme for guanitoxin degradation. Major microspecies at pH 7.4 are shown.

== See also ==
- Anatoxin-a – a cyanotoxin that shares some clinical exposure signs, and also relates to the same cyanobacteria genera, but with a different chemical structure and toxic mechanism of action
- Paraoxon – A synthetic pesticide with an analogous mechanism of action
