= Syl =

Syl is a given name, typically but not always a shortened form of Sylvia, Sylvester, Sylvain, and Sylvanus. Notable people with the name include:

- Syl Anderton, British motorcycle dealer and racer
- Syl Apps (1915–1998), Canadian pole vaulter and hockey player
- Syl Apps, Jr. (born 1947), Canadian hockey player
- Syl Apps III (born 1976), American hockey player
- Syl Cheney-Coker (born 1945), Sierra Leonean poet, novelist, and journalist
- Syl Johnson (born 1936), American blues and soul singer
- Syl Johnson (baseball) (1900–1985), American baseball pitcher
- Syl Simon (1897–1973), American baseball player

== Fictional characters ==
- Syl (comics), from DC Comics
- Syl, from Star Trek Beyond

== See also ==
- Sylheti language (ISO 639-3 code)
- Cyl (disambiguation)
