= Saskatchewan Lake =

Lake in Ontario, Canada

- Location within Ontario
- Location: Ontario
- Coordinates: 45.132°N 78.778°W
- Basin countries: Canada

Saskatchewan Lake is a small lake in Haliburton County, Ontario, Canada.

== See also ==
- List of lakes in Ontario
