= Cyanotoxin =

Toxin produced by cyanobacteria

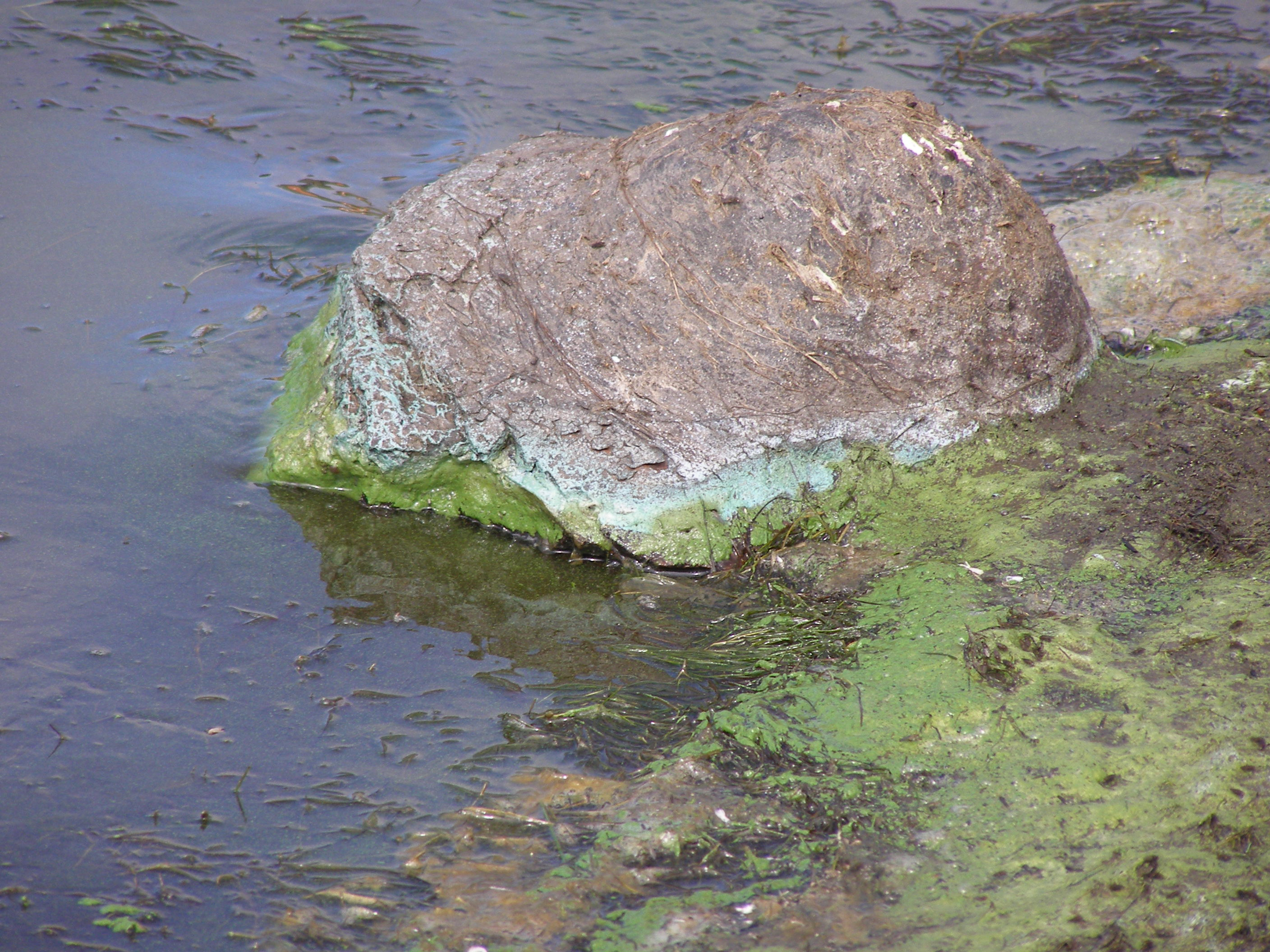
Green scum produced by and containing cyanobacteria, washed up on a rock in California during an algal bloom

Cyanotoxins are toxins produced by cyanobacteria (also known as blue-green algae). Cyanobacteria are found almost everywhere, but particularly in lakes and in the ocean where, under high concentration of phosphorus conditions, they reproduce exponentially to form blooms. Blooming cyanobacteria can produce cyanotoxins in such concentrations that they can poison and even kill animals and humans. Cyanotoxins can also accumulate in other animals such as fish and shellfish, and cause poisonings such as shellfish poisoning.

Some of the most powerful natural poisons known are cyanotoxins. They include potent neurotoxins, hepatotoxins, cytotoxins, and endotoxins. The cyano in the term cyanobacteria refers to its colour, not to its relation to cyanides, though cyanobacteria can catabolize hydrogen cyanide during nitrogen fixation.

Exposure to cyanobacteria can result in gastro-intestinal and hayfever symptoms or pruritic skin rashes. Exposure to the cyanobacteria neurotoxin BMAA may be an environmental cause of neurodegenerative diseases such as amyotrophic lateral sclerosis (ALS), Parkinson's disease, and Alzheimer's disease. There is also an interest in the military potential of biological neurotoxins such as cyanotoxins, which "have gained increasing significance as potential candidates for weaponization."

The first published report that blue-green algae or cyanobacteria could have lethal effects appeared in Nature in 1878. George Francis described the algal bloom he observed in the estuary of the Murray River in Australia, as "a thick scum like green oil paint, some two to six inches thick." Wildlife which drank the water died rapidly and terribly. Most reported incidents of poisoning by microalgal toxins have occurred in freshwater environments, and they are becoming more common and widespread. For example, thousands of ducks and geese died drinking contaminated water in the midwestern United States. In 2010, for the first time, marine mammals were reported to have died from ingesting cyanotoxins.From July 2026, the WHO has set health guidelines for several key cyanotoxins like microcystins, anatoxin-a, cylindrospermopsins and saxitoxin, emphasizing that they must be monitored and managed through more thorough drinking water safety plans.

== Background ==
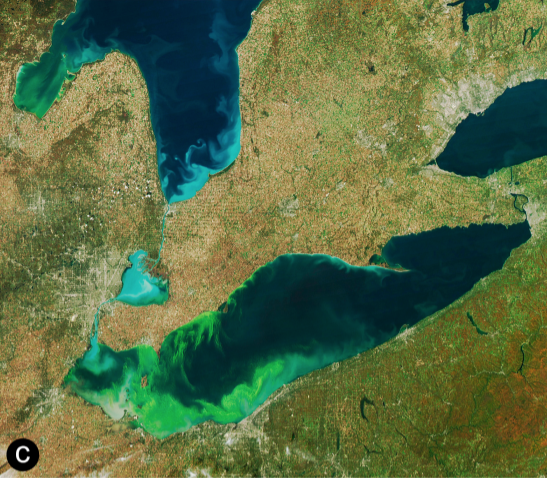
Satellite image of cyanobacteria bloom in the Great Lakes

Cyanobacteria are ecologically one of the most prolific groups of phototrophic prokaryotes in both marine and freshwater habitats. Both the beneficial and detrimental aspects of cyanobacteria are of considerable significance. They are important primary producers as well as an immense source of several secondary products, including an array of toxic compounds known as cyanotoxins. Abundant growth of cyanobacteria in freshwater, estuarine, and coastal ecosystems due to increased anthropogenic eutrophication and global climate change has created serious concern toward harmful bloom formation and surface water contamination.

Cyanobacteria are considered the oldest groups of photosynthetic prokaryotes and possibly appeared on the Earth about 3.5 billion years ago. They are ubiquitous in nature and thrive in a variety of ecological niches ranging from desert to hot springs and ice-cold water. Cyanobacteria are an immense source of several secondary natural products with applications in the food, pharmaceuticals, cosmetics, agriculture, and energy sectors. Moreover, some species of cyanobacteria grow vigorously and form a dominant microflora in terms of their biomass and productivity in specific ecosystems. Bloom formations due to excessive growth of certain cyanobacteria followed by the production of toxic compounds have been reported in many eutrophic to hypertrophic lakes, ponds, and rivers throughout the world.

A range of toxic secondary compounds, called cyanotoxins, have been reported from cyanobacteria inhabiting freshwater and marine ecosystems. These toxic compounds are highly detrimental for survival of several aquatic organisms, wild and/or domestic animals, and humans. Aquatic organisms, including plants and animals, as well as phytoplankton and zooplankton inhabiting under toxic bloom rich ecosystems, are directly exposed to the harmful effects of different cyanotoxins. The intoxication occurring in wild and/or domestic animals and humans is either due to direct ingestion of cells of toxin producing cyanobacteria or the consumption of drinking water contaminated with cyanotoxins. The toxicity of different cyanotoxins is directly proportional to the growth of cyanobacteria and the extent of their toxin production. It has been shown that the growth of different cyanobacteria and their toxin biosynthesis is greatly influenced by different abiotic factors such as light intensity, temperature, short wavelength radiations, pH, and nutrients. Global warming and temperature gradients can significantly change species composition and favor blooms of toxic phytoplanktons.

It has been assumed that cyanotoxins play an important role in chemical defense mechanisms giving survival advantages to the cyanobacteria over other microbes or deterring predation by higher trophic levels. Cyanotoxins may also take part in chemical signalling.

Cyanobacteria are found almost everywhere; in oceans, lakes and rivers as well as on land. They flourish in Arctic and Antarctic lakes, hotsprings and wastewater treatment plants. They even inhabit the fur of polar bears, to which they impart a greenish tinge. Cyanobacteria produce potent toxins, but they also produce helpful bioactive compounds, including substances with antitumour, antiviral, anticancer, antibiotic and antifungal activity, UV protectants and specific inhibitors of enzymes.

Cyanotoxins are produced by cyanobacteria, a phylum of bacteria that obtain their energy through photosynthesis. The prefix cyan comes from the Greek κύανoς meaning "a dark blue substance", and usually indicates any of a number of colours in the blue/green range of the spectrum. Cyanobacteria are commonly referred to as blue-green algae. Traditionally they were thought of as a form of algae, and were introduced as such in older textbooks. However modern sources tend to regard this as outdated; they are now considered to be more closely related to bacteria, and the term for true algae is restricted to eukaryotic organisms. Like true algae, cyanobacteria are photosynthetic and contain photosynthetic pigments, which is why they are usually green or blue.

== Harmful algal blooms ==
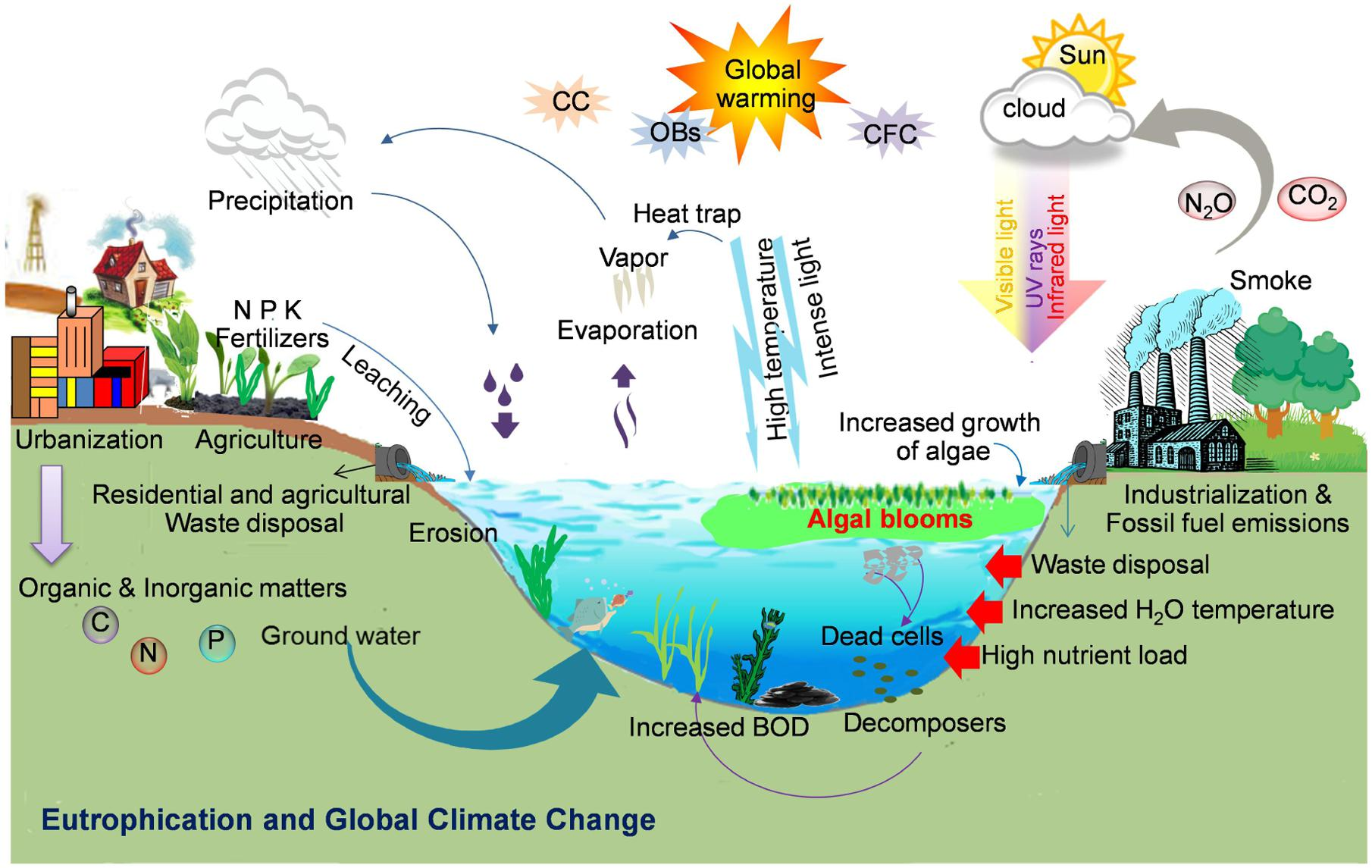
Formation of cyanobacterial blooms Key factors include anthropogenic eutrophication, global climate change such as increased temperature and light or global warming due to an increase in ozone depleting substances (e.g., CO_{2}, N_{2}O, etc.), and other biotic and abiotic factors responsible for the worldwide bloom incidence.

Cyanotoxins are often implicated in what are commonly called red tides or harmful algal blooms. Lakes and oceans contain many single-celled organisms called phytoplankton. Under certain conditions, particularly when nutrient concentrations are high, these organisms reproduce exponentially. The resulting dense swarm of phytoplankton is called an algal bloom; these can cover hundreds of square kilometres and can be easily seen in satellite images. Individual phytoplankton rarely live more than a few days, but blooms can last weeks.

While some of these blooms are harmless, others fall into the category of harmful algal blooms, or HABs. HABs can contain toxins or pathogens which result in fish kill and can also be fatal to humans. In marine environments, HABs are mostly caused by dinoflagellates, though species of other algae taxa can also cause HABs (diatoms, flagellates, haptophytes and raphidophytes). Marine dinoflagellate species are often toxic, but freshwater species are not known to be toxic. Neither are diatoms known to be toxic, at least to humans.

In freshwater ecosystems, algal blooms are most commonly caused by high levels of nutrients (eutrophication). The blooms can look like foam, scum or mats or like paint floating on the surface of the water, but they are not always visible. Nor are the blooms always green; they can be blue, and some cyanobacteria species are coloured brownish-red. The water can smell bad when the cyanobacteria in the bloom die.

Strong cyanobacterial blooms reduce visibility to one or two centimetres. Species which need to see to find food and partners are compromised. During the day blooming cyanobacteria saturate the water with oxygen. At night respiring aquatic organisms can deplete the oxygen to the point where sensitive species, such as certain fish, die. This is more likely to happen near the sea floor or a thermocline. Water acidity also cycles daily during a bloom, with the pH reaching 9 or more during the day and dropping to low values at night, further stressing the ecosystem. In addition, many cyanobacteria species produce potent cyanotoxins which concentrate during a bloom to the point where they become lethal to nearby aquatic organisms and any other animals in direct contact with the bloom, including birds, livestock, domestic animals and sometimes humans.

In 1991 a harmful cyanobacterial bloom affected 1,000 km of the Darling-Barwon River in Australia at an economic cost of $10M AUD.

== Chemical structure ==
Cyanotoxins usually target the nervous system (neurotoxins), the liver (hepatotoxins) or the skin (dermatoxins). The chemical structure of cyanotoxins falls into three broad groups: cyclic peptides, alkaloids and lipopolysaccharides (endotoxins).

Chemical structure of cyanotoxins
Structure	Cyanotoxin	Primary target organ in mammals	Cyanobacteria genera
Cyclic peptides	Microcystins	Liver	Microcystis, Anabaena, Planktothrix (Oscillatoria), Nostoc, Hapalosiphon, Anabaenopsis
Cyclic peptides	Nodularins	Liver	Nodularia
Alkaloids	Anatoxin-a	Nerve synapse	Anabaena, Planktothrix (Oscillatoria), Aphanizomenon
Alkaloids	Guanitoxin	Nerve synapse	Anabaena
Alkaloids	Cylindrospermopsins	Liver	Cylindrospermopsis, Aphanizomenon, Umezakia
Alkaloids	Lyngbyatoxin-a	Skin, gastro-intestinal tract	Lyngbya
Alkaloids	Saxitoxin	Nerve synapse	Anabaena, Aphanizomenon, Lyngbya, Cylindrospermopsis
Alkaloids	Aetokthonotoxin	white matter of the brain; toxicity to mammals not yet confirmed	Aetokthonos
Lipopolysaccharides		Potential irritant; affects any exposed tissue	All (not specific to Cyanobacteria: lipopolysaccharides are found in the second cell wall of Gram-negative bacteria in general)
Polyketides	Aplysiatoxins	Skin	Lyngbya, Schizothrix, Planktothrix (Oscillatoria)
Amino Acid	BMAA	Nervous system	All

Most cyanotoxins have a number of variants (analogues). As of 1999, altogether over 84 cyanotoxins were known and only a small number have been well studied.

== Cyclic peptides ==
A peptide is a short polymer of amino acids linked by peptide bonds. They have the same chemical structure as proteins, except they are shorter. In a cyclic peptide, the ends link to form a stable circular chain. In mammals this stability makes them resistant to the process of digestion and they can bioaccumulate in the liver. Of all the cyanotoxins, the cyclic peptides are of most concern to human health. The microcystins and nodularins poison the liver, and exposure to high doses can cause death. Exposure to low doses in drinking water over a long period of time may promote liver and other tumours.

=== Microcystins ===
Microcystin LR

As with other cyanotoxins, microcystins were named after the first organism discovered to produce them, Microcystis aeruginosa. However it was later found other cyanobacterial genera also produced them. There are about 60 known variants of microcystin, and several of these can be produced during a bloom. The most reported variant is microcystin-LR, possibly because the earliest commercially available chemical standard analysis was for microcystin-LR.

Blooms containing microcystin are a problem worldwide in freshwater ecosystems. Microcystins are cyclic peptides and can be very toxic for plants and animals including humans. They bioaccumulate in the liver of fish, in the hepatopancreas of mussels, and in zooplankton. They are hepatotoxic and can cause serious damage to the liver in humans. In this way they are similar to the nodularins (below), and together the microcystins and nodularins account for most of the toxic cyanobacterial blooms in fresh and brackish waters. In 2010, a number of sea otters were poisoned by microcystin. Marine bivalves were the likely source of hepatotoxic shellfish poisoning. This was the first confirmed example of a marine mammal dying from ingesting a cyanotoxin.

=== Nodularins ===
Nodularin-R

The first nodularin variant to be identified was nodularin-R, produced by the cyanobacterium Nodularia spumigena. This cyanobacterium blooms in water bodies throughout the world. In the Baltic Sea, marine blooms of Nodularia spumigena are among some of the largest cyanobacterial mass events in the world. (Parts of nine industrialized countries drain into the Baltic Sea, which has little water exchange with the North Sea and Atlantic Ocean. It is consequently one of the more polluted bodies of water in the world (nutrient-rich, from the perspective of cyanobacteria).)

Globally, the most common toxins present in cyanobacterial blooms in fresh and brackish waters are the cyclic peptide toxins of the nodularin family. Like the microcystin family (above), nodularins are potent hepatotoxins and can cause serious damage to the liver. They present health risks for wild and domestic animals as well as humans, and in many areas pose major challenges for the provision of safe drinking water.

== Alkaloids ==
Alkaloids are a group of naturally occurring chemical compounds which mostly contain basic nitrogen atoms. They are produced by a large variety of organisms, including cyanobacteria, and are part of the group of natural products, also called secondary metabolites. Alkaloids act on diverse metabolic systems in humans and other animals, often with psychotropic or toxic effects. Almost uniformly, they are bitter tasting.

=== Anatoxin-a ===
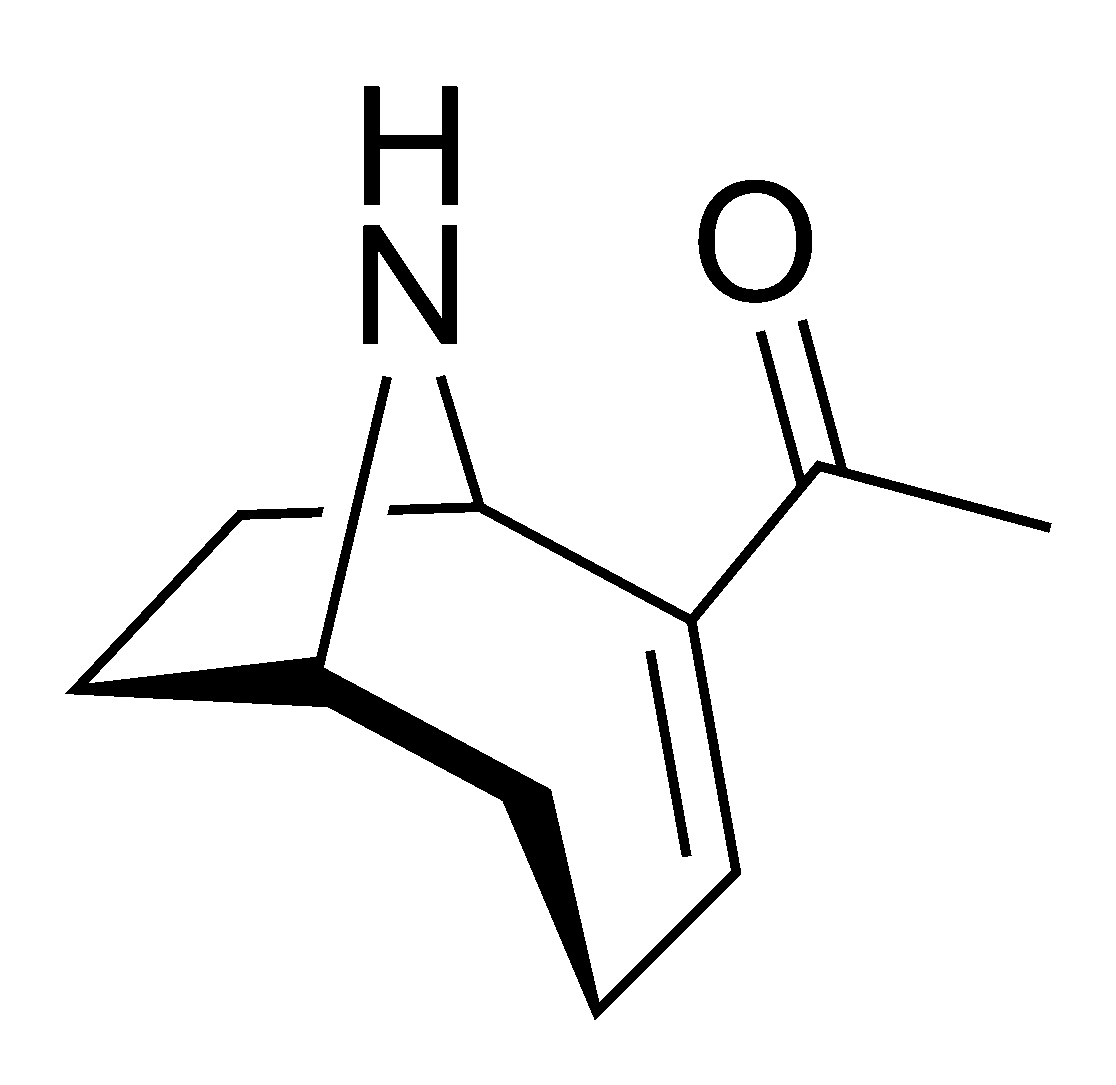
Anatoxin-a

Investigations into anatoxin-a, also known as "Very Fast Death Factor", began in 1961 following the deaths of cows that drank from a lake containing an algal bloom in Saskatchewan, Canada. The toxin is produced by at least four different genera of cyanobacteria and has been reported in North America, Europe, Africa, Asia, and New Zealand.

Toxic effects from anatoxin-a progress very rapidly because it acts directly on the nerve cells (neurons) as a neurotoxin. The progressive symptoms of anatoxin-a exposure are loss of coordination, twitching, convulsions and rapid death by respiratory paralysis. The nerve tissues which communicate with muscles contain a receptor called the nicotinic acetylcholine receptor. Stimulation of these receptors causes a muscular contraction. The anatoxin-a molecule is shaped so it fits this receptor, and in this way it mimics the natural neurotransmitter normally used by the receptor, acetylcholine. Once it has triggered a contraction, anatoxin-a does not allow the neurons to return to their resting state, because it is not degraded by cholinesterase which normally performs this function. As a result, the muscle cells contract permanently, the communication between the brain and the muscles is disrupted and breathing stops.

External videos
- Very Fast Death Factor; University of Nottingham

The toxin was called the Very Fast Death Factor because it induced tremors, paralysis and death within a few minutes when injected into the body cavity of mice. In 1977, the structure of VFDF was determined as a secondary, bicyclic amine alkaloid, and it was renamed anatoxin-a. Structurally, it is similar to cocaine. There is continued interest in anatoxin-a because of the dangers it presents to recreational and drinking waters, and because it is a particularly useful molecule for investigating acetylcholine receptors in the nervous system. The deadliness of the toxin means that it has a high military potential as a toxin weapon.

=== Cylindrospermopsins ===
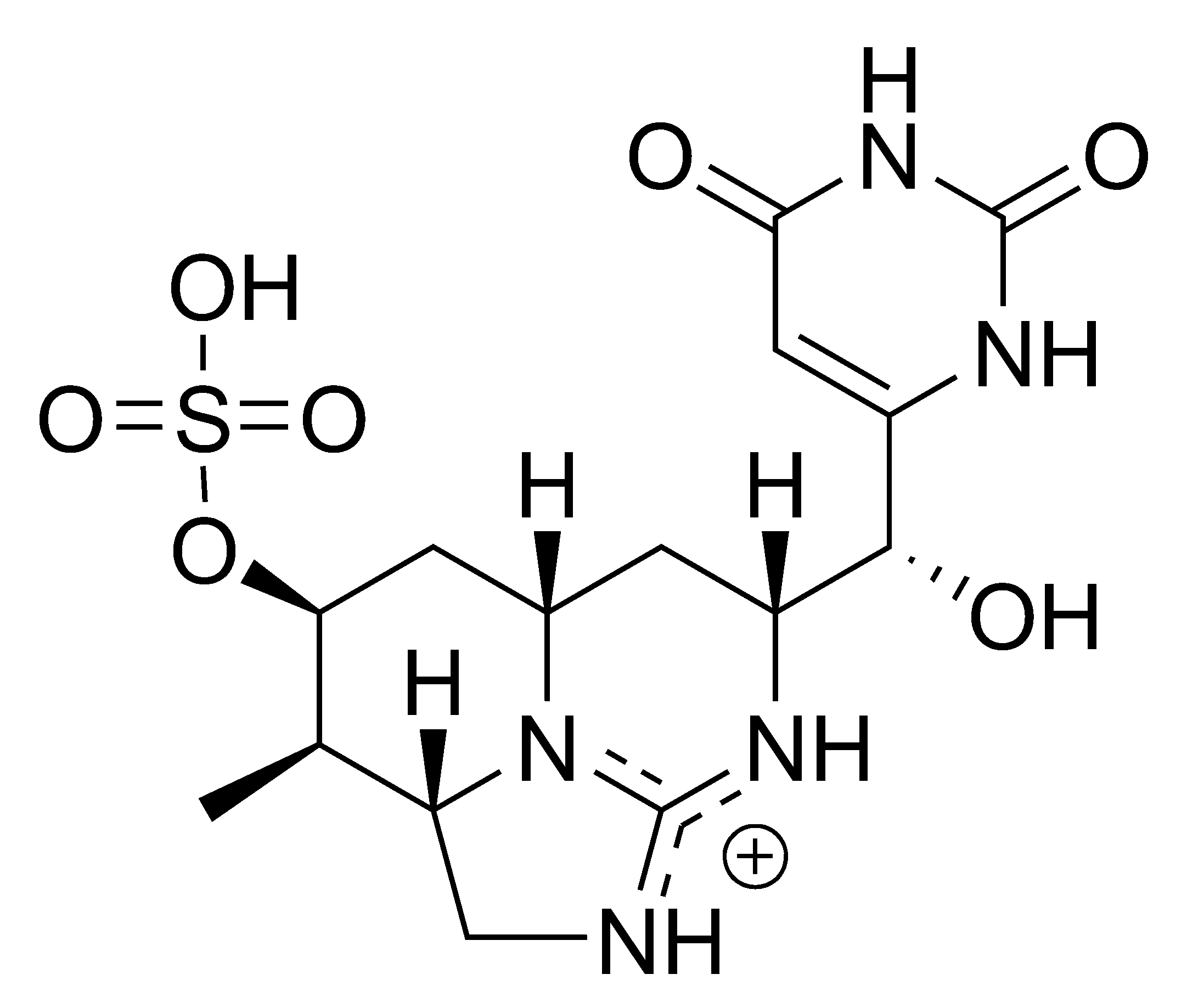
Cylindrospermopsin

Cylindrospermopsin (abbreviated to CYN or CYL) was first discovered after an outbreak of a mystery disease on Palm Island in Australia. The outbreak was traced back to a bloom of Cylindrospermopsis raciborskii in the local drinking water supply, and the toxin was subsequently identified. Analysis of the toxin led to a proposed chemical structure in 1992, which was revised after synthesis was achieved in 2000. Several variants of cylindrospermopsin, both toxic and non-toxic, have been isolated or synthesised.

Cylindrospermopsin is toxic to liver and kidney tissue and is thought to inhibit protein synthesis and to covalently modify DNA and/or RNA. There is concern about the way cylindrospermopsin bioaccumulates in freshwater organisms. Toxic blooms of genera which produce cylindrospermopsin are most commonly found in tropical, subtropical and arid zone water bodies, and have recently been found in Australia, Europe, Israel, Japan and the USA.

=== Saxitoxins ===
Saxitoxin

Saxitoxin (STX) is one of the most potent natural neurotoxins known. The term saxitoxin originates from the species name of the butter clam (Saxidomus giganteus) whereby it was first recognized. Saxitoxin is produced by the cyanobacteria Anabaena spp., some Aphanizomenon spp., Cylindrospermopsis sp., Lyngbya sp. and Planktothrix sp., among others). Puffer fish and some marine dinoflagellates also produce saxitoxin. Saxitoxins bioaccumulate in shellfish and certain finfish. Ingestion of saxitoxin, usually through shellfish contaminated by toxic algal blooms, can result in paralytic shellfish poisoning.

Saxitoxin has been used in molecular biology to establish the function of the sodium channel. It acts on the voltage-gated sodium channels of nerve cells, preventing normal cellular function and leading to paralysis. The blocking of neuronal sodium channels which occurs in paralytic shellfish poisoning produces a flaccid paralysis that leaves its victim calm and conscious through the progression of symptoms. Death often occurs from respiratory failure. Saxitoxin was originally isolated and described by the United States military, who assigned it the chemical weapon designation "TZ". Saxitoxin is listed in schedule 1 of the Chemical Weapons Convention. According to the book Spycraft, U-2 spyplane pilots were provided with needles containing saxitoxin to be used for suicide in the event escape was impossible.

=== Aetokthonotoxin ===
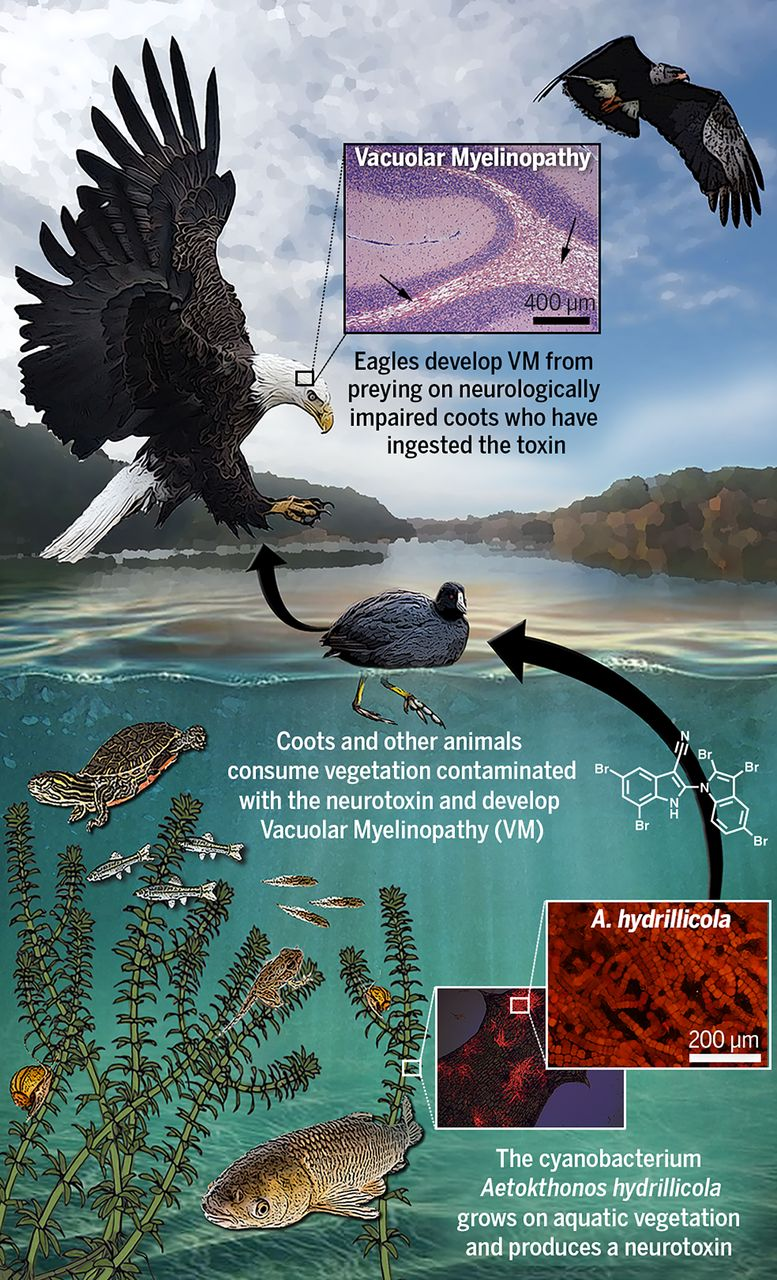
Transmission from cyanobacteria to the bald eagle

Aetokthonotoxin (abbreviated to AETX) was discovered in 2021 as the cyanobacterial neurotoxin causing vacuolar myelinopathy (VM). As the biosynthesis of aetokthonotoxin depends on the availability of bromide in freshwater systems and requires an interplay between the toxin-producing cyanobacterium Aetokthonos hydrillicola and the host plant it epiphytically grows on (most importantly hydrilla), it took > 25 years to discover aetokthonotoxin as the VM-inducing toxin after the disease has first been diagnosed in bald eagles in 1994. The toxin cascades through the food-chain: Among other animals, it affects fish and waterfowl such as coots or ducks which feed on hydrilla colonized with the cyanobacterium. Aetokthonotoxin is transmitted to raptors, such as the bald eagle, that prey on these affected animals.

Vacuolar myelinopathy is characterized by widespread vacuolization of the myelinated axons (intramyelinic edema) in the white matter of the brain and spinal cord. Clinical signs of the intoxication include the severe loss of motor functions and sight. Affected birds fly into objects, lack coordination in swimming, flying and walking, develop tremors of the head and lose their responsiveness. As the toxin has been shown to bioaccumulate, there is concern that it might also be a threat to human health. However, toxicity to mammals has yet to be confirmed experimentally.

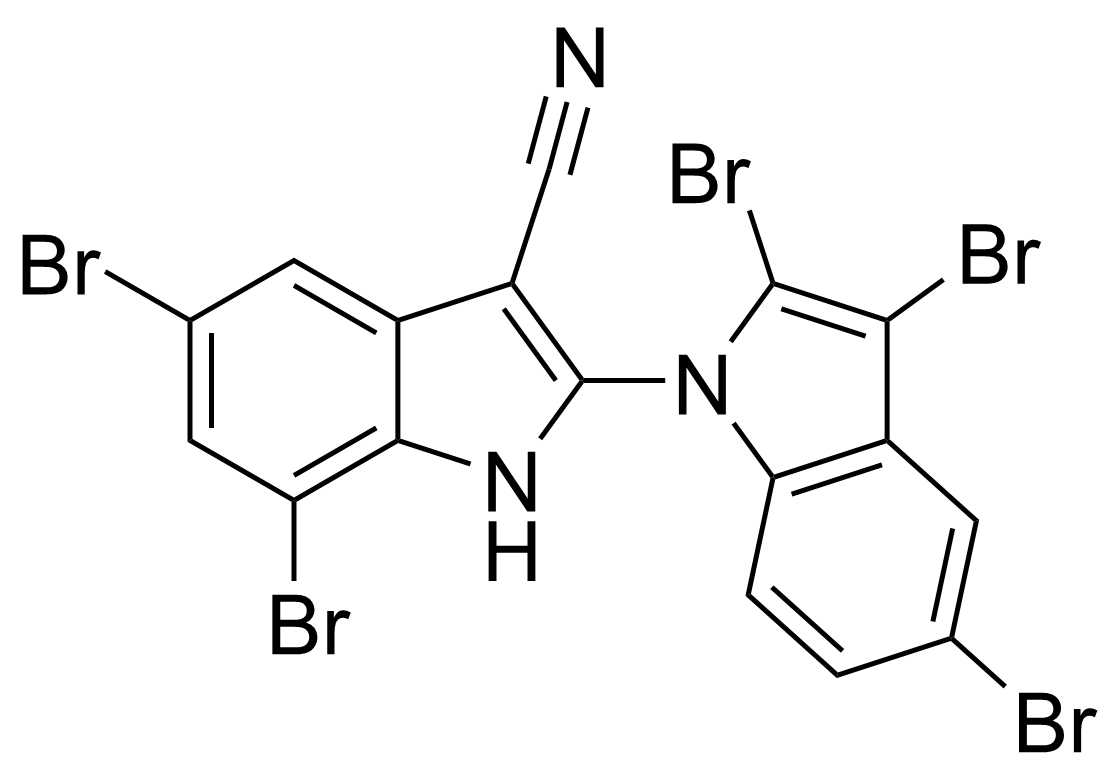
Aetokthonotoxin

== Lipopolysaccharides ==
Lipopolysaccharides are present in all cyanobacteria (and more generally in Gram-negative bacteria). Though not as potent as other cyanotoxins, some researchers have claimed that all lipopolysaccharides in cyanobacteria can irritate the skin, while other researchers doubt the toxic effects are that generalized.

== Amino acids ==
=== BMAA ===
The non-proteinogenic amino acid beta-Methylamino-L-alanine (BMAA) is ubiquitously produced by cyanobacteria in marine, freshwater, brackish, and terrestrial environments. The exact mechanisms of BMAA toxicity on neuron cells is being investigated. Research suggests both acute and chronic mechanisms of toxicity. BMAA is being investigated as a potential environmental risk factor for neurodegenerative diseases, including ALS, Parkinson's disease and Alzheimer's disease.

== Gallery ==
Other cyanotoxins:

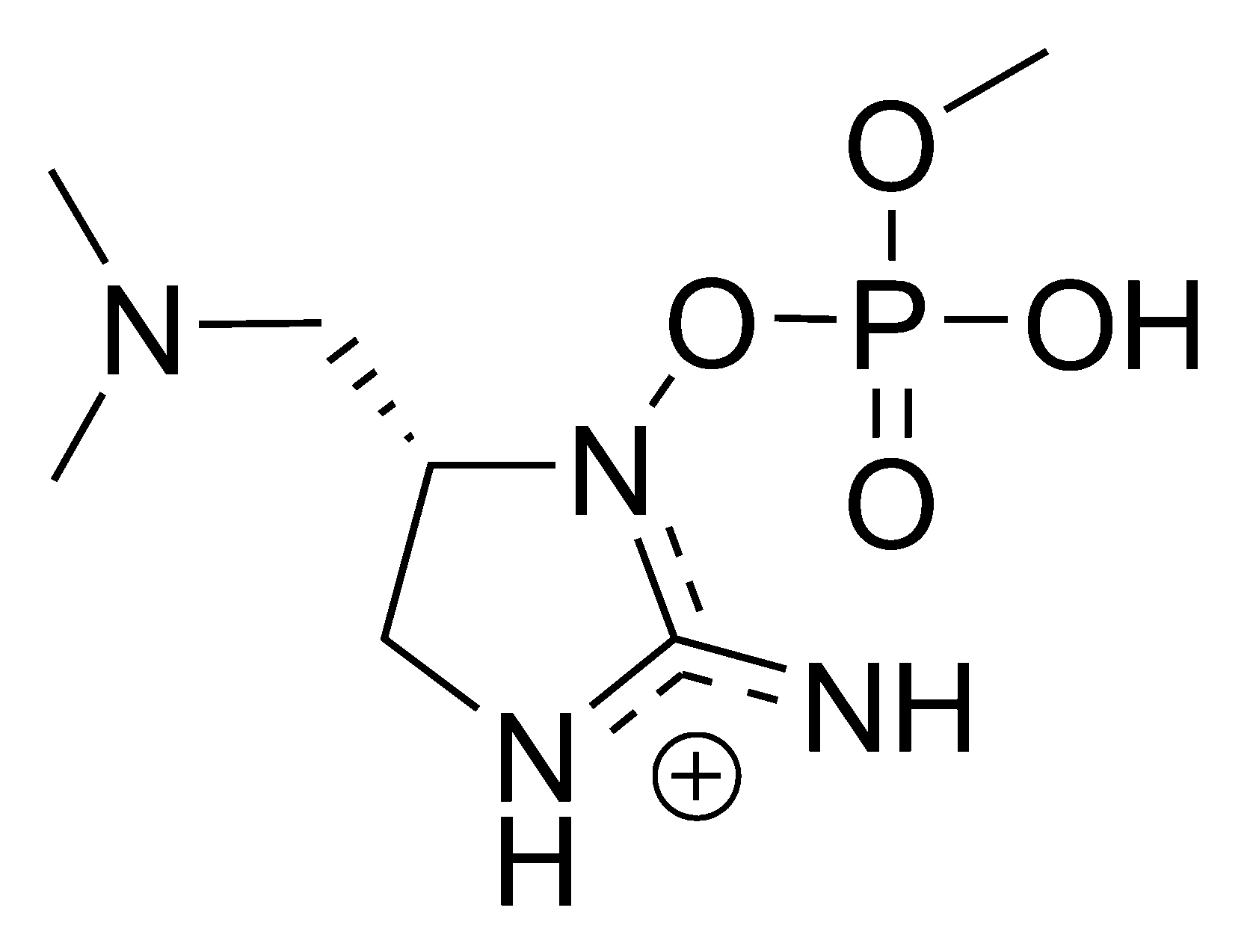
Guanitoxin

Aplysiatoxin

== See also ==
- Dinotoxin
- Microbial mats
- Microbial toxins
- Microviridin
- Organisms involved in water purification
- 1991 Darling River cyanobacterial bloom
