= Jadwiga Wołoszyńska =

Polish botanist

Jadwiga Wołoszyńska (5 April 1882 in Nadwórna – 30 August 1951 in Kraków) was a Polish botanist known for studying algology, limnology, and paleobotany. She identified new types and species (e.g. Prorocentrum cassubicum (Woloszynska) Dodge (1975) of algae and studied lakes in Poland, Lithuania, Ukraine, Java, Sumatra and Africa The standard author abbreviation Wołosz. is used to indicate this person as the author when citing a botanical name.
