= Cylindrospermopsin =

Names
- IUPAC name 2,4(1H,3H)-Pyrimidinedione, 6-[(R)-hydroxy[(2aS,3R,4S,5aS,7R) -2,2a,3,4,5,5a,6,7-octahydro-3-methyl-4-(sulfooxy) -1H-1,8,8b-triazaacenaphthylen-7-yl]methyl]-
- Other names Cylindrospermopsine

Identifiers
CAS Number	143545-90-8; 265652-18-4 7-epi
3D model (JSmol)	Interactive image
ChEBI	CHEBI:26502525; CHEBI:88049 7-epi
ChEMBL	ChEMBL1722002
ChemSpider	21106433
ECHA InfoCard	100.229.780
KEGG	C19999
PubChem CID	42628600; 115005 7-epi
UNII	2JIZ556BA3
CompTox Dashboard (EPA)	DTXSID2031083
- InChI: InChI=1S/C15H21N5O7S/c1-6-10-5-16-14-17-8(13(22)9-4-12(21)19-15(23)18-9)2-7(20(10)14)3-11(6)27-28(24,25)26/h4,6-8,10-11,13,22H,2-3,5H2,1H3,(H,16,17)(H,24,25,26)(H2,18,19,21,23)/p+1/t6-,7+,8-,10?,11+,13+/m1/s1 Key: LHJPHMKIGRLKDR-NPSYHWQSSA-O; InChI=1/C15H21N5O7S/c1-6-10-5-16-14-17-8(13(22)9-4-12(21)19-15(23)18-9)2-7(20(10)14)3-11(6)27-28(24,25)26/h4,6-8,10-11,13,22H,2-3,5H2,1H3,(H,16,17)(H,24,25,26)(H2,18,19,21,23)/p+1/t6-,7+,8-,10?,11+,13+/m1/s1 Key: LHJPHMKIGRLKDR-FGVRTCLEBA
- SMILES: O=C1/C=C(\N=C(\O)N1)[C@@H](O)[C@H]2C[C@H]4C[C@H](OS(O)(=O)=O)[C@H](C)C3C\[NH+]=C(\N2)N34

Properties
Chemical formula	C_{15}H_{21}N_{5}O_{7}S
Molar mass	415.43
Appearance	White solid
Solubility in water	High

Hazards
- GHS labelling
Pictograms	(GHS06: Toxic) (GHS08: Health hazard)
Signal word	Danger
Hazard statements	H300, H341, H370
Precautionary statements	P201, P202, P260, P264, P270, P281, P301+P310, P307+P311, P308+P313, P321, P330, P405, P501
- Except where otherwise noted, data are given for materials in their standard state (at 25 °C [77 °F], 100 kPa). verify (what is ?) Infobox references

Cylindrospermopsin (abbreviated to CYN, or CYL) is a cyanotoxin produced by a variety of freshwater cyanobacteria. CYN is a polycyclic uracil derivative containing guanidino and sulfate groups. It is also zwitterionic, making it highly water soluble. CYN is toxic to liver and kidney tissue and is thought to inhibit protein synthesis and to covalently modify DNA and/or RNA. It is not known whether cylindrospermopsin is a carcinogen, but it appears to have no tumour-initiating activity in mice.

CYN was first discovered after an outbreak of a mystery disease on Palm Island, Queensland, Australia. The outbreak was traced to a bloom of Cylindrospermopsis raciborskii in the local drinking water supply, and the toxin was subsequently identified. Analysis of the toxin led to a proposed chemical structure in 1992, which was revised after synthesis was achieved in 2000. Several analogues of CYN, both toxic and non-toxic, have been isolated or synthesised.

C. raciborskii has been observed mainly in tropical areas, but has also been observed in temperate regions of Australia, North, South America, New Zealand and Europe. The CYN-producing strain of C. raciborskii has not been identified in Europe, but several other European cyanobacteria species are CYN-producing.

== Discovery ==
In 1979, 138 inhabitants of Palm Island, Queensland, Australia, were admitted to hospital, suffering various symptoms of gastroenteritis. All of these were children; in addition, 10 adults were affected but not hospitalised. Initial symptoms, including abdominal pain and vomiting, resembled those of hepatitis; later symptoms included kidney failure and bloody diarrhoea. Urine analysis revealed high levels of proteins, ketones and sugar in many patients, along with blood and urobilinogen in lesser numbers. The urine analysis, along with faecal microscopy and poison screening, could not provide a statistical link to the symptoms. All patients recovered within 4 to 26 days, and at the time there was no apparent cause for the outbreak. Initial thoughts on the cause included poor water quality and diet; the illness was coined the "Palm Island Mystery Disease".

At the time, it was noticed that this outbreak coincided with a severe algal bloom in the local drinking water supply, and soon after the focus turned to the dam in question. An epidemiological study of this "mystery disease" later confirmed that the Solomon Dam was implicated, as those who became ill had used water from the dam. It became apparent that a recent treatment of the algal bloom with copper sulfate caused lysis of the algal cells, releasing a toxin into the water. A study of the dam revealed that periodic blooms of algae were caused predominantly by three strains of cyanobacteria: two of the genus Anabaena, and Cylindrospermopsis raciborskii, previously unknown in Australian waters. A mouse bioassay of the three demonstrated that although the two Anabaena strains were non-toxic, C. raciborskii was highly toxic. Later isolation of the compound responsible led to the identification of the toxin cylindrospermopsin.

A later report alternatively proposed that the excess copper in the water was the cause of the disease. The excessive dosing was following the use of least-cost contractors to control the algae, who were unqualified in the field.

== Chemistry ==
=== Structure determination ===
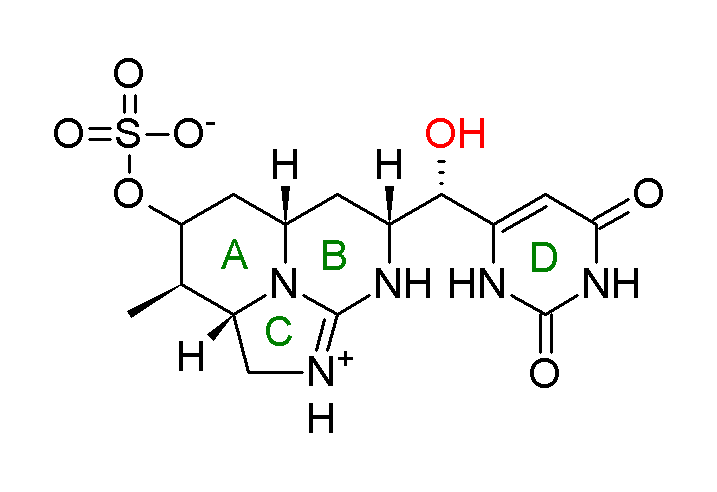
Figure 1. Initial incorrect proposed structure of cylindrospermopsin (CYN), with its four rings labelled (A-D). The incorrect feature was the orientation of the hydroxyl group. This epimer was later identified as 7-epicyclindrospermopsin.

Isolation of the toxin using cyanobacteria cultured from the original Palm Island strain was achieved by gel filtration of an aqueous extract, followed by reverse-phase HPLC. Structure elucidation was achieved via mass spectrometry (MS) and nuclear magnetic resonance (NMR) experiments, and a structure (later proven slightly incorrect) was proposed (Figure 1).

This almost-correct molecule possesses a tricyclic guanidine group (rings A, B & C), along with a uracil ring (D). The zwitterionic nature of the molecule makes this highly water-soluble, as the presence of charged areas within the molecule creates a dipole effect, suiting the polar solvent. Sensitivity of key signals in the NMR spectrum to small changes in pH suggested that the uracil ring exists in a keto/enol tautomeric relationship, where a hydrogen transfer results in two distinct structures (Figure 2). It was originally proposed that a hydrogen bond between the uracil and guanidine groups in the enol tautomer would make this the dominant form.

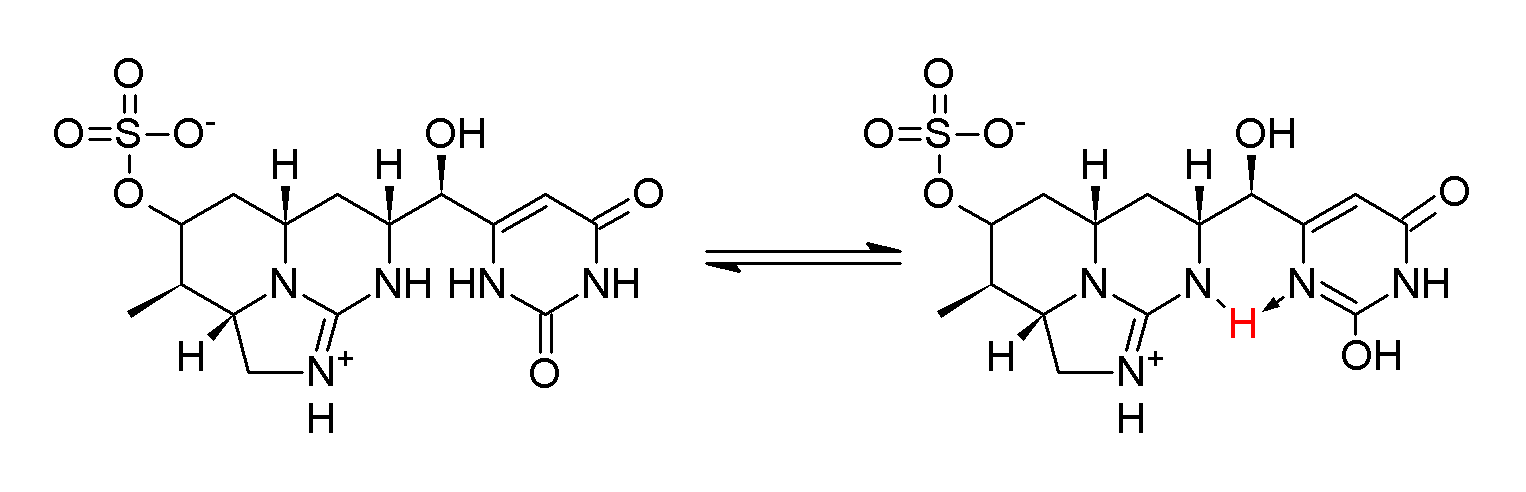
Figure 2. Proposed tautomerism between the keto and enol forms, showing the hydrogen bond between the uracil nitrogen and the guanidino hydrogen.

=== Analogues ===
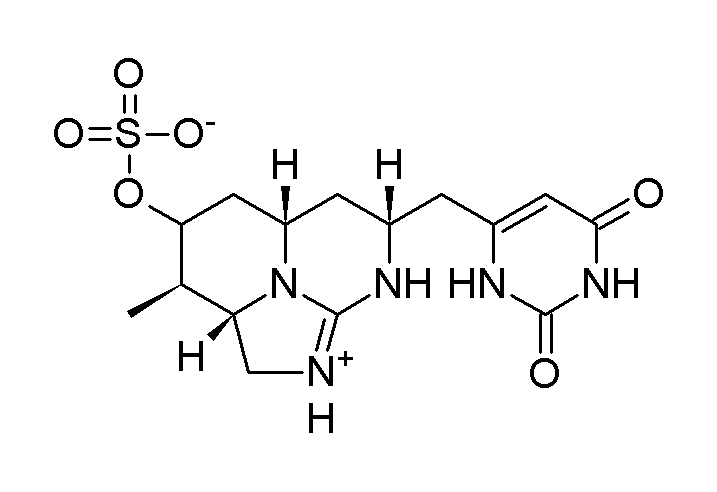
Figure 3. Deoxycylindrospermopsin, a non-toxic metabolite of C. raciborskii

A second metabolite of C. raciborskii was identified from extracts of the cyanobacteria after the observation of a frequently occurring peak accompanying that of CYN during UV and MS experiments. Analysis by MS and NMR methods concluded that this new compound was missing the oxygen adjacent to the uracil ring, and was named deoxycylindrospermopsin (Figure 3).

In 1999, an epimer of CYN, named 7-epicyclindrospermopsin (epiCYN), was also identified as a minor metabolite from Aphanizomenon ovalisporum. This occurred whilst isolating CYN from cyanobacteria taken from Lake Kinneret in Israel. The proposed structure of this molecule differed from CYN only in the orientation of the hydroxyl group adjacent to the uracil ring (Figure 4).

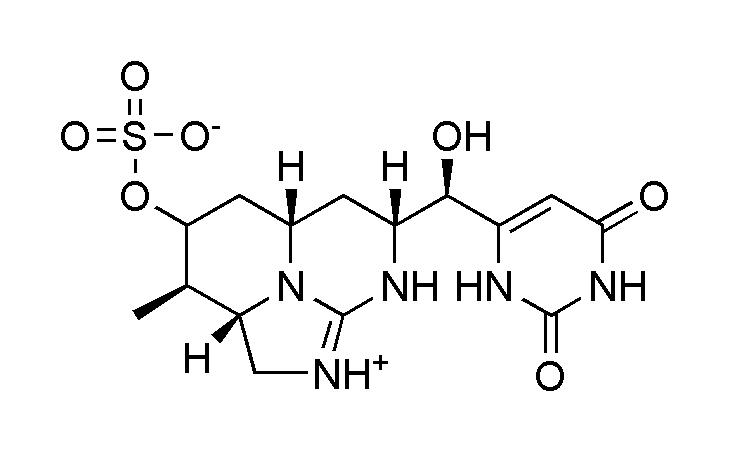
Figure 4. Initial proposed structure of 7-epicyclindrospermopsin (epiCYN), which was later shown to be the structure of CYN

=== Total synthesis ===
Synthetic approaches to CYN started with the piperidine ring (A), and progressed to annulation of rings B and C. The first total synthesis of CYN was reported in 2000 through a 20-step process.

Improvements to synthetic methods led to a revision of the stereochemistry of CYN in 2001. A synthetic process controlling each of the six stereogenic centres of epiCYN established that the original assignments of both CYN and epiCYN were in fact a reversal of the correct structures. An alternative approach by White and Hansen supported these absolute configurations (Figure 5). At the time of this correct assignment, it was suggested that the enol form was not dominant.

=== Stability ===
One of the key factors associated with the toxicity of CYN is its stability. Although the toxin has been found to degrade rapidly in an algal extract when exposed to sunlight, it is resistant to degradation by changes in pH and temperature, and shows no degradation in either the pure solid form or in pure water. As a result, in turbid and unmoving water the toxin can persist for long periods, and although boiling water will kill the cyanobacteria, it may not remove the toxin.

== Toxicology ==
=== Toxic effects ===
Hawkins et al.. demonstrated the toxic effects of CYN by mouse bioassay, using an extract of the original Palm Island strain. Acutely poisoned mice displayed anorexia, diarrhoea and gasping respiration. Autopsy results revealed haemorrhages in the lungs, livers, kidneys, small intestines and adrenal glands. Histopathology revealed dose-related necrosis of hepatocytes, lipid accumulation, and fibrin thrombi formation in blood vessels of the liver and lungs, along with varying epithelial cell necrosis in areas of the kidneys.

A more recent mouse bioassay of the effects of cylindrospermopsin revealed an increase in liver weight, with both lethal and non-lethal doses; in addition the livers appeared dark-coloured. Extensive necrosis of hepatocytes was visible in mice administered a lethal dose, and some localised damage was also observed in mice administered a non-lethal dose.

=== Toxicity ===
An initial estimate of the toxicity of CYN in 1985 was that an LD_{50} at 24 hours was 64±5 mg of freeze-dried culture/kg of mouse body weight on intraperitoneal injection. A further experiment in 1997 measured the LD_{50} as 52 mg/kg at 24 hours and 32 mg/kg at 7 days, however the data suggested that another toxic compound was present in the isolate of sonicated cells used; predictions made by Ohtani et al. about the 24‑hour toxicity were considerably higher, and it was proposed that another metabolite was present to account for the relatively low 24‑hour toxicity level measured.

Because the most likely human route of uptake of CYN is ingestion, oral toxicity experiments were conducted on mice. The oral LD_{50} was found to be 4.4-6.9 mg CYN/kg, and in addition to some ulceration of the oesophageal gastric mucosa, symptoms were consistent with that of intraperitoneal dosing. Stomach contents included culture material, which indicated that these LD_{50} figures might be overestimated.

Another means of exposure to CYN is related to alterations in the gut microbiome by artificial sweetners. A study including Aspartame conducted at Cedars-Sinai in Los Angeles by Ruchi Mathur, MD detected CYN in the duodenum at levels four times above baseline in Aspartame users, along with alterations in bacterial species.

=== Mechanism of action ===
Pathological changes associated with CYN poisoning were reported to be in four distinct stages: inhibition of protein synthesis, proliferation of membranes, lipid accumulation within cells, and finally cell death. Examination of mice livers removed at autopsy showed that on intraperitoneal injection of CYN, after 16 hours ribosomes from the rough endoplasmic reticulum (rER) had detached, and at 24 hours, marked proliferation of the membrane systems of the smooth ER and Golgi apparatus had occurred. At 48 hours, small lipid droplets had accumulated in the cell bodies, and at 100 hours, hepatocytes in the hepatic lobules were destroyed beyond function.

The process of protein synthesis inhibition has been shown to be irreversible, however is not conclusively the method of cytotoxicity of the compound. Froscio et al.. proposed that CYN has at least two separate modes of action: the previously reported protein synthesis inhibition, and an as-yet unclear method of causing cell death. It has been shown that cells can survive for long periods (up to 20 hours) with 90% inhibition of protein synthesis, and still maintain viability. Since CYN is cytotoxic within 16–18 hours it has been suggested that other mechanisms are the cause of cell death.

Cytochrome P450 has been implicated in the toxicity of CYN, as blocking the action of P450 reduces the toxicity of CYN. It has been proposed that an activated P450-derived metabolite (or metabolites) of CYN is the main cause of toxicity. Shaw et al.. demonstrated that the toxin could be metabolised in vivo, resulting in bound metabolites in the liver tissue, and that damage was more prevalent in rat hepatocytes than other cell types.

Due to the structure of CYN, which includes sulfate, guanidine and uracil groups, it has been suggested that CYN acts on DNA or RNA. Shaw et al.. reported covalent binding of CYN or its metabolites to DNA in mice, and DNA strand breakage has also been observed. Humpage et al. also supported this, and in addition postulated that CYN (or a metabolite) acts on either the spindle or centromeres during cell division, inducing loss of whole chromosomes.

The uracil group of CYN has been identified as a pharmacophore of the toxin. In two experiments, the vinylic hydrogen atom on the uracil ring was replaced with a chlorine atom to form 5-chlorocylindrospermopsin, and the uracil group was truncated to a carboxylic acid, to form cylindrospermic acid (Figure 6). Both products were assessed as being non-toxic, even at 50 times the LD_{50} of CYN. In the previous determination of the structure of deoxycylindrospermopsin, a toxicity assessment of the compound was carried out. Mice injected intraperitoneally with four times the 5-day median lethal dose of CYN showed no toxic effects. As this compound was shown to be relatively abundant, it was concluded that this analogue was comparatively non-toxic. Given that both CYN and epiCYN are toxic, the hydroxyl group on the uracil bridge can be considered necessary for toxicity. As yet, the relative toxicities of CYN and epiCYN have not been compared.

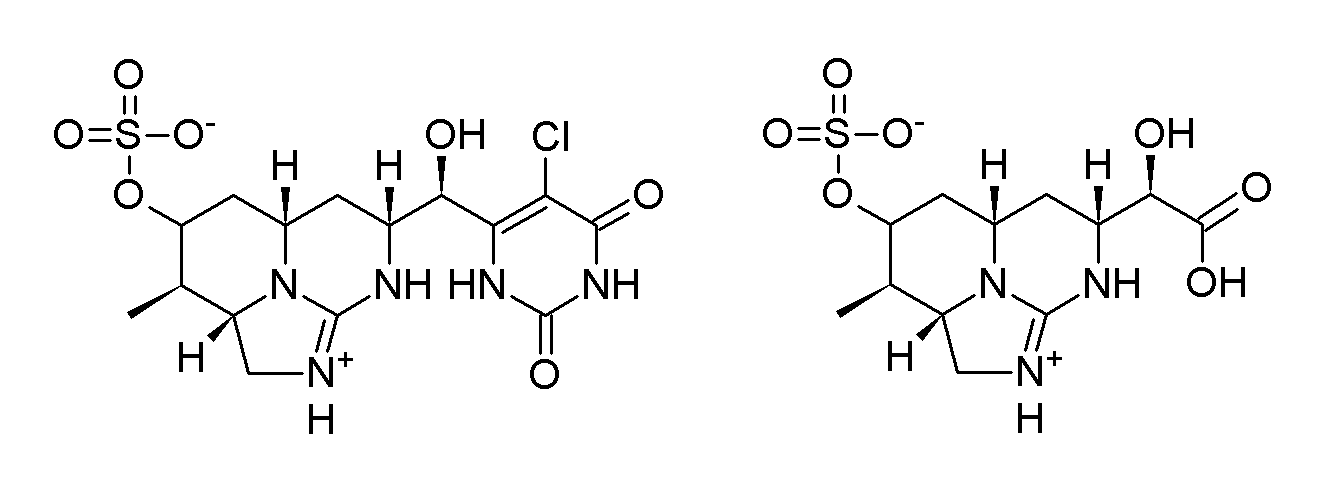
Figure 6. 5-Chlorocylindrospermopsin (left) and cylindrospermic acid, two non-toxic variants of CYN synthesised to demonstrate the importance of the intact uracil group as a pharmacophore.

== Biosynthesis ==
The cylindrospermopsin biosynthetic gene cluster (BGC) was described from Cylindrospermopsis raciborskii AWT205 in 2008.

== Related toxic blooms and their impact ==
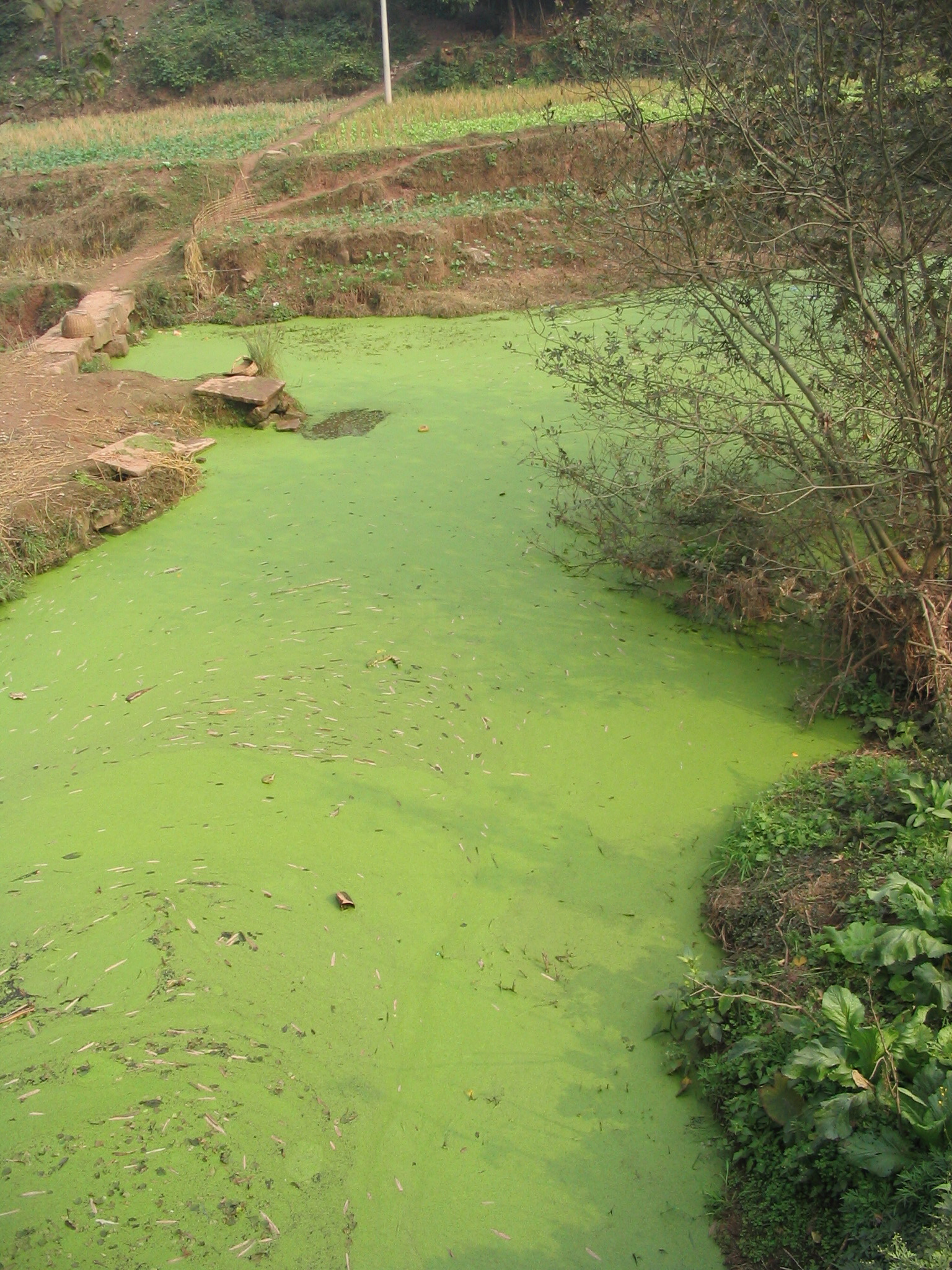
An algal bloom in a river near Chengdu, Sichuan, China.

Since the Palm Island outbreak, several other species of cyanobacteria have been identified as producing CYN: Anabaena bergii, Anabaena lapponica , Aphanizomenon ovalisporum, Umezakia natans, Raphidiopsis curvata. and Aphanizomenon issatschenkoi. In Australia, three main toxic cyanobacteria exist: Anabaena circinalis, Microcystis species and C. raciborskii. Of these the latter, which produces CYN, has attracted considerable attention, not only due to the Palm Island outbreak, but also as the species is spreading to more temperate areas. Previously, the algae was classed as only tropical, however it has recently been discovered in temperate regions of Australia, Europe, North and South America, and also New Zealand.

In August 1997, three cows and ten calves died from cylindrospermopsin poisoning on a farm in northwest Queensland. A nearby dam containing an algal bloom was tested, and C. raciborskii was identified. Analysis by HPLC/mass spectrometry revealed the presence of CYN in a sample of the biomass. An autopsy of one of the calves reported a swollen liver and gall bladder, along with haemorrhages of the heart and small intestine. Histological examination of the hepatic tissue was consistent with that reported in CYN-affected mice. This was the first report of C. raciborskii causing mortality in animals in Australia.

The effect of a bloom of C. raciborskii on an aquaculture pond in Townsville, Australia was assessed in 1997. The pond contained Redclaw crayfish, along with a population of Lake Eacham Rainbowfish to control the excess food. Analysis revealed that the water contained both extracellular and intracellular CYN, and that the crayfish had accumulated this primarily in the liver but also in the muscle tissue. Examination of the gut contents revealed cyanobacterial cells, indicating that the crayfish had ingested intracellular toxin. An experiment using an extract of the bloom showed that it was also possible to uptake extracellular toxin directly into the tissues. Such bioaccumulation, particularly in the aquaculture industry, was of concern, especially when humans were the end users of the product.

The impact of cyanobacterial blooms has been assessed in economic terms. In December 1991, the world's largest algal bloom occurred in Australia, where 1000 km of the Darling-Barwon River was affected. One million people-days of drinking water were lost, and the direct costs incurred totalled more than A$1.3 million. Moreover, 2000 site-days of recreation were also lost, and the economic cost was estimated at A$10 million, after taking into account indirectly affected industries such as tourism, accommodation and transport.

=== Current methods of analysis in water samples ===
Current methods include liquid chromatography coupled to mass spectrometry (LC-MS), mouse bioassay, protein synthesis inhibition assay, and reverse-phase HPLC-PDA (Photo Diode Array) analysis. A cell free protein synthesis assay has been developed which appears to be comparable to HPLC-MS.

== See also ==
- Cyanotoxin
- Lyngbyatoxin
- Microcystin
- Nodularin
- Saxitoxin
- Guanitoxin
