= Wawrzyniec Cyl =

Polish footballer (1900–1974)

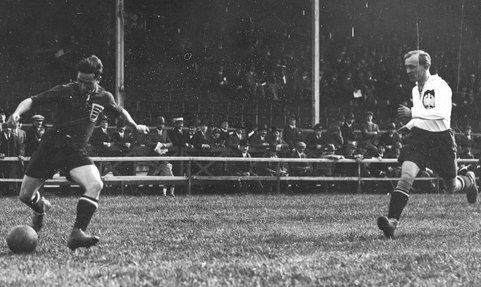
- Cyl (right) and Hungarian Hirzer at 1924 Olympics.

Personal information
- Date of birth: 2 July 1900
- Place of birth: Łódź, Poland
- Date of death: 7 February 1974 (aged 73)
- Place of death: Łódź, Poland
- Height: 1.72 m (5 ft 8 in)
- Positions: Forward; defender

Senior career*
Years	Team	Apps	(Gls)
1918–1930	ŁKS Łódź		

International career
1923–1925	Poland	4	(0)
- * Club domestic league appearances and goals

Wawrzyniec Cyl (2 July 1900 – 7 February 1974) was a Polish footballer who played as a striker or defender. He spent the entirety of his career playing for ŁKS Łódź.

He made four appearances for the Poland national team from 1923 to 1925, and represented Poland at the 1924 Summer Olympics.
