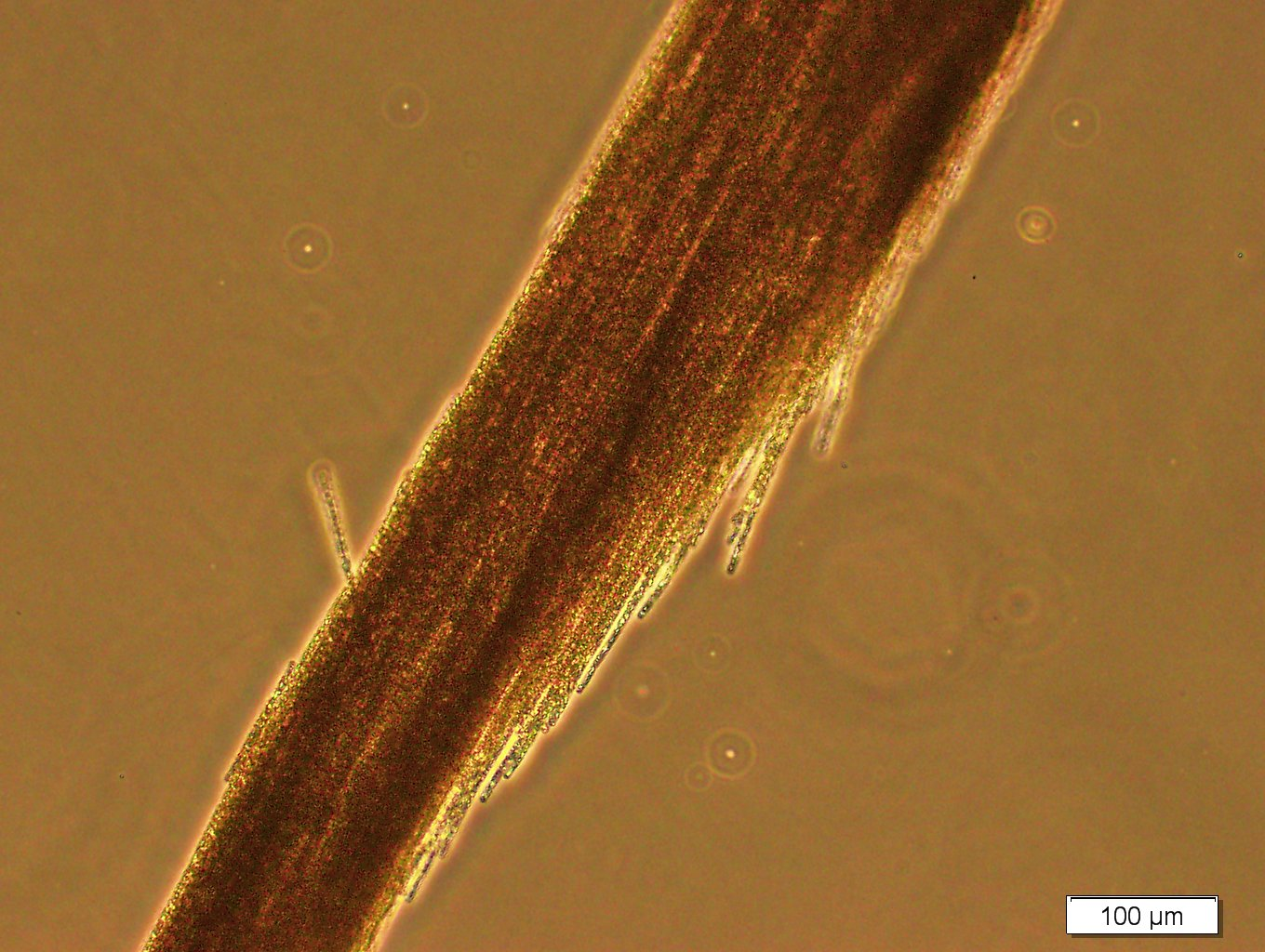

Scientific classification
- Domain: Bacteria
- Kingdom: Bacillati
- Phylum: Cyanobacteriota
- Class: Cyanophyceae
- Order: Nostocales
- Family: Aphanizomenonaceae
- Genus: Aphanizomenon
- Species: A. flos-aquae

Binomial name
- Aphanizomenon flos-aquae (L.) Ralfs ex Bornet & Flahault, 1888

Synonyms
- "Byssus flos-aquae" Linnaeus 1753; "Limnochlide flos-aquae" (L.) Kützing 1843

= Aphanizomenon flos-aquae =

Species of bacterium

Aphanizomenon flos-aquae is a colonial species of cyanobacteria with both toxic and non-toxic strains found in brackish and freshwater environments globally, including the Baltic Sea and the Great Lakes.

== Taxonomy and diversity ==
There are two cyanobacterial species in Aphanizomenonaceae having the specific epithet flos-aquae, both appearing in Bornet & Flahault 1886's work on what was then Nostocaceae. The two were morphologically different, being assigned to Aphanizomenon and Anabaena respectively. In 2005, Rajaniemi et al. (2005) reported that:

- Three samples of Ap. flos-aquae had cylindrical akinetes and hyaline terminal cells, while the shape varies in five samples of An. flos-aquae.
- Four samples of Ap. flos-aquae end up in one phylogenetic cluster (group B) and 2 in another (group D, near Ap. gracile); An. flos-aquae was dispersed among An. lemmermannii and An. solitaria.
- Aphanizomenon and Anabaena species form one group in the phylogenetic tree and are mixed with each other.

In 2009, Wacklin et al. decided to elevate the section Dolichospermum to a full genus, containing all Anabaena in groups A through G (or believed to be so based on morphology). As a result, An. flos-aquae became Dolichospermum flos-aquae. Although Ap. flos-aquae was included in the clade, it was not moved.

AlgaeBase and LPSN accept both D. flos-aquae and Ap. flos-aquae. This is because they refer to different groupings, as described before.

Type locality (Ap. flos-aquae): Type locality: Europe; USA; (INA 1996).

=== Genomes ===
As of 2024, 18 strains of Ap. flos-aquae have their whole genome sequenced and available via NCBI.

As of 2025 (Release 10-RS226), GTDB's genome-based taxonomy assigns most (15) genomes sequenced as Ap. flos-aquae to Dolichospermum flosaquae. The exceptions are Ap. flos-aquae KM1D3_PB, NIES-81, FACHB-1040; assigned to Dolichospermum heterosporum. This appears to be the result of GTDB assigning Ap. flos-aquae to D. flos-aquae (due to Ap. flos-aquae falling into Dolichospermum), in conflict with Wacklin's new combination. Theo Dreher of Oregon State University commented that this is a well-known problem in the ADA clade awaiting taxonomic resolution.

Many of sequenced the morphospecies in Anabaena, Dolichospermum, and Aphanizomenon (ADA clade) are not monophyletic. Work is underway to sequence more genomes from these genera to produce a species classification based on genetic branching. Aphanizomenon flos-aquae specifically mostly falls into one clade-species, with a minority of sequences falling into another.

== Morphology ==
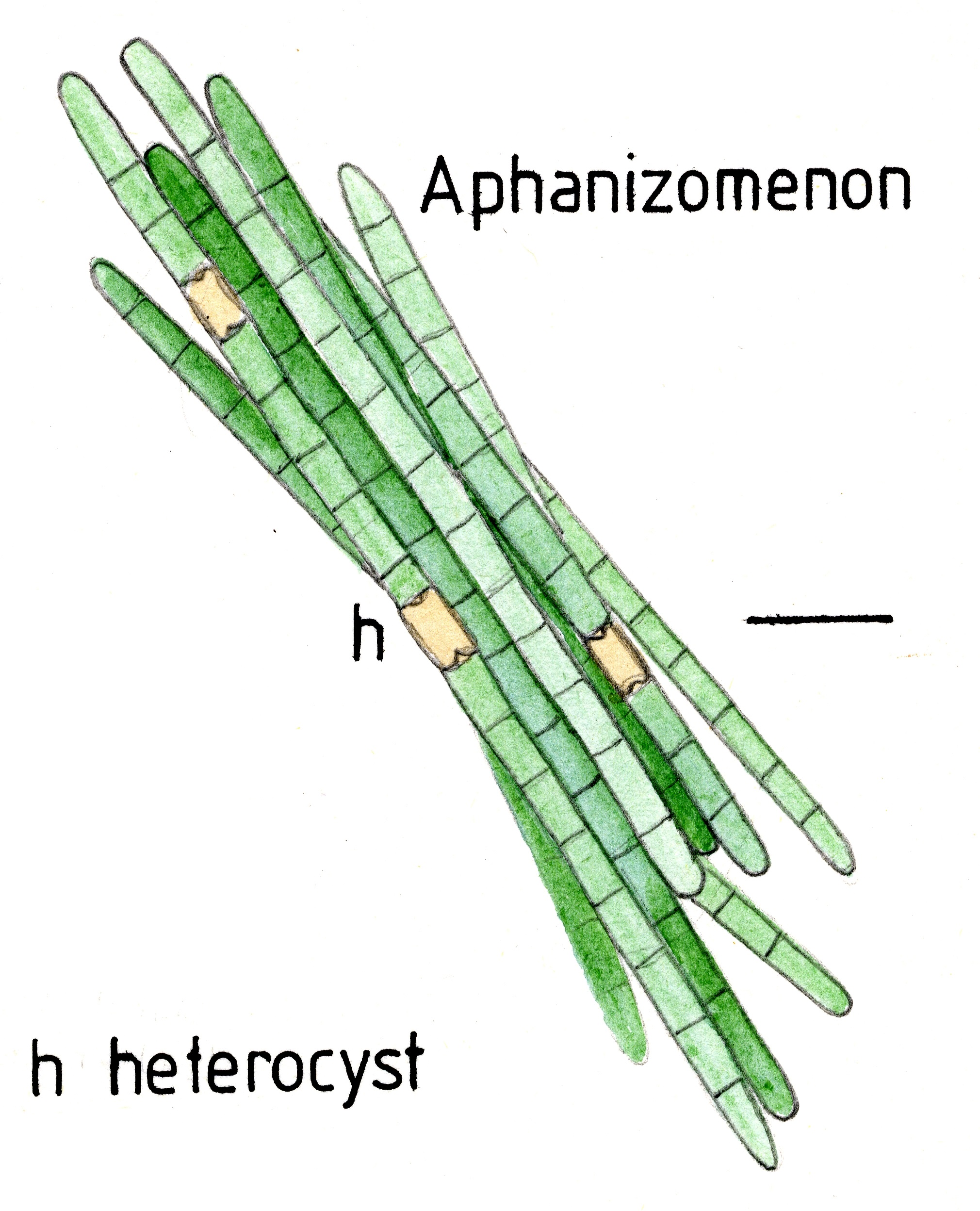
Heterocysts on Aphanizomenon flos-aquae

One of the main morphological characteristics of the genus Aphanizomenon is the tendency to form fascicles of trichomes containing mainly vegetative cells.

The individual vegetative cells that form Aphanizomenon flos-aquae are cylindrical and elongated. Each cell is composed of hyaline.

Aphanizomenon flos-aquae forms typically bent trichomes that are grouped into fascicles up to 2 cm (0.79 in) long. These trichomes can also be found as single free-floating units. Within these fascicles, heterocysts often appear at various intervals on the trichomes.

When attached to a trichome, heterocysts import carbohydrates which may act as a reducing agent and an energy source for nitrogen fixation. It has been shown that heterocysts contain a nitrogenase complex which allows them to take part in nitrogen fixation. Other requirements for nitrogen fixation include ATP, low potential electrons, and an anaerobic environment.

== Life cycle ==
The life cycle of Aphanizomenon flos-aquae depends on various environmental conditions such as water temperature, dissolved oxygen content, and pH.

During the winter, Aphanizomenon flos-aquae persists as akinetes deep in the layers of sediment. These dormant cyanobacterial cells will last all season until the water temperature rises again in the spring. During the springtime, the akinetes go through a recruitment phase as they germinate and disperse into the water column. Different species of phytoplankton can provide interspecific competition for Aphanizomenon flos-aquae if they are outnumbered. Due to higher temperatures, and higher pH levels in the summer, Aphanizomenon flos-aquae begin to flourish and eventually form dense mats known as 'blooms' in late summer. The blooms dissipate in autumn as the water temperature and pH drop again and the conditions are more favorable to akinete development.

== Ecology ==
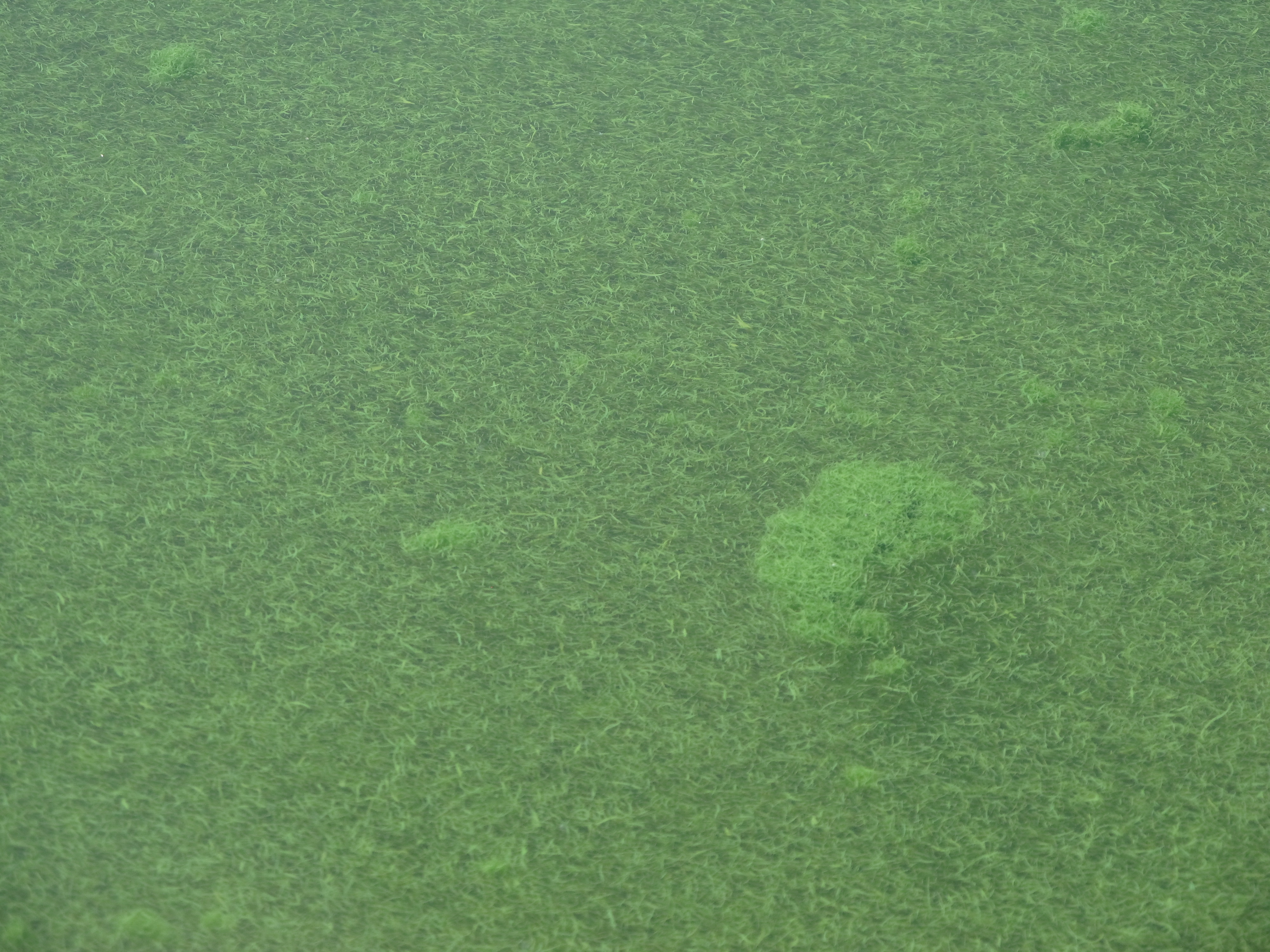
Edible variety of AFA (Aphanizomenon flos-aquae) bloom on the Upper Klamath Lake, Oregon

Aphanizomenon flos-aquae can form dense surface aggregations in freshwater (known as "cyanobacterial blooms"). These blooms occur in areas of high nutrient loading, historical or current.

During bloom formation, Aphanizomenon flos-aquae photosynthetically produces biomass. These accumulated mats of biomass can grow due to the concentration of nutrients available in eutrophic ecosystems accompanied by high reproductive rates and water temperatures.

At high concentrations, these blooms can be ecologically harmful to the aquatic species that cohabitate with the cyanobacteria. In addition to their odoriferous presence, cyanobacterial blooms have been associated with lowered dissolved oxygen content, increased turbidity, and the accelerated release of nutrients from sediments.

== Toxicity and safety ==
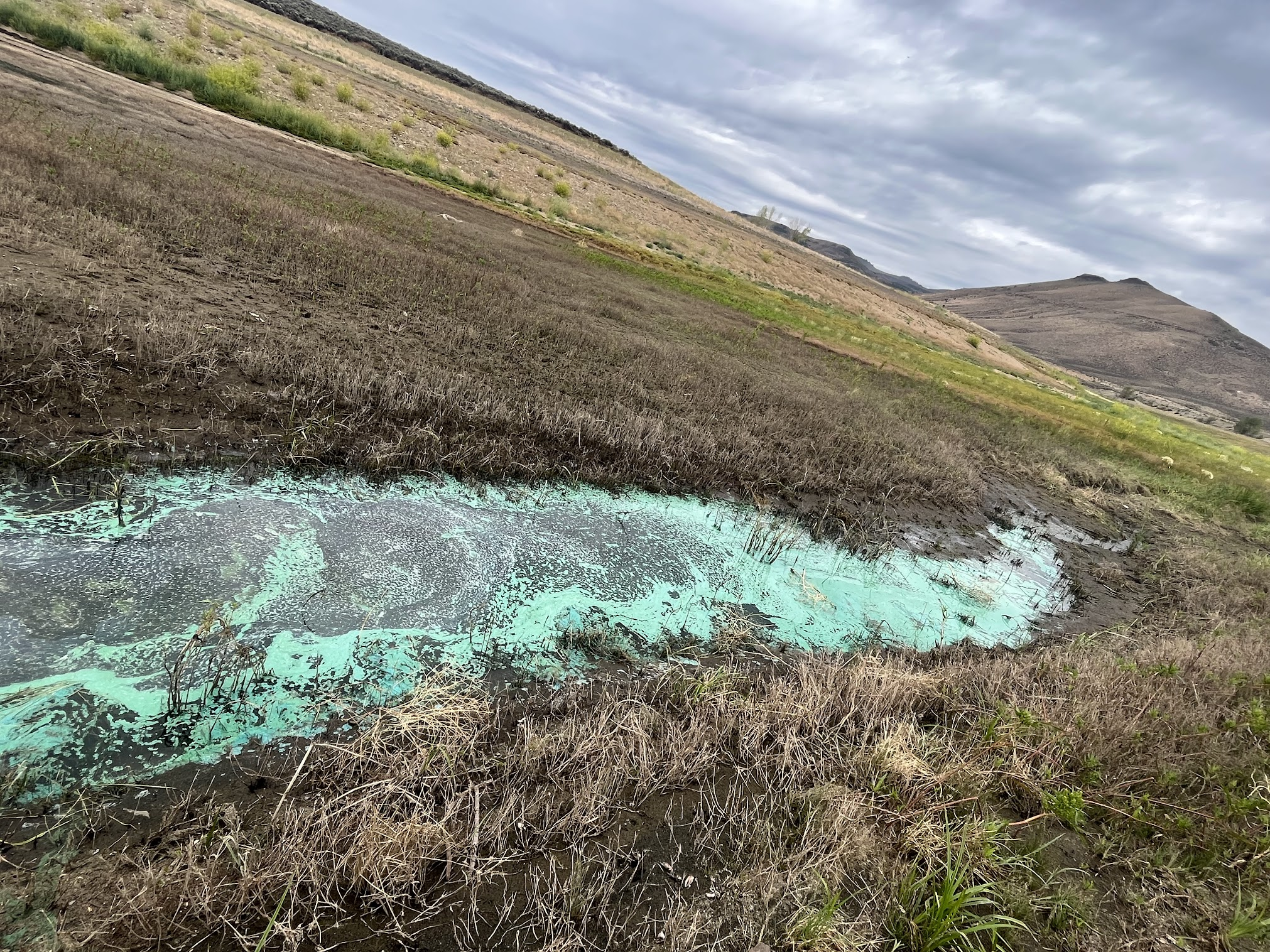
Toxic Algal Bloom in an inlet of Blue Mesa Reservoir in Western Colorado

Aphanizomenon flos-aquae (AFA) includes both toxic and non-toxic strains found in various global freshwater sources, with different varieties producing diverse compounds.

The toxicity of A. flos-aquae has been reported in:

- China (2003), where a cell culture of A. flos-aquae was used to produce saxitoxin, in turn used for animal testing.
- Canada (2005), where microcystin synthase genes (McyE highly (> 95%) similar to the version in Microcystis aeruginosa is detected in supplement products.
- Germany (2006), where two lakes contains two strains of A. flos-aquae that produce cylindrospermopsin in culture.
- Germany (2012), where 18 samples of improperly harvested AFA used in supplement products were shown to be cross-contaminated with microcystin. 10 of the 18 samples exceeded the safe concentration limit of 1 μg/g, with the authors stating that the "distribution and commercial sale of AFA products, whether pure or mixed formulations, for human consumption appear highly questionable." The McyE gene was detected, but it was not sequenced, so its origin cannot be confirmed.

Some Aphanizomenon flos-aquae varieties are known to produce toxic chemicals that are only released when cells die. Once released (lysed), and ingested, these toxins can damage liver and nerve tissues in mammals. In areas where water quality is not closely monitored, the World Health Organization has assessed toxic algae as a health risk, citing the production of anatoxin-a, saxitoxins, and cylindrospermopsin. Dogs have been reported to have become ill or have fatal reactions after swimming in rivers and lakes containing toxic A. flos-aquae.

The FDA recognizes wild-harvested AFA as safe for consumption as food or in dietary supplements.

== See also ==
- Spirulina (dietary supplement)
- Klamath Lake AFA
