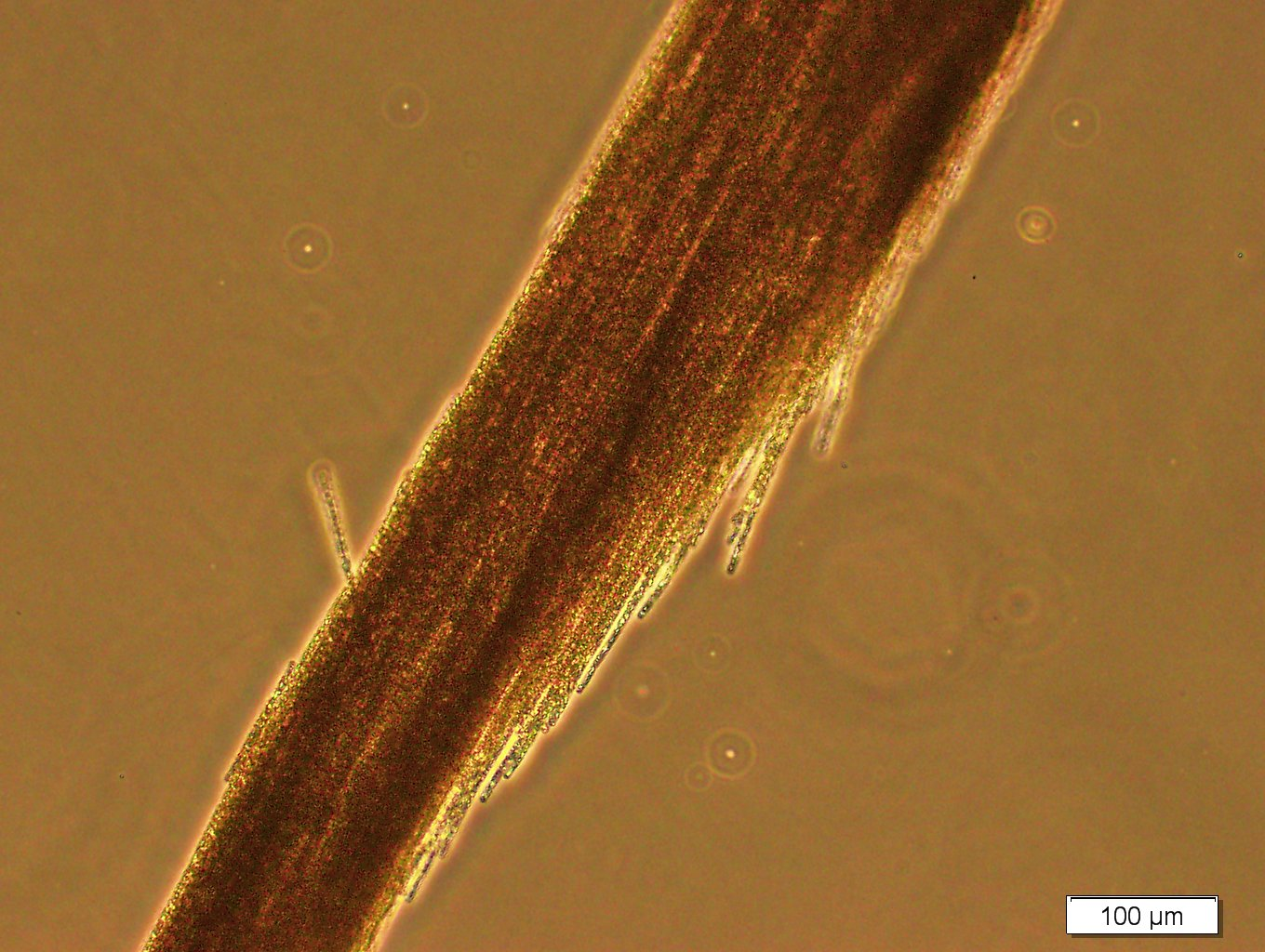
- Aphanizomenon flos-aquae

Scientific classification
- Domain: Bacteria
- Kingdom: Bacillati
- Phylum: Cyanobacteriota
- Class: Cyanophyceae
- Order: Nostocales
- Family: Aphanizomenonaceae
- Genus: Aphanizomenon; A.Morren ex Bornet & Flahault, 1888

Species
- See #Species.

= Aphanizomenon =

Genus of bacteria

Aphanizomenon is a genus of cyanobacteria that inhabits freshwater lakes and can cause dense blooms. These cyanobacteria are unicellular organisms that form linear (non-branching) chains known as trichomes. Parallel trichomes can further unite into aggregates called rafts. Cyanobacteria such as Aphanizomenon are known for using photosynthesis to create energy and thus rely on sunlight as their energy source. Aphanizomenon bacteria also play a significant role in the Nitrogen cycle due to their ability to perform nitrogen fixation. Studies on the species Aphanizomenon flos-aquae have shown that it can regulate buoyancy through light-induced changes in turgor pressure. The genus is also capable of gliding motility, although the specific mechanism responsible for this ability remains unknown.

== Species ==
Species and synonymy from AlgaeBase:

- Aphanizomenon americanum E.G.Reinhard, 1896 S → Aphanizomenon flos-aquae
- Aphanizomenon aphanizomenoides (Forti) Horecká & Komárek, 1979 S → Sphaerospermopsis aphanizomenoides
- Aphanizomenon balticum Willén et al. U
- Aphanizomenon capricorni Cronberg & Komárek, 2004 S → Cuspidothrix capricorni
- Aphanizomenon chinense Negoro, 1943 C
- "Aphanizomenon cyaneum" Ralfs ex Bornet & Flahault, 1888 S → Aphanizomenon flos-aquae
- Aphanizomenon elenkinii Kisselev, 1951 S → Aphanizomenon flos-aquae
- Aphanizomenon favaloroi S.H.Otaño, 2012 C
- Aphanizomenon flexuosum Komárek & Kovácik, 1989 C
- Aphanizomenon flos-aquae Ralfs ex Bornet & Flahault, 1886 C – see note
- Aphanizomenon gracile Lemmermann, 1907 C
- Aphanizomenon holsaticum P.G.Richter, 1896 S → Aphanizomenon flos-aquae
- Aphanizomenon hungaricum Komárková-Legnerová & Mátyás, 1995 C
- Aphanizomenon incurvum Morren ex Bornet & Flahault, 1886 C
- Aphanizomenon issatschenkoi (Usachev) Proshkina-Lavrenko, 1968 → Cuspidothrix issatschenkoi
- Aphanizomenon kaufmannii Schmidle, 1914 S → Cylindrospermopsis raciborskii
- Aphanizomenon klebahnii (Elenkin) Pechar & Kalina ex Komárek & Komárková, 2006 C
- Aphanizomenon manguinii Bourrelly, 1952 C
- Aphanizomenon morrenii Kufferath, 1942 C
- Aphanizomenon ovalisporum Forti, 1911 S → Umezakia ovalisporum
- Aphanizomenon paraflexuosum M.Watanabe, 1991 C
- Aphanizomenon platense Seckt, 1922 C
- Aphanizomenon schindleri Kling, Findlay & Komárek, 1994 C
- Aphanizomenon skujae Komárková-Legnerová & Cronberg, 1992 C
- Aphanizomenon slovenicum Rekar & Hindak, 2002 C
- Aphanizomenon sphaericum Kisselev, 1955 S → Aphanizomenon aphanizomenoides
- Aphanizomenon strictum Nayal, 1932 U
- Aphanizomenon tropicale Horecká & Komárek, 1979 S → Cuspidothrix tropicalis
- Aphanizomenon ussaczevii Proshkino-Lavrenko, 1968 S → Cuspidothrix ussaczevii
- Aphanizomenon volzii (Lemmermann) Komárek, 1984 S → Macrospermum volzii
- Aphanizomenon yezoense M.Watanabe, 1991 C

('C' indicates a name that is accepted taxonomically; 'S' a homotypic or heterotypic synonym; 'U' indicates a name of uncertain taxonomic status, but which has been subjected to some verification nomenclaturally; 'P' indicates a preliminary AlgaeBase entry that has not been subjected to any kind of verification.)

=== Notes beyond AlgaeBase classification ===
The genus is defined by morphology. Improvements in classification according to molecular phylogeny has moved many commonly-mentioned species out of the genus.

Cires et al. (2016) states that modern Aphanizomenon is a "well-defined cluster of eight morphospecies".

Aphanizomenon flos-aquae (probably all of modern Aphanizomenon) is cladistically included in Dolichospermum, but was not moved to the genus. Dolichospermum flos-aquae refers to a different species. Wacklin et al. (2009) argues that the paraphyly of Dolichospermum is acceptable so long as the other genera under the clade have unique and distinct morphological features.

Aphanizomenon gracile is noted as phylogenetically different (16S close to Anabaena flos-aquae, Anabaena lemmermannii, both of which are in Dolichospermum since Wacklin et al. (2009)) but not yet formally renamed in Cires et al. (2016). GTDB algorithmically assigns it as Dolichospermum gracile.

Many of sequenced the morphospecies in Anabaena, Dolichospermum, and Aphanizomenon (ADA clade) are not monophyletic. Work is underway to sequence more genomes from these genera to produce a species classification based on genetic branching. Aphanizomenon flos-aquae specifically mostly falls into one clade-species, with a minority of sequences falling into another.

== Ecology ==
=== Overcoming phosphate limitation ===
Aphanizomenon may become dominant in a water body partially due to their ability to induce phosphate-limitation in other phytoplankton while also increasing phosphate availability to itself through release of cylindrospermopsin. The cylindrospermopsin causes other phytoplankton to increase their alkaline phosphatase activity, increasing inorganic phosphate availability in the water to Aphanizomenon during times when phosphate becomes limiting.

=== Photosynthesis ===
All species in the cyanobacteria phylum can perform photosynthesis. They use a similar photosynthesis to plants, using two photosystems which is called the Z-scheme. This is different from other photosynthetic bacteria that only use one photosystem and do not have thylakoids. Cyanobacteria species such as Aphanizomenon also use Oxygen as their final electron acceptor in the Electron Transport Chain, which is also different from other photosynthetic bacteria, which perform a type of photosynthesis called anoxygenic photosynthesis.

=== Nitrogen fixation ===
Aphanizomenon are a special type of cyanobacteria called heterocysts, which are capable of producing biologically useful nitrogen (ammonium) by the process of nitrogen fixation from atmospheric nitrogen.

A large proportion (between 35 and 50%) of fixed nitrogen may be released into the surrounding water, providing an important source of biologically available nitrogen to the ecosystem. Since Aphanizomenon are one of the few species of bacteria that can perform nitrogen fixation, other bacterial species that use nitrogen ions as a reactant will start to rely on the species as a source of usable nitrogen. This will cause a bacterial bloom to form, which is a condition under which the number of bacterial colonies in an area will suddenly increase.

=== Algal blooms ===
Aphanizomenon can produce algal blooms from producing usable nitrogen causing other bacterial species to form colonies around the Aphanizomenon. Algal Blooms formed from Aphanizomenon species tend to be very toxic and create a variety of toxins. These blooms may also create dead zones in the water. This ends up being bad for the ecosystem, since it can hurt many of the plants and animals living around it.

=== Toxin production ===
Aphanizomenon species may produce cyanotoxins including cylindrospermospin (CYN), lipopolysaccharides (LPS), anatoxin-a, saxitoxin and BMAA. Though not all Aphanizomenon produce cyanotoxins, many do. CYNs are a toxin that is especially toxic for the liver and kidney, thought to inhibit protein synthesis. LPSs are found in the cellular membrane of gram-negative bacterial cells and is released when the cellular membrane is degraded. The releasing of LPSs in animals can cause a severe immune response causing it to be very toxic for animals. Anatoxin-a is a type of anatoxin, it is normally released during algal blooms in lakes, causing exposure to animals around it. Anatoxin-a is toxic to the nerves in animals and is very lethal to humans with a lethal dose thought to be less than 5 mg. Similarly to anatoxin-a, BMAAs are another type of neurotoxin that lingers inside animals for longer than anatoxin-a. It will keep affecting animals even after an algal bloom dies down. Last, saxitoxins is yet another type of neurotoxin known to be released by a species of Aphanizomenon. It interrupts nerve transmissions to and from the brain, causing it to be very toxic.

=== Colony formation ===
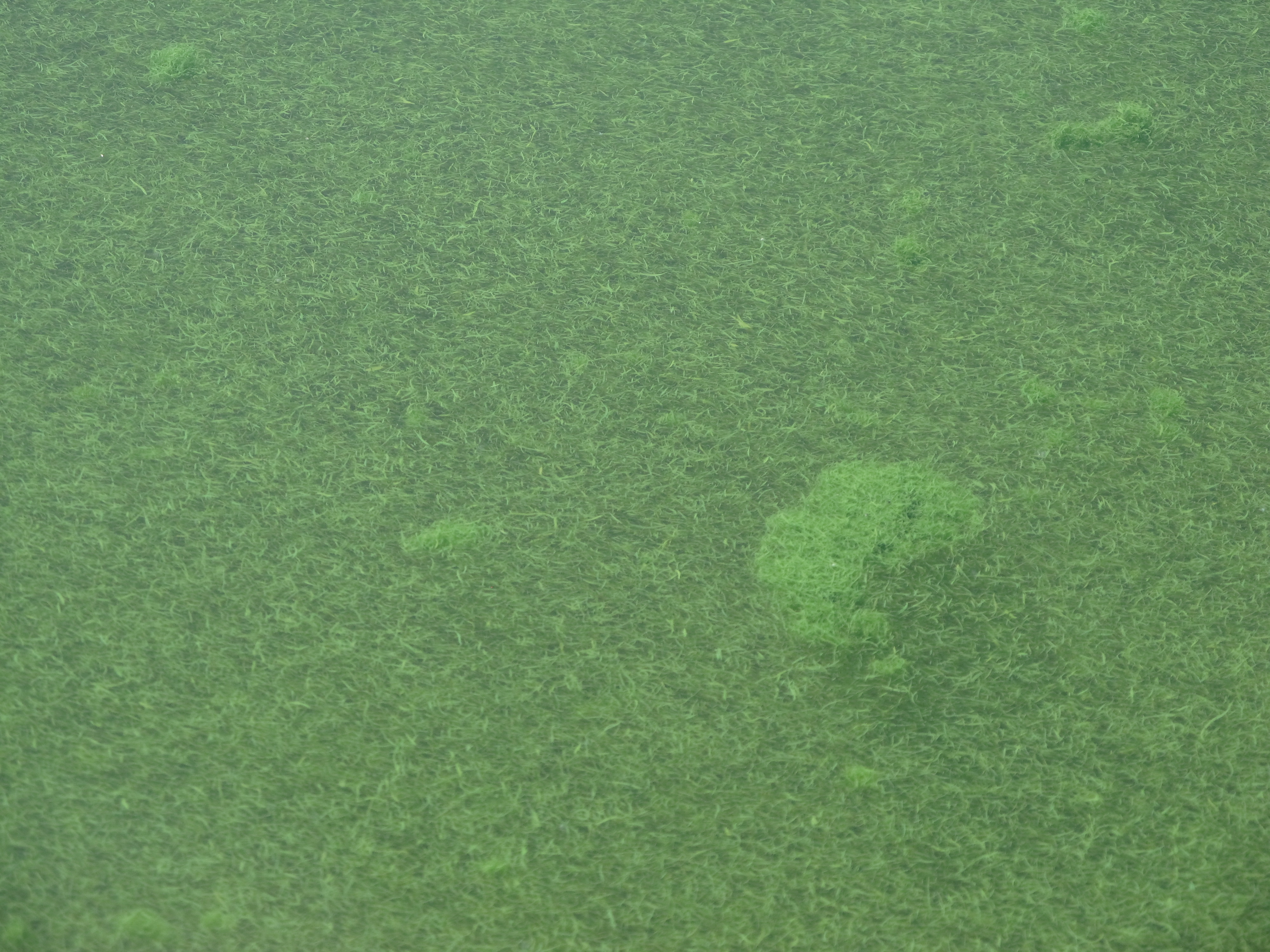
Aphanizomenon flos-aquae bloom on the Upper Klamath Lake, Oregon

Aphanizomenon may form large colonies as a defense against herbivore grazing, especially Daphnia in freshwater.

== See also ==
- Anatoxin (disambiguation)
- Cylindrospermopsin
- Saxitoxin
- Cyanotoxin
