= Klamath Lake AFA =

Algae used as a dietary supplement

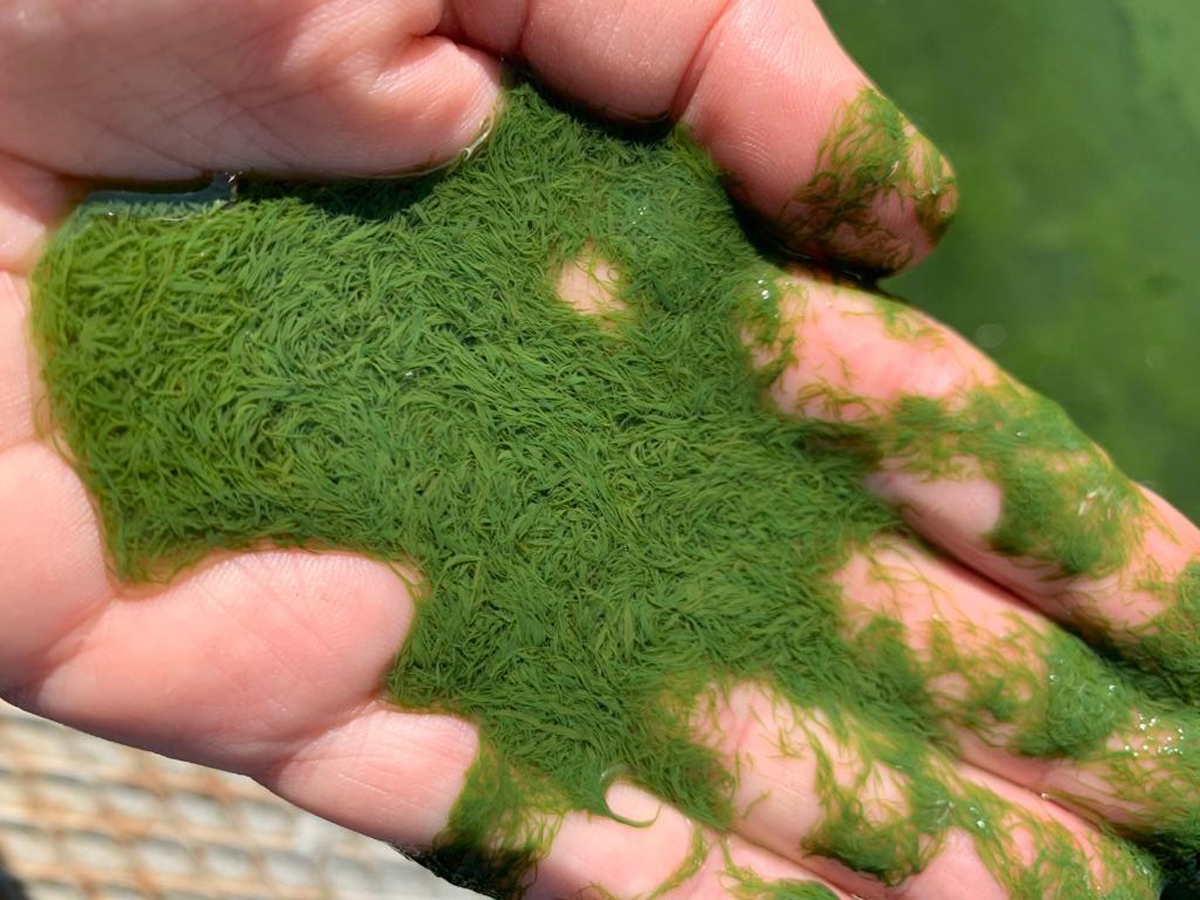
Upper Klamath Lake AFA

Aphanizomenon flos-aquae harvested from Upper Klamath Lake in Oregon, or simply Klamath Lake AFA or Klamath AFA, is a cyanobacterial biomass that has been harvested wild from Upper Klamath Lake since the 1980s for use in dietary supplements. Small amounts of A. flos-aquae can be found in bodies of water worldwide, but it is notable for growing prolifically in Upper Klamath Lake in Oregon.

The primary strain is Aphanizomenon flos-aquae MDT14a. Ap. flos-aquae was historically treated as a single homogeneous species, but genome sequencing has revealed significant diversity within the group, with some subgroups more appropriately categorized as distinct species. Average nucleotide identity comparison identifies MDT14a as belonging to the same genomic species as strain LD13 (MDT13), also isolated from the Upper Klamath Lake, at 99.29% ANI.

== Taxonomy ==
The classification of Aphanizomenon flos-aquae has undergone significant taxonomic revision in light of recent genomic studies that have revealed substantial genetic variability, leading to the identification of distinct strains found around the world. These advancements have clarified a longstanding misconception regarding toxin production in Ap. flos-aquae samples from Upper Klamath Lake. Earlier studies attributed the presence of cyanotoxins such as microcystin and cylindrospermopsin directly to production by Ap. flos-aquae. However, genome sequencing and species-specific analysis has revealed that Klamath AFA is incapable of producing microcystins or other toxins, but were instead the result of cross-contamination from co-occurring toxin-producing cyanobacteria living in the same environment, most commonly with species of Microcystis.

The following cyanobacteria of the "Anabaena, Dolichospermum, and Aphanizomenon" (ADA) clade have been isolated from Upper Klamath Lake, with their full genomes sequenced:

| Depositor nomenclature | Driscoll clade | GTDB nomenclature (Note: See Aphanizomenon flos-aquae § Genomes for a discussion of the status of GTDB "Dolichospermum flosaquae".) |
|---|---|---|
| Anabaena sp. MDT14b | ADA-2 | Dolichospermum lemmermannii |
| Ap. flos-aquae MDT14a | ADA-4 | "Dolichospermum flosaquae" |
| Ap. flos-aquae LD13 | ADA-4 | "Dolichospermum flosaquae" |

None of the three above strains carry any toxin biosynthetic genes. None of the ADA-4 strains tested (the two above, WA113 from Cranberry Lake, and WA102 from Anderson Lake) carry any toxin-producing genes.

== Habitat ==
Upper Klamath Lake in the Cascade Range of south-central Oregon hosts a viable and harvestable population of Ap. flos-aquae, primarily the strain Ap. flos-aquae MDT14a.

Klamath Lake's high levels of dissolved minerals, large surface area, shallow depths, and other nutritional and environmental factors create suitable conditions for the proliferation of Ap. flos-aquae. Some of these factors are the lake's high 4,100 feet (1,259 m) elevation, eutrophic nutrient levels, high alkalinity (8.5 pH or higher), a large surface area of 96 square miles with an average depth of 8 feet, and nearly 300 sunny days per year.

== Product recalls ==
Cross-contamination of products containing Klamath AFA have occurred in the past. From 2018 to 2020, the Food and Drug Administration did three product recalls, all by the same original harvesting company. Each recall found higher levels of microcystin than suggested by the WHO and EPA provisional guidelines, which is less than 1 microgram per gram. These investigations led to Class 2 voluntary recalls of the affected products. The products were all linked to several batches of AFA harvested by the company between 2015 and 2017. From these recalls, the FDA started working with harvesting companies to outline new industry practices and testing procedures for harvesting AFA. These now include:

1. At the time of harvest, examining AFA at the harvesting site for contaminating cyanobacteria.
2. At the time of harvest, testing the water and AFA for microcystins.
3. After harvest, testing the AFA slurry for microcystins.
4. Before selling AFA products, testing each lot or batch for microcystins.
5. Using more than one test method to confirm results.
6. Using a test method that can detect multiple variant forms of microcystins.
7. Using certified testing laboratories and validated methods.
8. Providing a certificate of analysis to purchasers for each lot or batch sold.

Since these guidelines were developed, no product recalls have occurred. As of 2024, the FDA states that wild-harvested cyanobacteria is safe to eat.

== See also ==
- Chlorophyll
- Phenethylamine
- Phycocyanin
