= Non-proteinogenic amino acids =

Amino acids not naturally encoded in the genome

Euler diagram showing that the 22 proteinogenic amino acids are a small fraction of all amino acids

In biochemistry, non-coded or non-proteinogenic amino acids are distinct from the 22 proteinogenic amino acids (21 in eukaryotes (Note: plus formylmethionine in eukaryotes with prokaryote organelles like mitochondria)), which are naturally encoded in the genome of organisms for the assembly of proteins. However, over 140 non-proteinogenic amino acids occur naturally in proteins (but not included in the genetic code) and thousands more may occur in nature or be synthesized in the laboratory. Chemically synthesized amino acids are often referred to as unnatural or non-canonical amino acids. Unnatural amino acids can be synthetically prepared from their native analogs via modifications such as amine alkylation, side chain substitution, structural bond extension cyclization, and isosteric replacements within the amino acid backbone. Many non-proteinogenic amino acids are important:

- intermediates in biosynthesis,
- in post-translational formation of proteins,
- in a physiological role (e.g. components of bacterial cell walls, neurotransmitters and toxins),
- natural or man-made pharmacological compounds,
- present in meteorites or used in prebiotic experiments (such as the Miller–Urey experiment),
- might be important neurotransmitters, such as γ-aminobutyric acid, and
- can play a crucial role in cellular bioenergetics, such as creatine.

== Definition by negation ==
Lysine

Technically, any organic compound with an amine (–NH_{2}) and a carboxylic acid (–COOH) functional group is an amino acid. The proteinogenic amino acids are a small subset of this group that possess a central carbon atom (α- or 2-) bearing an amino group, a carboxyl group, a side chain and an α-hydrogen levo conformation, with the exception of glycine, which is achiral, and proline, whose amine group is a secondary amine and is consequently frequently referred to as an imino acid for traditional reasons, albeit not an imino.

The genetic code encodes 20 standard amino acids for incorporation into proteins during translation. However, there are two extra proteinogenic amino acids: selenocysteine and pyrrolysine. These non-standard amino acids do not have a dedicated codon, but are added in place of a stop codon when a specific sequence is present, UGA codon and SECIS element for selenocysteine, UAG PYLIS downstream sequence for pyrrolysine. All other amino acids are termed "non-proteinogenic".

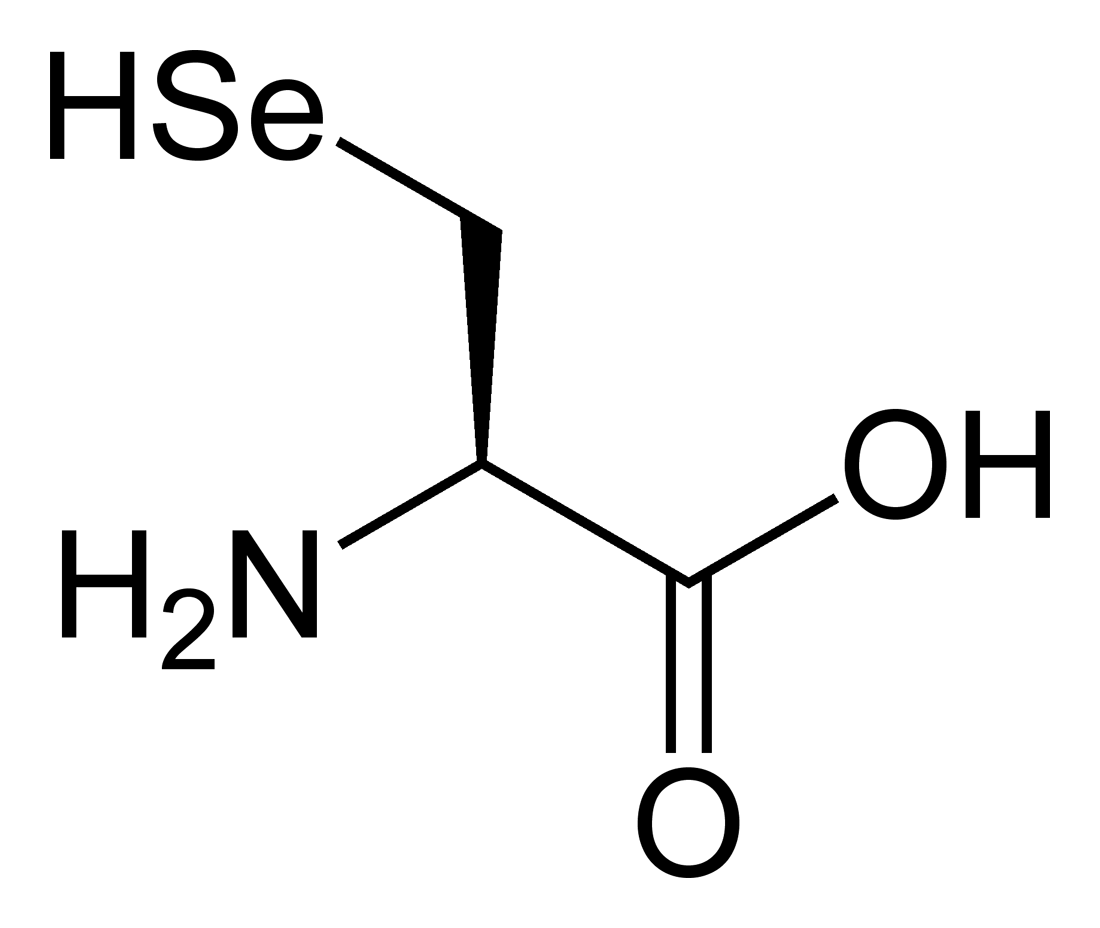
Selenocysteine. This amino acid contains a selenol group on its β-carbon

Pyrrolysine. This amino acid is formed by joining to the ε-amino group of lysine a carboxylated pyrroline ring

There are various groups of amino acids:

- 20 standard amino acids
- 22 proteinogenic amino acids
- over 80 amino acids created abiotically in high concentrations
- about 900 are produced by natural pathways
- over 118 engineered amino acids have been placed into proteins

These groups overlap, but are not identical. All 22 proteinogenic amino acids are biosynthesised by organisms and some, but not all, of them also are abiotic (found in prebiotic experiments and meteorites). Some natural amino acids, such as norleucine, are misincorporated translationally into proteins due to infidelity of the protein-synthesis process. Many amino acids, such as ornithine, are metabolic intermediates produced biosynthetically, but not incorporated translationally into proteins. Post-translational modification of amino acid residues in proteins leads to the formation of many proteinaceous, but non-proteinogenic, amino acids. Other amino acids are solely found in abiotic mixes (e.g. α-methylnorvaline). Over 30 unnatural amino acids have been inserted translationally into proteins in engineered systems, yet are not biosynthetic.

== Nomenclature ==
In addition to the IUPAC numbering system to differentiate the various carbons in an organic molecule, by sequentially assigning a number to each carbon, including those forming a carboxylic group, the carbons along the side-chain of amino acids can also be labelled with Greek letters, where the α-carbon is the central chiral carbon possessing a carboxyl group, a side chain and, in α-amino acids, an amino group – the carbon in carboxylic groups is not counted. (Consequently, the IUPAC names of many non-proteinogenic α-amino acids start with 2-amino- and end in -ic acid.)

== Natural non-L-α-amino acids ==
Most natural amino acids are α-amino acids in the L configuration, but some exceptions exist.

=== Non-alpha ===

Some non-α-amino acids exist in organisms. In these structures, the amine group is displaced further from the carboxylic acid end of the amino acid molecule. Thus a β-amino acid has the amine group bonded to the second carbon away, and a γ-amino acid has it on the third. Examples include β-alanine, GABA, and δ-aminolevulinic acid.

β-Alanine: an amino acid produced by aspartate 1-decarboxylase and a precursor to coenzyme A and the peptides carnosine and anserine.

γ-Aminobutyric acid (GABA): a neurotransmitter in animals.

δ-Aminolevulinic acid: an intermediate in tetrapyrrole biosynthesis (haem, chlorophyll, cobalamin etc.).

4-Aminobenzoic acid (PABA): an intermediate in folate biosynthesis

The reason why α-amino acids are used in proteins has been linked to their frequency in meteorites and prebiotic experiments. An initial speculation on the deleterious properties of β-amino acids in terms of secondary structure turned out to be incorrect.

=== D-amino acids ===
Some amino acids contain the opposite absolute chirality, chemicals that are not available from normal ribosomal translation and transcription machinery. Most bacterial cells walls are formed by peptidoglycan, a polymer composed of amino sugars crosslinked with short oligopeptides bridged between each other. The oligopeptide is non-ribosomally synthesised and contains several peculiarities including D-amino acids, generally D-alanine and D-glutamate. A further peculiarity is that the former is racemised by a PLP-binding enzymes (encoded by alr or the homologue dadX), whereas the latter is racemised by a cofactor independent enzyme (murI). Some variants are present, in Thermotoga spp. D-Lysine is present and in certain vancomycin-resistant bacteria D-serine is present (vanT gene).

=== Without a hydrogen on the α-carbon ===
All proteinogenic amino acids have at least one hydrogen on the α-carbon. Glycine has two hydrogens, and all others have one hydrogen and one side-chain. Replacement of the remaining hydrogen with a larger substituent, such as a methyl group, distorts the protein backbone.

In some fungi α-aminoisobutyric acid is produced as a precursor to peptides, some of which exhibit antibiotic properties. This compound is similar to alanine, but possesses an additional methyl group on the α-carbon instead of a hydrogen. It is therefore achiral. Another compound similar to alanine without an α-hydrogen is dehydroalanine, which possesses a methylene sidechain. It is one of several naturally occurring dehydroamino acids.

alanine

aminoisobutyric acid

dehydroalanine

=== Twin amino acid stereocentres ===
A subset of L-α-amino acids are ambiguous as to which of two ends is the α-carbon. In proteins a cysteine residue can form a disulfide bond with another cysteine residue, thus crosslinking the protein. Two crosslinked cysteines form a cystine molecule. Cysteine and methionine are generally produced by direct sulfurylation, but in some species they can be produced by transsulfuration, where the activated homoserine or serine is fused to a cysteine or homocysteine forming cystathionine. A similar compound is lanthionine, which can be seen as two alanine molecules joined via a thioether bond and is found in various organisms. Similarly, djenkolic acid, a plant toxin from jengkol beans, is composed of two cysteines connected by a methylene group. Diaminopimelic acid is both used as a bridge in peptidoglycan and is used a precursor to lysine (via its decarboxylation).

cystine

cystathionine

lanthionine

djenkolic acid

diaminopimelic acid

== Prebiotic amino acids and alternative biochemistries ==
In meteorites and in prebiotic experiments (e.g. Miller–Urey experiment) many more amino acids than the twenty standard amino acids are found, several of which are at higher concentrations than the standard ones. It has been conjectured that if amino acid based life were to arise elsewhere in the universe, no more than 75% of the amino acids would be in common. The most notable anomaly is the lack of aminobutyric acid.

Proportion of amino acids relative to glycine (%)
Molecule	Electric discharge	Murchinson meteorite
glycine	100	100
alanine	180	36
α-amino-n-butyric acid	61	19
norvaline	14	14
valine	4.4	
norleucine	1.4	
leucine	2.6	
isoleucine	1.1	
alloisoleucine	1.2	
t-leucine	< 0.005	
α-amino-n-heptanoic acid	0.3	
proline	0.3	22
pipecolic acid	0.01	11
α,β-diaminopropionic acid	1.5	
α,γ-diaminobutyric acid	7.6	
ornithine	< 0.01	
lysine	< 0.01	
aspartic acid	7.7	13
glutamic acid	1.7	20
serine	1.1	
threonine	0.2	
allothreonine	0.2	
methionine	0.1	
homocysteine	0.5	
homoserine	0.5	
β-alanine	4.3	10
β-amino-n-butyric acid	0.1	5
β-aminoisobutyric acid	0.5	7
γ-aminobutyric acid	0.5	7
α-aminoisobutyric acid	7	33
isovaline	1	11
sarcosine	12.5	7
N-ethylglycine	6.8	6
N-propylglycine	0.5	
N-isopropylglycine	0.5	
N-methylalanine	3.4	3
N-ethylalanine	< 0.05	
N-methyl-β-alanine	1.0	
N-ethyl-β-alanine	< 0.05	
isoserine	1.2	
α-hydroxy-γ-aminobutyric acid	17	

=== Straight side chain ===
The genetic code has been described as a frozen accident and the reasons why there is only one standard amino acid with a straight chain, alanine, could simply be redundancy with valine, leucine and isoleucine. However, straight chained amino acids are reported to form much more stable alpha helices.

glycine (hydrogen side-chain)

alanine (methyl side-chain)

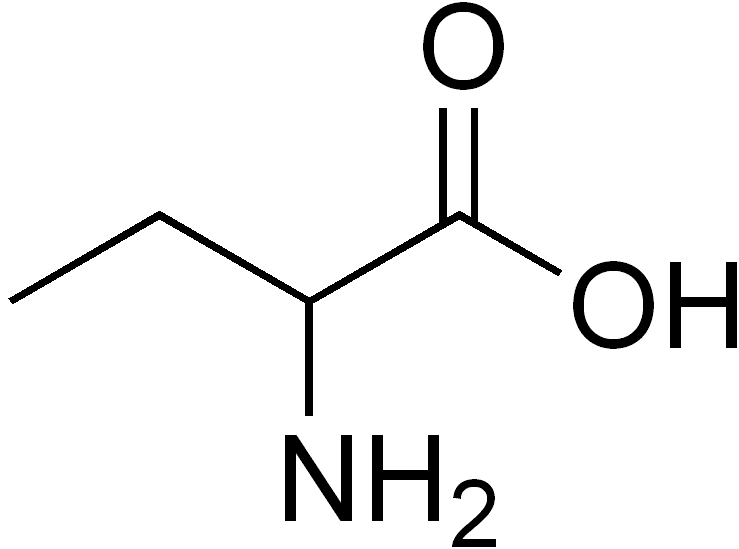
homoalanine, or α-aminobutyric acid (ethyl side-chain)

norvaline (n-propyl side-chain)

norleucine (n-butyl side-chain)

=== Chalcogen ===
Serine, homoserine, O-methylhomoserine and O-ethylhomoserine possess a hydroxymethyl, hydroxyethyl, O-methylhydroxymethyl and O-methylhydroxyethyl side chain; whereas cysteine, homocysteine, methionine and ethionine possess the thiol equivalents. The selenol equivalents are selenocysteine, selenohomocysteine, selenomethionine and selenoethionine. Amino acids with the next chalcogen down are also found in nature: several species such as Aspergillus fumigatus, Aspergillus terreus, and Penicillium chrysogenum in the absence of sulfur are able to produce and incorporate into protein tellurocysteine and telluromethionine.

== Roles ==
In cells, especially autotrophs, several non-proteinogenic amino acids are found as metabolic intermediates. However, despite the catalytic flexibility of PLP-binding enzymes, many amino acids are synthesised as keto acids (such as 4-methyl-2-oxopentanoate to leucine) and aminated in the last step, thus keeping the number of non-proteinogenic amino acid intermediates fairly low.

Ornithine and citrulline occur in the urea cycle, part of amino acid catabolism (see below).

In addition to primary metabolism, several non-proteinogenic amino acids are precursors or the final production in secondary metabolism to make small compounds or non-ribosomal peptides (such as some toxins).

=== Post-translationally incorporated into protein ===
Despite not being encoded by the genetic code as proteinogenic amino acids, some non-standard amino acids are nevertheless found in proteins. These are formed by post-translational modification of the side chains of standard amino acids present in the target protein. These modifications are often essential for the function or regulation of a protein; for example, in γ-carboxyglutamate the carboxylation of glutamate allows for better binding of calcium cations, and in hydroxyproline the hydroxylation of proline is critical for maintaining connective tissues. Another example is the formation of hypusine in the translation initiation factor EIF5A, through modification of a lysine residue. Such modifications can also determine the localization of the protein, for example, the addition of long hydrophobic groups can cause a protein to bind to a phospholipid membrane.

Carboxyglutamic acid. Whereas glutamic acid possess one γ-carboxyl group, Carboxyglutamic acid possess two.

Hydroxyproline. This imino acid differs from proline due to a hydroxyl group on carbon 4.

Hypusine. This amino acid is obtained by adding to the ε-amino group of a lysine a 4-aminobutyl moiety (obtained from spermidine)

Pyroglutamic acid

There is some preliminary evidence that aminomalonic acid may be present, possibly by misincorporation, in protein.

== Toxic analogues ==
Several non-proteinogenic amino acids are toxic due to their ability to mimic certain properties of proteinogenic amino acids, such as thialysine. Some non-proteinogenic amino acids are neurotoxic by mimicking amino acids used as neurotransmitters (that is, not for protein biosynthesis), including quisqualic acid, canavanine, caramboxin and azetidine-2-carboxylic acid. Cephalosporin C has an α-aminoadipic acid (homoglutamate) backbone that is amidated with a cephalosporin moiety. Penicillamine is a therapeutic amino acid, whose mode of action is unknown.

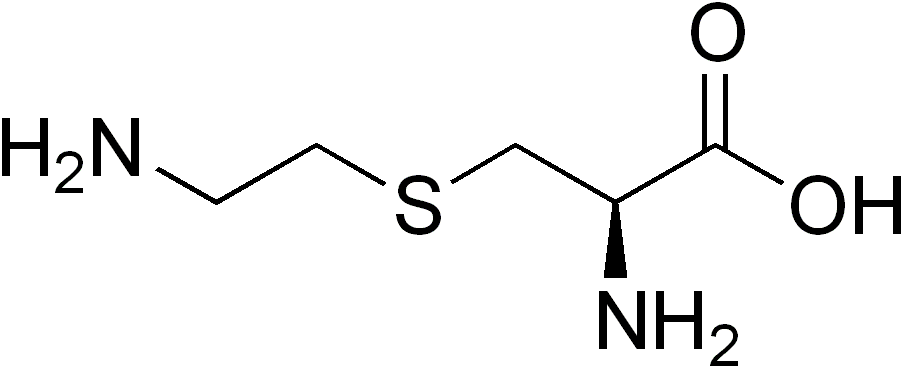
Thialysine

quisqualic acid

canavanine

azetidine-2-carboxylic acid

cephalosporin C

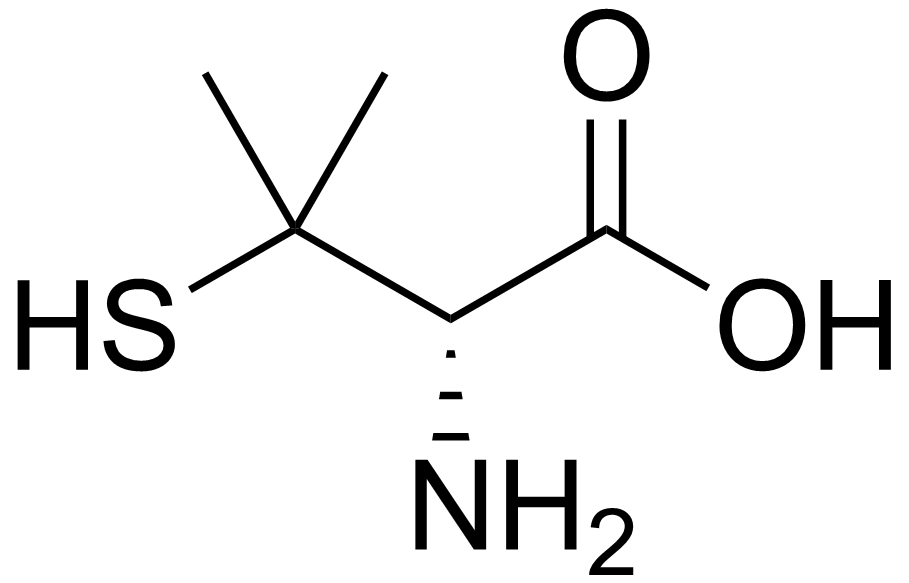
penicillamine

Naturally occurring cyanotoxins can also include non-proteinogenic amino acids. Microcystin and nodularin, for example, are both derived from ADDA, a β-amino acid.

== Taurine ==
Taurine is an amino sulfonic acid and not an amino carboxylic acid, however it is occasionally considered as such as the amounts required to suppress the auxotroph in certain organisms (such as cats) are closer to those of "essential amino acids" (amino acid auxotrophy) than of vitamins (cofactor auxotrophy).

The osmolytes, sarcosine and glycine betaine are derived from amino acids, but have a secondary and quaternary amine respectively.

== See also ==
- Dicarboxylic acid
