= Aspartic alpha-decarboxylase =

Aspartic alpha-decarboxylase may refer to:

- Aspartate 1-decarboxylase, an enzyme
- Glutamate decarboxylase, an enzyme
