= Anabaenopsis =

Scientific classification
- Domain: Bacteria
- Kingdom: Bacillati
- Clade: "Cyanobacteria/Melainabacteria clade"
- Phylum: Cyanobacteria
- Class: Cyanophyceae
- Order: Nostocales
- Family: Aphanizomenonaceae
- Genus: Anabaenopsis; V.V.Miller, 1923

Species
- Anabaenopsis arnoldii var. indica Anabaenopsis arnoldii Anabaenopsis ballygungii Anabaenopsis circularis var. indica Anabaenopsis circularis var. javanica Anabaenopsis circularis Anabaenopsis cuatrecasasii Anabaenopsis cunningtonii Anabaenopsis elenkinii Anabaenopsis hispanica Anabaenopsis hispanica var. luteola Anabaenopsis kulundinensis Anabaenopsis milleri Anabaenopsis nadsonii Anabaenopsis reciborskii Anabaenopsis tanganyikae Anabaenopsis teodorescui

Genus of bacteria

Anabaenopsis is a genus of filamentous, heterocystous cyanobacteria that reproduces by fragmentation and with akinetes. Anabaenopsis can produce microcystins, which are toxic to both humans and animals. The genus is primarily tropical and subtropical, with some species creating blooms in temperate regions during warmer seasons. Anabaenopsis contains bloom-formers among planktonic species.

The type species for the genus is Anabaenopsis elenkinii V.V.Miller, 1923.
