= List of amino acids =

Amino acids are listed by type:

- Proteinogenic amino acid
- Non-proteinogenic amino acids
