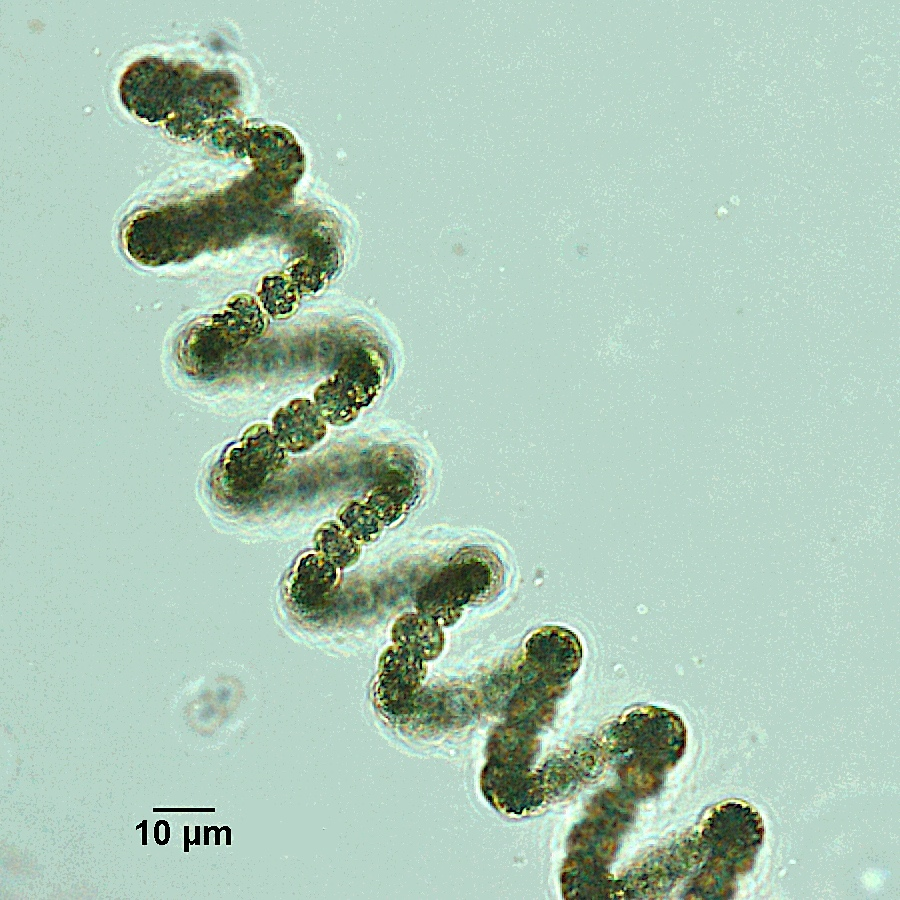
- Dolichospermum

Scientific classification
- Domain: Bacteria
- Kingdom: Bacillati
- Phylum: Cyanobacteriota
- Class: Cyanophyceae
- Order: Nostocales
- Family: Aphanizomenonaceae
- Genus: Dolichospermum (Ralfs ex Bornet & Flahault) P.Wacklin, L.Hoffmann & J.Komárek, 2009

= Dolichospermum =

Genus of bacteria

Dolichospermum is a genus of cyanobacteria belonging to the family Nostocaceae. It was created by splitting from Anabaena using molecular evidence. It is paraphyletic as the author intends: the genera Aphanizomenon and Cuspidothrix, though cladistically included, have "distinct and unique" morphological features that set them apart.

The genus has cosmopolitan distribution.

Many of the morphospecies in Anabaena, Dolichospermum, and Aphanizomenon (ADA clade) are not monophyletic. Work is underway to sequence more genomes from these genera to produce a species classification based on genetic branching.

== Species ==
As accepted by the GBIF:

- Dolichospermum affine (Lemmerm.) P.Wacklin, L.Hoffm. & Komárek
- Dolichospermum berezowskii (Usacev) P.Wacklin et al.
- Dolichospermum circinale (Rabenh. ex Bornet & Flahault) P.Wacklin et al.
- Dolichospermum compactum (Nygaard) Wacklin, L.Hoffm. & Komárek
- Dolichospermum crassum (Lemmerm.) Wacklin, L.Hoffm. & Komárek
- Dolichospermum curvum (H.Hill) Wacklin, L.Hoffm. & Komárek
- Dolichospermum danicum (Nygaard) Wacklin, L.Hoffm. & Komárek
- Dolichospermum delicatulum (Lemmerm.) Wacklin, Hoffmann & Komárek
- Dolichospermum ellipsoides (Boloch. ex Woron.) P.Wacklin et al.
- Dolichospermum farciminiforme (Cronberg & Komárk.-Legn.) Wacklin, L.Hoffm. & Komárek
- Dolichospermum flosaquae (Brébisson ex Bornet & Flahault) P.Wacklin et al.
- Dolichospermum fuscum (H.Hill) Wacklin, L.Hoffm. & Komárek
- Dolichospermum halbfassii (H.Bachm.) P.Wacklin et al.
- Dolichospermum heterosporum (Nygaard) Wacklin, L.Hoffm. & Komárek
- Dolichospermum lemmermannii (P.G.Richt.) Wacklin, L.Hoffm. & Komárek
- Dolichospermum longicellulare (Pankow) Wacklin, Hoffmann & Komárek
- Dolichospermum macrosporum (Kleb.) Wacklin, L.Hoffm. & Komárek
- Dolichospermum mendotae (Trel.) Wacklin, L.Hoffm. & Komárek
- Dolichospermum mucosum (Komárk.-Legn. & Eloranta) Wacklin, L.Hoffm. & Komárek
- Dolichospermum nygaardii (Cronberg & Komárek) Wackl. et al.
- Dolichospermum perturbatum (H.Hill) Wacklin, L.Hoffm. & Komárek
- Dolichospermum planctonicum (Brunnth.) Wacklin, L.Hoffm. & Komárek
- Dolichospermum sigmoideum (Nygaard) Wacklin, L.Hoffm. & Komárek
- Dolichospermum skujaelaxum (Komárek & Zapomelová) P.Wacklin et al.
- Dolichospermum smithii (Komárek) Wacklin, L.Hoffm. & Komárek
- Dolichospermum smithii Thwaites
- Dolichospermum solitarium (Kleb.) Wacklin, L.Hoffm. & Komárek
- Dolichospermum spiroides (Kleb.) Wacklin, L.Hoffm. & Komárek
- Dolichospermum tenericaule (Nygaard) E.Zapomelová, O.Skácelová, P.Pumann, R.Kopp & E.Janecek
- Dolichospermum viguieri (Denis & Frémy) Wacklin, L.Hoffm. & Komárek
- Dolichospermum zinserlingii (Kossinsk.) P.Wacklin et al.
