= Aphanizomenon ovalisporum =

Scientific classification
- Domain: Bacteria
- Kingdom: Bacillati
- Phylum: Cyanobacteriota
- Class: Cyanophyceae
- Order: Nostocales
- Family: Aphanizomenonaceae
- Genus: Aphanizomenon
- Species: A. ovalisporum

Binomial name
- Aphanizomenon ovalisporum Forti, 1912

Species of cyanobacteria

Aphanizomenon ovalisporum is a filamentous cyanobacteria present in many algal blooms.

== Morphology ==
Aphanizomenon ovalisporum is a filamentous gram negative bacterium of the genus Aphanizomenon. The bacterial filaments are unbranched trichomes. The cells are approximately 5 um in diameter, and are motile through gliding. This species produces two differentiated cells, heterocysts, and akinetes.

== Metabolism ==
Aphanizomenon ovalisporum uses oxygenic photosynthesis, like other cyanobacteria. The heterocyst cells of this species can fix nitrogen into ammonium.

== Genome ==
The genome of Aphanizomenon ovalisporum is approximately 7.47 Mbp in size, with a GC content of 50.39%. There are 2851 coding sequences. The strain analyzed was isolated in Madrid, Spain.

== Environment ==
The species was first described during an algal bloom in Lake Kinneret, Israel, 1994. However, other isolates have been obtained from countries around Europe, such as Spain. The most recent samples were taken from a man-made lake in Madrid. This cyanobacterial species can rapidly change its environment during algal blooms, in which it produces toxins such as cylindrospermopsin, which can cause headaches, vomiting and other symptoms in humans, as well as leading to the deoxygenation of the local water.
