= Pansteatitis =

- Specialty: Nutrition, veterinary medicine

Pansteatitis, or yellow fat disease, is a physiological condition in which the body fat becomes inflamed.

== Presentations ==
The condition has been found in cats, fish, herons, terrapins and Nile crocodiles, piscivores such as otters, cormorants, Pel's fishing-owls and fish eagles. The disorder is also regularly found in captive-bred animals fed on high fish diets, such as mink, pigs and poultry. It shows as a rubber-like hardening of fat reserves which then become unavailable for normal metabolism, resulting in extreme pain, loss of mobility and death.

== Causes ==
It is thought to be brought about by any or a combination of a number of factors which include:

- Vitamin E deficiency
- Microcystin and nodularin poisoning, via inhibition of protein phosphatases
- Heavy metals and other fat-accumulated pollutants such as DDT, PCBs, PCDDs and brominated flame retardants
- Ingestion of affected animals
- Pathogens as yet unidentified

== Incidents ==
In 2008 about 170 crocodile deaths in the Olifants Gorge on the Olifants, and in the Letaba Rivers in the eastern part of the Kruger National Park in South Africa, alerted rangers and researchers to a problem that may eventually reach epidemic proportions. Dead and dying bottom-feeding catfish Clarias gariepinus that had ingested toxic pollutants such as heavy metals, had become an easy source of food for the crocodiles, with a resulting transfer of the toxins. With the onset of winter and lower temperatures, metabolism switches to fat reserves, at which time mortality peaks. These particular toxins are from the upper reaches of the river, originating from the industrial and mining complex in the Witbank and Middelburg area. Earlier, in 2007, at the Loskop Dam, higher in the Olifants River, crocodile deaths were linked to a mass die-off of fish after sewage pollution caused cyanobacterial blooms. The affected crocodiles had consumed masses of dead and dying fish. Cyanobacterial blooms (Anabaena spp.) are common in the stagnant water of dams, but do not occur in the flowing water of rivers. High autumnal mortality among migratory herons and caused by cyanobacterial blooms, is seen regularly in brackish impoundments at Chesapeake Bay in the United States.

The Massingir Dam in Mozambique, and just downstream of the Olifants Gorge, was constructed in the 1970s, but the country's civil war delayed installation of the sluice gates. The dam wall was raised and sluice gates installed in 2006, causing sediment to back up into the 8 km-long Olifants Gorge.

== See also ==
- Vitamin E deficiency
