= S-Aminoethyl-L-cysteine =

S-Aminoethyl-l-cysteine
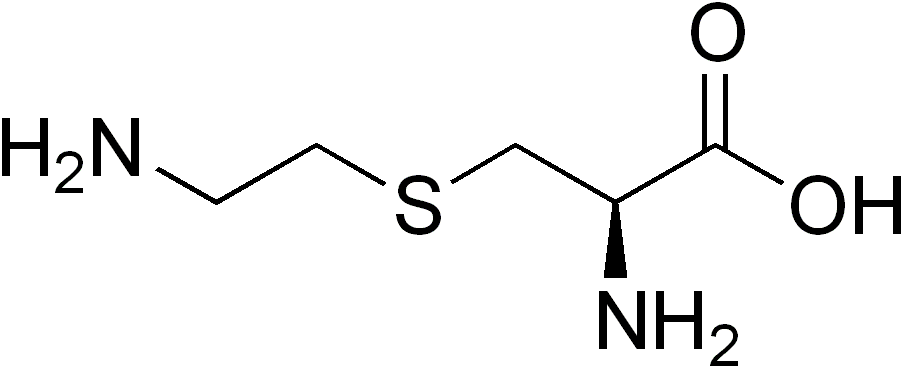
- Skeletal formula

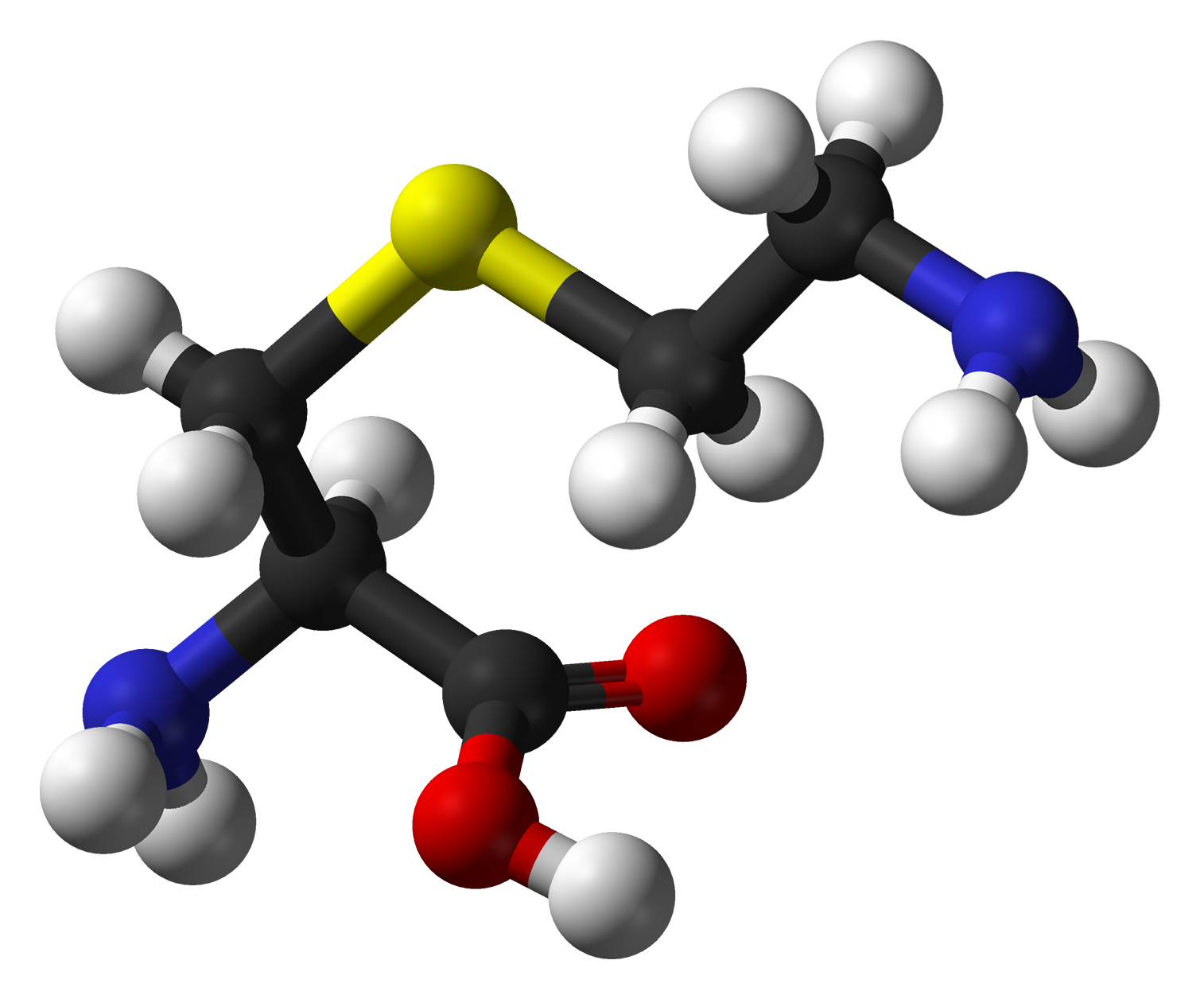
- Ball-and-stick model

Names
- IUPAC name S-(2-Aminoethyl)-L-cysteine
- Systematic IUPAC name (2R)-2-Amino-3-[(2-aminoethyl)sulfanyl]propanoic acid
- Other names Thialysine; L-3-[(2-Aminoethyl)thio]alanine; L-4-Thialysine; Thiosine

Identifiers
CAS Number	2936-69-8; 4099-35-8 (HCl)
3D model (JSmol)	Interactive image
ChEBI	CHEBI:497734
ChEMBL	ChEMBL397565
ChemSpider	89945
PubChem CID	99558
UNII	OS2H9OH0GT; WPH5RH5BID (HCl)
CompTox Dashboard (EPA)	DTXSID40183588
- InChI: InChI=1S/C5H12N2O2S/c6-1-2-10-3-4(7)5(8)9/h4H,1-3,6-7H2,(H,8,9)/t4-/m0/s1 Key: GHSJKUNUIHUPDF-BYPYZUCNSA-N; InChI=1/C5H12N2O2S/c6-1-2-10-3-4(7)5(8)9/h4H,1-3,6-7H2,(H,8,9)/t4-/m0/s1 Key: GHSJKUNUIHUPDF-BYPYZUCNBP
- SMILES: OC([C@@H](N)CSCCN)=O

Properties
Chemical formula	C_{5}H_{12}N_{2}O_{2}S
Molar mass	164.22 g·mol^{−1}
- Except where otherwise noted, data are given for materials in their standard state (at 25 °C [77 °F], 100 kPa). verify (what is ?) Infobox references

S-Aminoethyl-l-cysteine, also known as thialysine, is a toxic analog of the amino acid lysine in which the second carbon of the amino acid's R-group (side chain) has been replaced with a sulfur atom.

Strictly speaking, L-thialysine is actually considered an S-(2-aminoethyl) analogue of L-cysteine. This compound is known to have cytotoxic affects as it inhibits protein synthesis and lysine 2,3-aminomutase.
