= Microcystinase =

Microcystinase is a protease that selectively degrades microcystin, an extremely potent cyanotoxin that causes marine pollution and can lead to human and animal food chain poisoning. The enzyme is naturally produced by a number of bacteria isolated in Japan and New Zealand. As of 2012, the chemical structure of this enzyme has not been scientifically determined.

The enzyme degrades the cyclic peptide toxin microcystin into a linear peptide, which is 160 times less toxic. Other bacteria then further degrade the linear peptide.
