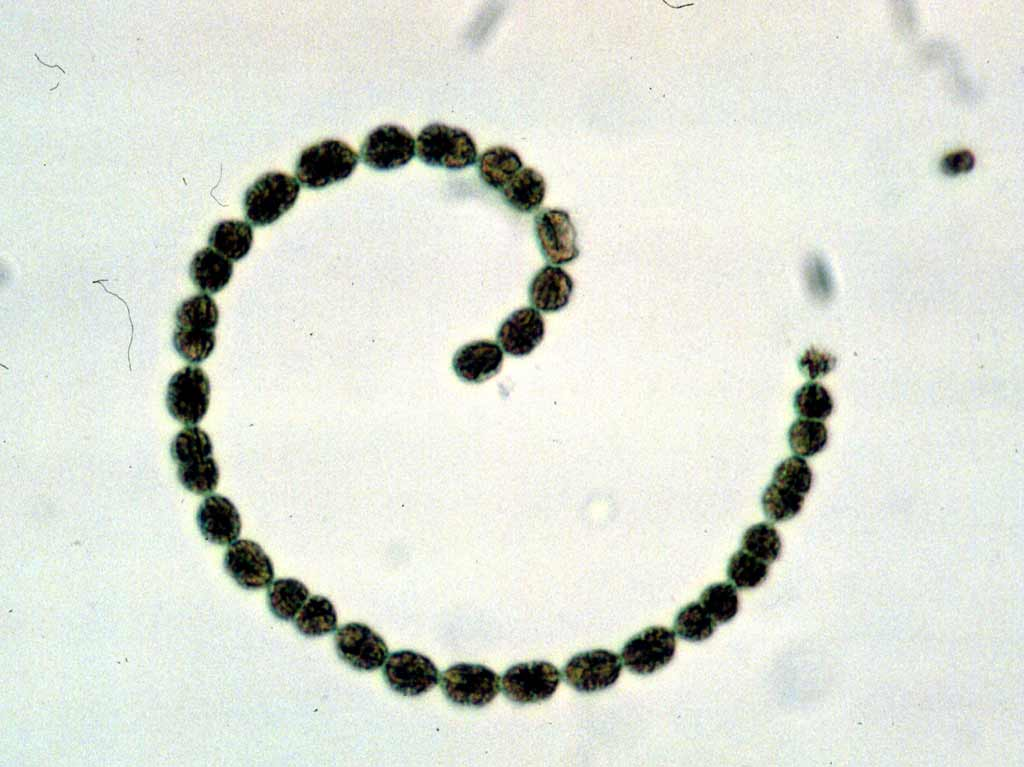

Scientific classification
- Domain: Bacteria
- Kingdom: Bacillati
- Clade: "Cyanobacteria/Melainabacteria clade"
- Phylum: Cyanobacteria
- Class: Cyanophyceae
- Order: Nostocales
- Family: Aphanizomenonaceae
- Genus: Dolichospermum
- Species: D. flos-aquae

Binomial name
- Dolichospermum flos-aquae (Brébisson ex Bornet & Flahault) P.Wacklin, L.Hoffmann & J.Komárek, 2009

Synonyms
- Anabaena flos-aquae Brébisson ex Bornet et flaHault 1888

= Dolichospermum flos-aquae =

Species of bacterium

Dolichospermum flos-aquae is a species of cyanobacteria belonging to the family Aphanizomenonaceae.

Type locality: Sweden, Denmark, Scotland, France, Germany, USA.

== Taxonomy ==
It was originally described as Anabaena flos-aquae. Dolichospermum was created in 2009, bringing in a well-defined group from Anabaena. The similarly-named Aphanizomenon flos-aquae falls into the clade, but was not renamed.

== Genomes ==
As of 2025, 4 genomes of D. flos-aquae are available on NCBI.

As of 2025 (Release 10-RS226), GTDB's genome-based taxonomy assigns the genomes sequenced as D. flos-aquae as:

- Dolichospermum flos-aquae LEGE 04289, assigned to Dolichospermum planctonicum
- Dolichospermum flos-aquae CCAP 1403/13F, assigned to Dolichospermum lemmermannii as species-representative
- Dolichospermum flos-aquae UHCC 0037, assigned to Dolichospermum heterosporum.
