= Microcystin-LR =

Names
- IUPAC name (5R,8S,11R,12S,15S,18S,19S,22R)-15-[3-(diaminomethylideneamino)propyl]-18-[(1E,3E,5S,6S)-6-Methoxy-3,5-dimethyl-7-phenylhepta-1,3-dienyl]-1,5,12,19-tetramethyl-2-methylidene-8-(2-methylpropyl)-3,6,9,13,16,20,25-heptaoxo-1,4,7,10,14,17,21-heptazacyclopentacosane-11,22-dicarboxylic acid
- Other names 5-L-Arginine-microcystin LA

Identifiers
CAS Number	101043-37-2
3D model (JSmol)	Interactive image
Abbreviations	MC-LR, MCYST-LR
ChEBI	CHEBI:6925
ChEMBL	ChEMBL444092
ChemSpider	4941647
ECHA InfoCard	100.150.186
EC Number	621-323-9
IUPHAR/BPS	4735
KEGG	C05371
PubChem CID	24896778
UNII	EQ8332842Y
CompTox Dashboard (EPA)	DTXSID3031654
- InChI: InChI=1S/C49H74N10O12/c1-26(2)23-37-46(66)58-40(48(69)70)30(6)42(62)55-35(17-14-22-52-49(50)51)45(65)54-34(19-18-27(3)24-28(4)38(71-10)25-33-15-12-11-13-16-33)29(5)41(61)56-36(47(67)68)20-21-39(60)59(9)32(8)44(64)53-31(7)43(63)57-37/h11-13,15-16,18-19,24,26,28-31,34-38,40H,8,14,17,20-23,25H2,1-7,9-10H3,(H,53,64)(H,54,65)(H,55,62)(H,56,61)(H,57,63)(H,58,66)(H,67,68)(H,69,70)(H4,50,51,52)/b19-18+,27-24+/t28-,29-,30-,31+,34-,35-,36+,37+,38-,40+/m0/s1 Key: ZYZCGGRZINLQBL-JCGNTXOTSA-N; InChI=1S/C49H74N10O12/c1-26(2)23-37-46(66)58-40(48(69)70)30(6)42(62)55-35(17-14-22-52-49(50)51)45(65)54-34(19-18-27(3)24-28(4)38(71-10)25-33-15-12-11-13-16-33)29(5)41(61)56-36(47(67)68)20-21-39(60)59(9)32(8)44(64)53-31(7)43(63)57-37/h11-13,15-16,18-19,24,26,28-31,34-38,40H,8,14,17,20-23,25H2,1-7,9-10H3,(H,53,64)(H,54,65)(H,55,62)(H,56,61)(H,57,63)(H,58,66)(H,67,68)(H,69,70)(H4,50,51,52)/b19-18+,27-24+/t28-,29-,30-,31+,34-,35-,36+,37-,38-,40+/m0/s1
- SMILES: CC(/C=C/[C@@H]1NC([C@@H](NC([C@H]([C@@H](NC([C@@H](NC([C@H](NC(C(N(C(CC[C@@H](NC([C@H]1C)=O)C(O)=O)=O)C)=C)=O)C)=O)CC(C)C)=O)C(O)=O)C)=O)CCCNC(N)=N)=O)=C\[C@H](C)[C@H](CC2=CC=CC=C2)OC

Properties
Chemical formula	C_{49}H_{74}N_{10}O_{12}
Molar mass	995.189 g·mol^{−1}
Appearance	White solid
Density	1.299 g/cm^{3}
Solubility in ethanol	1 mg/mL
log P	−1.44

Pharmacology
Routes of administration	Ingestion

Hazards
- Occupational safety and health (OHS/OSH)
Main hazards	extremely toxic
- GHS labelling
Pictograms	(GHS06: Toxic)
Signal word	Danger
Hazard statements	H300, H310, H315, H317, H319, H335
- Lethal dose or concentration (LD, LC)
LD_{50} (median dose)	5 mg/kg
- Except where otherwise noted, data are given for materials in their standard state (at 25 °C [77 °F], 100 kPa). verify (what is ?) Infobox references

Microcystin-LR (MC-LR) is a toxin produced by cyanobacteria. It is the most toxic of the microcystins.

== Structure ==
Microcystins are cyclic heptapeptides. The seven amino acids that are involved in the structure of a microcystin include the unique amino acids ADDA and D-β-methyl-isoaspartate (D-β-Me-isoAsp). Furthermore, microcystins contain two variable residues, which make the differentiation between variants of microcystins. These two variable functionalities are always standard proteinogenic amino acids - In microcystin-LR these are leucine and arginine.

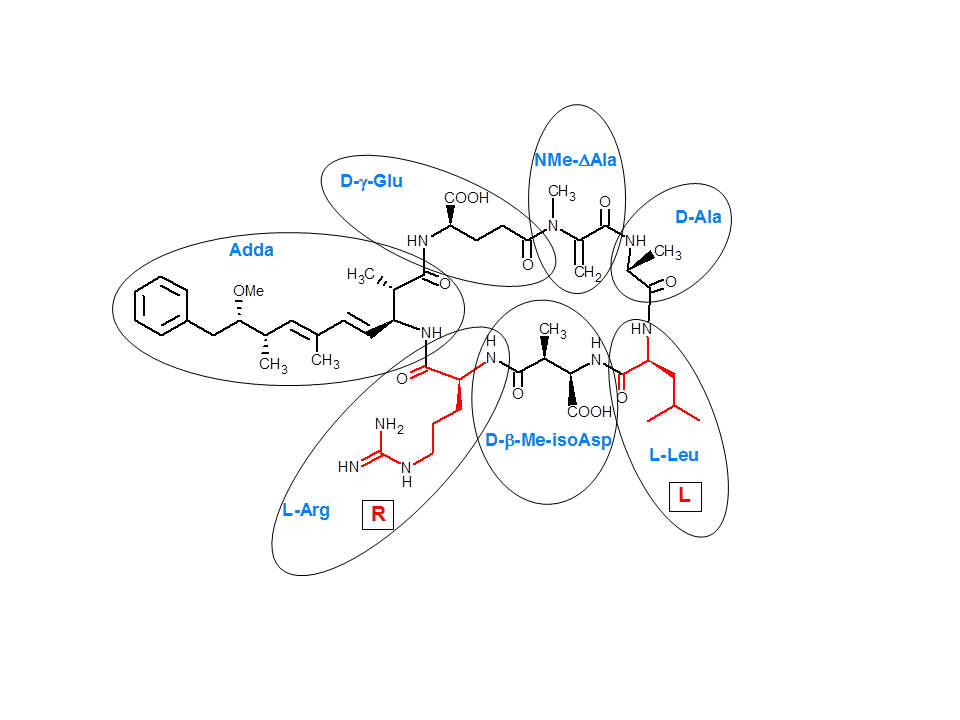
The chemical composition of microcystin-LR, id made up of 7 amino acids

More than 250 microcystins have been identified to date, representing differences in the two variable residues and some modifications in the other amino acids. These modifications include demethylation of Masp and Mdha and methylesterification of D-Glu. Different microcystins have different toxicity profiles, with microcystin-LR found to be the most toxic.

== Biosynthesis ==
Microcystins are small nonribosomal peptides. In Microcystis aeruginosa microcystin-LR is synthesized by proteins that encoded by a 55 kb microcystin-gene cluster (mcy) that contains 6 large (over 3 kb) genes that encode proteins with polyketide synthase activity, nonribosomal peptide synthase activity (mcyA-E and G) and 4 smaller genes (mcyF and H-J). These large proteins are made up of different protein domains, coined 'modules', that each have their own specific enzymatic function. Although the enzyme systems involved in the biosynthesis of microcystins is not identical among all cyanobacteria, there are large similarities and most of the essential enzymes are conserved.

The biosynthesis of microcystin-LR in Microcystis aeruginosa begins with the coupling of phenylacetate to the mcyG enzyme. In a series of reactions, catalysed by different enzyme modules as well as different enzymes, microcystin-LR is formed. The entire biosynthesis pathway of microcystin-LR in Microcystis aeruginosa is illustrated in the figure.

The biosynthesis of microcystin-LR by Microcystis aeruginosa.

The first steps of the synthesis involve the insertion of several carbon- and oxygen atoms between the acetyl- and phenylgroup. This part of the synthesis is catalyzed by enzyme domains that possess β-ketoacylsynthase, acyltransferase, C-methyltransferase and ketoacyl reductase activity. At the end of this stage, that is, after the first condensation of glutamate, the amino acid Adda is formed. The second part of the synthesis involves the condensation of the amino acids of which the microcystin is composed. Thus, in the case of microcystin-LR the consecutive condensation of the amino acids glutamic acid, methyldehydroalanine, alanine, leucine, methylaspartic acid and arginine leads to the coupled product. A nucleophilic attack of the nitrogen in the Adda residue results in the release of the cyclic microcystin-LR.

The different microcystins are all synthesized by the same enzymes as microcystin-LR.

== Mechanism of toxicity ==
Microcystin-LR inhibits protein phosphatase type 1 and type 2A (PP1 and PP2A) activities in the cytoplasm of liver cells. This leads to an increase in phosphorylation of proteins in liver cells. The interaction of microcystin-LR to the phosphatases includes the formation of a covalent bond between a methylene group of microcystin-LR and a cystine residue at the catalytic subunit of the phosphoprotein phosphatase (PPP) family of serine/threonine-specific phosphatases, like PP1 and PP2A. When microcystin-LR binds directly to the catalytic center of the PPP enzymes, they block the access of the substrate to the active site completely and inhibition of the enzyme takes place. In this way the protein phosphatase is inhibited and more phosphorylated proteins in the liver cells are left, which is responsible for the hepatotoxicity of microcystin-LR.

The active site of catalytic PPP enzymes represents three surface grooves: the hydrophobic groove, the acidic groove and the C-terminal groove, which are Y-shaped with the active site at the bifurcation point. The Adda side-chain of microcystin-LR is accommodated to the hydrophobic groove, the carboxylic D-Glu site makes hydrogen bonds to metal-bound water molecules and the carboxyl group of the Masp site makes hydrogen bonds to conserved arginine and tyrosine residues in the PPP enzyme. Finally the methylene group at the Mdha site of microcystin-LR binds covalently to a S-atom of a cysteine residue, and the leucine residue packs closely to another conserved tyrosine residue.

== Effects ==
Microcystin-LR is toxic for both humans and animals. There are epidemiological results from studies that have shown symptoms of poisoning attributed to the presence of cyanotoxins in drinking water. The effects are divided in short-term and long-term effects.

=== Human poisonings ===
There are no verifiable reports of human deaths known to have been specifically caused by microcystin-LR, although there are reports of health effects after exposure and there have been deaths attributed to microcystins in general. One of the most outstanding reports was an outbreak in Caruaru, Brazil, in 1996. 116 patients experienced multiple effects: visual disturbance, nausea, vomiting and muscle weakness. One hundred developed acute liver failure and 52 suffered from symptoms of what is now called "Caruaru Syndrome." The syndrome was caused by dialysis therapy with water that had not been properly treated.

==== Short-term effects ====
There are few short-term effects caused by exposure to microcystin-LR. Microcystins are primarily hepatotoxic compounds; therefore, noticeable toxic effects are not immediate. Most of the toxicity studies have been done with mice that received intra-peritoneal injections. The most common effect is liver damage, Two of the most commonly seen symptoms are gastroenteritis and cholestatic liver disease.

In an experiment with mice, the animals died within a few hours after injection of a lethal dose of micocystin-LR. Liver damage could be noticed in 20 minutes. Within a few hours, liver cells died.

==== Long-term effects ====
Acute microcystin-LR intoxication may result in long-term injury, while chronic low-level exposure may cause adverse health effects. From animal studies, it is proven that there will be chronic liver injury from oral exposure to microcystin-LR. It might even be carcinogenic. Cancers have been found during animal studies. Microcystin-LR itself does not cause cancer, but it may stimulate the growth of cancer cells.

=== Animal effects ===
Microcystin-LR had effects on all animals, not only the domestic animals from swimming in a river of drinking water with cyanobacteria blooms. Symptoms in domestic animal poisoning include diarrhea, vomiting, weakness, recumbency and are fatal in most cases

Mircocystin-LR is toxic for all animals, including the animals consumed by humans. Fishes and birds are also at risk for microcystin-LR poisoning.

== Exposure Routes ==
Cyanobacteria prefer to live in water bodies such as lake, ponds, reservoirs, and slow-moving streams. When the water is warm there are enough nutrients available for the bacteria to survive. Most cyanobacteria produce toxins, of which microcystin is only one group. When a cyanobacterium dies, its cell wall degrades while the toxins are released in the water. Microcystins are extremely stable in water and withstand chemical breakdown such as hydrolysis or oxidation. The half-life of this toxin is 3 weeks at pH 1 and 40 °C. At typical conditions in the environment, however, the half-life is 10 weeks. Microcystin-LR water contamination is resistant to boiling and microwave treatments.

After release in the water, microcystins are actively absorbed by fish and birds from intoxicated water and thus enter the food chain. Humans are also exposed to microcystins by performing activities in intoxicated water.

== Disposition and metabolism ==
=== Disposition ===
Microcystin-LR is rapidly excreted from the blood plasma. Plasma half-lives for the α- and β-stages, corresponding to distribution and elimination, are respectively 0.8 and 6.9 minutes. The total clearance of the compound from the plasma is about 0.9 mL/min. The excretion of the compound takes primarily place via the feces and urine. After 6 days approximately 24% of the intake is excreted from the body, of which about 9% is excreted via the feces and 14.5% via the urine.

Microcystin-LR is mostly concentrated in the liver. Other tissues get exposed at much lower levels.

=== Metabolism ===
Data about the metabolism of microcystin-LR in humans is very scarce. Data about metabolism and disposition of the toxin in mice and rats is more widely available. In these animals microcystin-LR is rapidly concentrated in the liver. Intoxication of mice with microcystin-LR led to a decrease in the levels of cytochrome P450 and cytochrome b5 and an increase in cytochrome P420, to which CYP450 is converted. Together with the fact that mice with an induced higher concentration CYP450 are less affected by the toxin, this suggest that CYP450 plays an important role in the detoxification of the compound.

In phase 2 of the biotransformation the compound is conjugated with several different endogenous substances. Microcystin-LR is known to be excreted as glutathione conjugate, cysteine conjugate and an oxidized ADDA diene conjugate. The glutathione and cysteine conjugate with the Mda-moiety. The oxidized ADDA is conjugated at the conjugated bond.

== Toxicity ==
Toxic effects cyanotoxins are very diverse and include neurotoxicity, hepatotoxicity and cytotoxicity with chemical burns. Microcystins are generally associated with hepatotoxicity. The toxic effect of microcystins is due to their inhibition of protein phosphatases.

=== Acute subacute toxicity ===
Many studies took place with intraperitoneal administration. Because of the differences in lipophilicity and polarity between the different microcystins, it cannot be presumed that the i.p. LD_{50} will predict toxicity after oral administration.

Microcystins are hepatotoxins. After acute exposure, severe liver damage is noticeable by a disruption of liver cell structure. The liver weight will increase due to intrahepatic hemorrhage, haemodynamic shock, heart failure and death.

After nasal administration of microcystin-LR, the epithelium of nasal mucosa of both the olfactory and respiratory zones were suffering from necrosis. Even liver lesions were noticed after oral administration. The LD_{50} for nasal administration is equal to the intraperitoneal administration.

=== Repeated oral administration ===
For the assessment of possible chronic human health effects, studies involving repeated oral administration of pure microcystins at various dose levels are most desirable. In a mice study, pure mirocystin-LR was administered orally at doses 0, 40, 200 or 1000 μg/kg bodyweight. At the highest dose, almost all mice showed liver changes and chronic inflammation and a few other symptoms. In female mice only changes in transaminases were observed at the highest dose.

=== Carcinogenicity ===
==== Microcystin alone ====
Mice showed neoplastic liver nodules after 100 oral administrations at 20 μg/kg bodyweight. The nodules observed were up to 5mm in diameter. However, no mice showed liver nodules after 100 administrations of 80 μg/kg.

==== Interaction with tumors ====
The IARC committee concluded that microcystin-LR is possibly carcinogenic to humans. So, microcystin-LR itself is not a carcinogen, but it stimulates tumor growth. Mice treated with the carcinogenic compound dimethylbenzathracene showed an increased number and weight of skin tumors.

=== In vivo animal experiments ===
There is very little known about acute toxicity for humans, but there have been animal studies, showing the following results.

Method of administration	Toxicity	Species	Value
Oral	LD_{50}	Mouse	5 mg/kg
Inhalation, 10h	LC_{50}	Mouse	18 mg/kg
Intraperitoneal	LC_{50}	Rat	0.05 mg/kg
Intraperitoneal	LC_{50}	Mouse	0.0325 mg/kg
Intravenous	LC_{50}	Mouse	0.06 mg/kg

When microcystins are injected intravenously or intraperitoneally, they localize in the liver. This appears to be the result of uptake by hepatocytes. The WHO report states that microcystins are lethal to mice when they are exposed intraperitoneally to 25 to 150 μg/kg body weight. Perhaps due to poor absorption after exposure, orally administered microscytins are less toxic, as a lethal dose in mice is about 5 to 10 μg/kg body weight. Hepatotoxicity in the form of hepatic necrosis occurs within 60 minutes after an intravenous dose. Blooms of Microcystis aeruginosa did not cause increased tumor rates in groups of mice treated for up to one year. It is shown that mice given 20 μg/kg body weight 4 times a week during a period of 28 weeks developed neoplasms of the liver. There results are, however, ambiguous. By the oral route, microcystin-LR displays acute toxicity in rodents. It is apparent that a significant amount of the oral dose passes the intestinal barrier.

=== Developmental effects ===
Microcystins do not appear to show developmental toxicity.

=== Genotoxicity ===
The WHO states microcystin-LR has no mutagenic effect. However, the induction of DNA strand-breaks in lymphocytes has been observed in mice after single oral administration. The effect is time- and dose-dependent. There is no change in the expression of selected genes involved in the cellular response to DNA damage after a 4-hour exposure. After 24 hours, the DNA damage-responsive genes were upregulated, which indicates that microcystin-LR is an indirect genotoxic agent. In China, the highest incidence of liver cancer occurs in areas with abundant cyanobacteria in the surface waters. Tumor development is associated with low-concentration exposure over a long period of time.

=== In vitro studies ===
In vitro studies showed that microcystin-LR is a potent inhibitor of protein phosphatase 1 (PP-1) and PP2A, but has no effect on protein kinase C or cyclic AMP-dependent kinase. Mutagenicity does not appear to occur for purified toxins derived from Microcystis, although the toxins were clastogenic for human lymphocytes.

== Biodegradation ==
A metalloprotease enzyme isolated from bacteria at Lake Rotorua, among other locations, is called microcystinase. This particular enzyme turns microcystins into products with a 160-fold decrease in toxicity.

== History ==
The Chinese general Zhu-Ge Liang was the first to observe cyanobacteria poisoning about 1000 years ago. He reported the death of troops who drank green coloured water from a river in southern China. The first published report of an incidence of cyanobacteria poisoning dates from the poisoning of an Australian lake in 1878. Also, in China and Brasil, people died after drinking water from a lake. All these incidents have been attributed to cyanobacteria and the toxic compound microcystin-LR. That is the reason why the World Health Organization (WHO) issued a guideline for microcystins in drinking water. The WHO guideline for microcystins in drinking water, based on microcystin-LR, is 1 μg/L. With the high levels of Eutrophication in South Africa, typical exposures can be as high as 10 μg/L.
