= ADDA (amino acid) =

Amino acid in toxins made by cyanobacteria

Names
- Preferred IUPAC name (2S,3S,4E,6E,8S,9S)-3-Amino-9-methoxy-2,6,8-trimethyl-10-phenyldeca-4,6-dienoic acid
- Other names (all-S,all-E)-3-Amino-9-methoxy-2,6,8-trimethyl-10-phenyldeca-4,6-dienoic acid

Identifiers
CAS Number	126456-06-2
3D model (JSmol)	Interactive image
ChemSpider	20137047
PubChem CID	14205264
UNII	VKL2NS279Z
- InChI: InChI=1S/C20H29NO3/c1-14(10-11-18(21)16(3)20(22)23)12-15(2)19(24-4)13-17-8-6-5-7-9-17/h5-12,15-16,18-19H,13,21H2,1-4H3,(H,22,23)/b11-10+,14-12+/t15-,16-,18-,19-/m0/s1 Key: HJVCHYDYCYBBQX-HLTLHRPFSA-N; InChI=1/C20H29NO3/c1-14(10-11-18(21)16(3)20(22)23)12-15(2)19(24-4)13-17-8-6-5-7-9-17/h5-12,15-16,18-19H,13,21H2,1-4H3,(H,22,23)/b11-10+,14-12+/t15-,16-,18-,19-/m0/s1 Key: HJVCHYDYCYBBQX-HLTLHRPFBY
- SMILES: OC([C@@H](C)[C@@H](N)/C=C/C(C)=C/[C@H](C)[C@@H](OC)CC1=CC=CC=C1)=O

Properties
Chemical formula	C_{20}H_{29}NO_{3}
Molar mass	331.456 g·mol^{−1}
- Except where otherwise noted, data are given for materials in their standard state (at 25 °C [77 °F], 100 kPa). Infobox references

ADDA ((all-S,all-E)-3-amino-9-methoxy-2,6,8-trimethyl-10-phenyldeca-4,6-dienoic acid) is a non-proteinogenic amino acid found in toxins made by cyanobacteria. Toxins which include this amino acid include microcystins and nodularins.

Along with leucine and arginine, it is found in microcystin-LR, an extremely toxic compound produced by cyanobacteria. In order to treat a water supply contaminated with microcystin-LR, chlorination can be used to oxidize the double bonds of ADDA in order to initiate the chemical breakdown of this compound.
