= Nodularin =

Nodularin-R

Names
- Other names Cyclo[(2S,3S,4E,6E,8S,9S)-3-amino-9-methoxy-2,6,8-trimethyl-10-phenyl-4,6-decadienoyl-D-γ-glutamyl-(2Z)-2-(methylamino)-2-butenoyl-(3S)-3-methyl-D-β-aspartyl-L-arginyl]

Identifiers
CAS Number	118399-22-7
3D model (JSmol)	Interactive image
ChEBI	CHEBI:80043
ChEMBL	ChEMBL108308
ChemSpider	10471625
EC Number	621-437-9
KEGG	C15713
PubChem CID	14217092
UNII	0979BIK2QU
CompTox Dashboard (EPA)	DTXSID60880022
- InChI: InChI=1S/C41H60N8O10/c1-8-31-38(54)48-34(40(57)58)26(5)36(52)46-29(15-12-20-44-41(42)43)37(53)45-28(25(4)35(51)47-30(39(55)56)18-19-33(50)49(31)6)17-16-23(2)21-24(3)32(59-7)22-27-13-10-9-11-14-27/h8-11,13-14,16-17,21,24-26,28-30,32,34H,12,15,18-20,22H2,1-7H3,(H,45,53)(H,46,52)(H,47,51)(H,48,54)(H,55,56)(H,57,58)(H4,42,43,44)/b17-16+,23-21+,31-8-/t24-,25-,26-,28-,29-,30+,32-,34+/m0/s1 Key: IXBQSRWSVIBXNC-HSKGSTCASA-N
- SMILES: C/C=C\1/C(=O)N[C@H]([C@@H](C(=O)N[C@H](C(=O)N[C@H]([C@@H](C(=O)N[C@H](CCC(=O)N1C)C(=O)O)C)/C=C/C(=C/[C@H](C)[C@H](CC2=CC=CC=C2)OC)/C)CCCNC(=N)N)C)C(=O)O

Properties
Chemical formula	C_{41}H_{60}N_{8}O_{10}
Molar mass	824.977 g·mol^{−1}

Hazards
- GHS labelling
Pictograms	(GHS06: Toxic) (GHS07: Exclamation mark)
Signal word	Danger
Hazard statements	H300, H310, H315, H317, H319, H330, H335
Precautionary statements	P260, P262, P264, P270, P271, P272, P280, P284, P301+P310, P302+P350, P302+P352, P304+P340, P305+P351+P338, P310, P312, P320, P321, P330, P332+P313, P333+P313, P337+P313, P361, P362, P363, P403+P233, P405, P501
- Except where otherwise noted, data are given for materials in their standard state (at 25 °C [77 °F], 100 kPa). verify (what is ?) Infobox references

Nodularins are potent toxins produced by the cyanobacterium Nodularia spumigena, among others. This aquatic, photosynthetic cyanobacterium forms visible colonies that present as algal blooms in brackish water bodies throughout the world. The late summer blooms of Nodularia spumigena are among the largest cyanobacterial mass occurrences in the world. Cyanobacteria synthesize many toxic substances, most notably microcystins and nodularins: the two are not easily differentiated. A significant homology of structure and function exists between the two, and microcystins have been studied in greater detail. Because of this, facts from microcystins are often extended to nodularins.

Nodularin-R is the predominant toxin variant, though 10 variants of nodularin have been discovered to date. Nodularins are cyclic nonribosomal pentapeptides and contain several unusual non-proteinogenic amino acids such as N-methyl-didehydroaminobutyric acid and the β-amino acid ADDA. These compounds are relatively stable compounds: light, temperature, and microwaves do little to degrade the compounds.

Nodularins are often attributed to gastroenteritis, allergic irritation reactions, and liver diseases. Nodularin-R is most notorious as a potent hepatotoxin that may cause serious damage to the liver of humans and other animals. The WHO drinking water concentration limit for nodularins (extended from microcystins-LR) is 1.5 ug /L.

== Physiochemical properties ==
Nodularin-R has a molecular formula C_{41}H_{60}N_{8}O_{10} and average molecular weight of 824.963 g/mol. The compound has 8 defined stereocenters. It is a solid substance. In methanol, nodularin is soluble 2 mg/mL. It breaks down slowly at temperatures greater than 104 °F (40 °C), pH less than 1 and pH greater than 9. Nodularins are typically resistant to breakdown via hydrolysis and oxidation in aquatic conditions. Hazardous decomposition products of nodularins are carbon monoxide and carbon dioxide.

The basic framework for nodularin structure is D-Masp^{1}-Z^{2}-Adda^{3}-D-γ-Glu^{4}-Mdhb^{5}, where Z is a variable amino acid; the systematic name "nodularin-Z" (NOD-Z in short) is then assigned based on the one letter code (if available; longer code otherwise) of the amino acid. For the common NOD-R, the Z amino acid is arginine.

== Mechanism of action ==
=== Metabolism ===
Nodularin primarily targets the liver, though nodularins also accumulate in the blood, intestines, and kidneys. In the liver, this targeting leads to cytoskeletal damage, necrosis, and rapid blistering of the hepatocytes. Cell death and rapid blistering also destroys the finer blood vessels of the liver. The damage results in blood pooling in the liver, which can lead to an increase in liver weight of 100%. Death by nodularin poisoning occurs from this hemorrhagic shock. This is fast acting, and occurs within a few hours after a high dose.

At the molecular level and in further detail, nodularin is processed in a complex manner to induce toxic effects. During digestion, nodularins diffuse from small intestine into liver due to active uptake by an unspecific organic anion transporter in the bile acid carrier transport system. This transporter is expressed in the gastrointestinal tract, kidney, brain, and liver. Once in the liver, nodularin inhibits three key enzymes, specifically the catalytic units of serine/threonine protein phosphatases: protein phosphatase 1 (PP-1) and protein phosphatase 2A. (PP-2A), and protein phosphatase 3 (PP-3). These enzymes act by removing the phosphate from a protein, inhibiting the function of the protein.

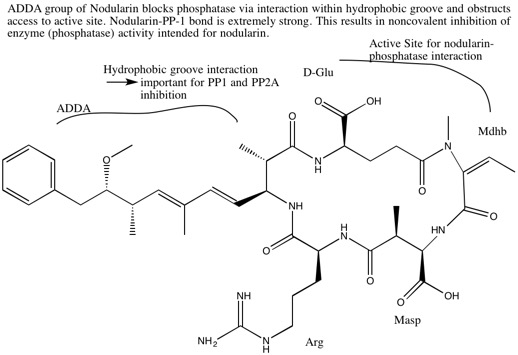
Emphasised on nodularin are the key sites for interaction with protein phosphatase, which leads to inhibition of the enzyme.

An initial noncovalent interaction involving the ADDA side chain (specifically where ADDA has a 6E double bond) of the nodularin and a free D-glutamyl carboxyl group off a cyclic structure of the phosphatase is the source of toxicity. The ADDA group blocks enzyme (phosphatase) activity by interacting with hydrophobic groove and obstructing substrate access to active site cleft. The toxin-phosphatase bond interactions (nodularin-PP-1, nodularin-PP-2A) are extremely strong. This leads to inhibition of the enzyme activity. Of note, nodularins differ from microcystins here: nodularins bind noncovalently to protein phosphatases while microcystins bind covalently.

A further interaction involves a Michael-addition covalent linkage of electrophilic α, β unsaturated carbonyl of a methyldehydroalanine residue on the nodularin to a thiol of cysteine 273 on PP-1. Though the covalent bond in step 2 is not essential for inhibition of enzyme activity, it does help mediate activity. Without this covalent bond, there is over a 10-fold reduction of nodularin affinity for the phosphatase. The inhibition of the protein phosphatases results in increased phosphorylation of cytoskeletal proteins and cytoskeletal associated proteins. The hyperphosphorylation of intermediate filaments of the cell, specifically of cytokeratin 8 and cytokeratin 18, is the main cause for protein imbalance. The protein imbalance stimulates redistribution and rearrangement of these proteins, which changes the whole cell morphology and membrane integrity. More specifically, this redistribution leads to collapse of actin microfilaments in the hepatocyte cytoskeleton and dislocation of a-actinin and talin. Contact with neighboring cells is reduced and sinusoidal capillaries lose stability which rapidly leads to intrahepatic hemorrhage and often results in serious liver malfunction or death.

=== Reactive oxidative species ===
Nodularins are further implicated in the formation of reactive oxidative species (ROS), specifically superoxide and hydroxyl radicals, which consequently cause oxidative DNA damage via peroxidation of lipids, proteins, and DNA via an unknown mechanism.

=== Tumor promoting activity ===
Nodularins have received great attention as a carcinogenic threat, as the bacteria have tumor-initiating and tumor-promoting activity. Their tumor-promoting activity is much stronger than that of microcystins; this is believed to be due to the smaller ring structure of nodularins, which enables them to be more easily taken into hepatocytes. This tumor promoting activity is achieved through induced gene expression of TNF-alpha and proto-oncogenes, though the exact mechanism is unknown. Further, the tumor suppressor gene products retinoblastoma and p53 are inactivated by the phosphorylation (described above). If the tumor suppressor is inactivated, tumor growth is likely to occur.

Considered from a public health and epidemiologic standpoint, there is a correlation of primary liver cancer in areas of China with nodularins and microcystins in the water of ponds, ditches, rivers, and shallow wells.

Experiments in rats, where animals were exposed to non-lethal doses of nodularin, provided evidence of its carcinogenicity via tumor-initiating and tumor promoting activity. This is achieved by the inhibition of PP-1 and PP-2A. Nodularins have been implicated in the expression of the oncogenes and tumor suppressor genes tumor necrosis factor-alpha, c-jun, jun-B, jun-D, c-fos, fos-B and fra-1 gene expression. More data is needed to have a better understanding of the carcinogenicity of nodularins.

== Medical aspects ==
=== Symptoms ===
Symptoms of exposure include blistering around the mouth, sore throat, headache, abdominal pain, nausea and vomiting, diarrhea, dry cough and pneumonia. If non-lethal doses are consumed over time, damage to the liver may present as chronic symptoms of liver disease. These symptoms include jaundice, bleeding easily, swollen abdomen, mental disorientation or confusion, sleepiness or coma.

Nodularins typically affect aquatic life such as fish and plants. However, in certain cases, nodularins have been cited in the deaths of dogs, sheep, and humans (dawson et al.). Nodularin poisoning is not very prevalent in humans: very few cases have been reported and confirmed as nodularin poisoning.

=== Exposure ===
Nodularins can produce symptoms from ingestion, inhalation, and percutaneous contact. Methods of exposure include aspiration of the bacteria, dermal exposure, ingestion, and/or inhalation in recreational sports, professional fishing, or domestic uses such as showering. Conventional water treatment processes do not completely remove nodularins and microcystins from raw water. Nodularins can also be ingested via contaminated drinking water or contaminated seafood. Specifically nodularins have been detected in relatively high concentrations in Baltic clams, blue mussel, flounder, cod, and threespine-sticklebacks and relatively lower concentrations in herring and salmon. Further, nodularins have been documented as entering the human body through contaminated water during kidney dialysis. Blowing wind can spread substances from cyanobacterial blooms up to 10 km, increasing the area of potential exposure.

=== Toxicology ===
Currently, toxin concentrations are usually referred to as the mass of nodularins within the cells and those dissolved in a defined volume of water. The provisional safety guideline of nodularins is 1 microgram/ L. Lethal dose (LD) oral toxicity is estimated from microcystins and reported as 5 mg/kg. The toxicity of nodularins, based on LD and inhaled toxicities, is comparable to that of chemical organophosphate nerve agents.

=== Treatment ===
As nodularin poisoning is rare and it remains difficult to definitively distinguish poisoning from nodularins, there is no standard method of treatment. Further, because nodularins and microcystins have rapid, and irreversible liver damage, therapy has little to no value. Chronic exposure to low concentrations is equally detrimental to the liver. Serious precautions should be taken to avoid exposure.

Research has indicated that treating during and after with melatonin (dose: 15 mg/kg of body weight) may have protective functions against oxidative stress and damage induced by nodularins.

=== Safety ===
At risk populations for nodularin poisoning are human individuals, animals, and plants living within 10 km radius of seashore and lakefront areas. Additionally, humans 50 years and older are at elevated risk.

Safety guidelines can be implemented to reducing risk, specifically involving the cleanliness standards of drinking water. Microorganisms have been proven effective in the biodegradation and removal of nodularins, which could be useful in controlling cyanobacterial blooms in public water supplies. Protective clothing and physically avoiding areas of visible cyanobacterial blooms help reduce accidental exposures.

== Synthesis ==
Synthesis of nodularins is currently not well understood. The biosynthesis of nodularins is nonribosomal. Synthesis is conducted by multienzyme complexes, including peptide synthetases, polypeptide synthases, and tailoring enzymes. The gene cluster from N. spumigena is sequenced and its functionality is deduced from knowledge on related microcystin biosynthetic genes.

Nodularins may also be produced by other cyanobacteria. Some strains of Nostoc living in symbiosis with plants produce nodularin; other strains produce microcystin. It was debated which class of compounds were the original hepatotoxin: recent authors argue for nodularin having evolved from the microcystin synthesis machinery, while some older articles support the opposite.

A nodularin found in the marine sponge Theonella swinhoei, nodularin-V in systemaic nomenclature, is better known as motuporin. It is unclear how the sponge produces this chemical, with speculation that it may have come from a cyanobacterial symbioant.

== History ==
The first documented case of nodularin poisoning was an animal (sheep) in Australia in 1878. The chemical structure of nodularin-R was identified in 1988. In Caruaru, Brazil in 1996, dialysis solutions from a local reservoir were contaminated with blue-green algae. Patients receiving hemodialysis were exposed to these solutions, 100 of 131 developed acute liver failure and 52 of 131 patients died after developing toxic hepatitis.

== See also ==
- Microcystins
- Nonribosomal peptides
- Cyclic peptides
