= Anatoxin =

Anatoxin may refer to:

- Toxoid, a bacterial toxin (usually an exotoxin) whose toxicity has been weakened or suppressed
- Anatoxin-a, a neurotoxin produced by cyanobacteria
- Anatoxin-a(S), a neurotoxin produced by cyanobacteria
