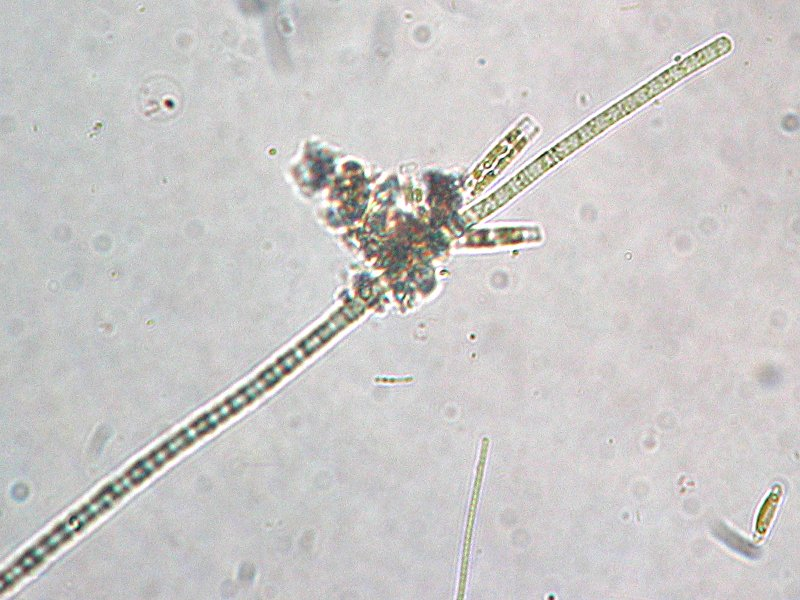
- Aphanizomenon flos-aquae

Scientific classification
- Domain: Bacteria
- Phylum: Cyanobacteria
- Class: Cyanophyceae
- Order: Nostocales
- Family: Aphanizomenonaceae; Elenkin

Genera
- Anabaenopsis (Wołoszyńska) Miller 1923; Aphanizomenon Morren ex Bornet & Flahault 1888; Chrysosporum Zapomělová et al. 2012; Cuspidothrix Rajaniemi et al. 2005; Cyanospira Florenzano et al. 1985; Cylindrospermopsis Seenayya & Subba Raju 1972; Dolichospermum (Ralfs) Wacklin et al. 2009; Nodularia Mertens in Jürgens ex Bornet & Flahault 1888; Raphidiopsis Fritsch & Rich 1929; Sphaerospermopsis Zapomělová et al. 2010; Umezakia M. Watanabe 1987

= Aphanizomenonaceae =

Family of cyanobacteria

The Aphanizomenonaceae are a family of cyanobacteria containing mostly genera which produce aerotopes. Cyanobacteria from the family Aphanizomenonaceae may form blooms in lentic freshwater bodies which may be dangerous for humans.
