= Aspartate 1-decarboxylase =

Class of enzymes

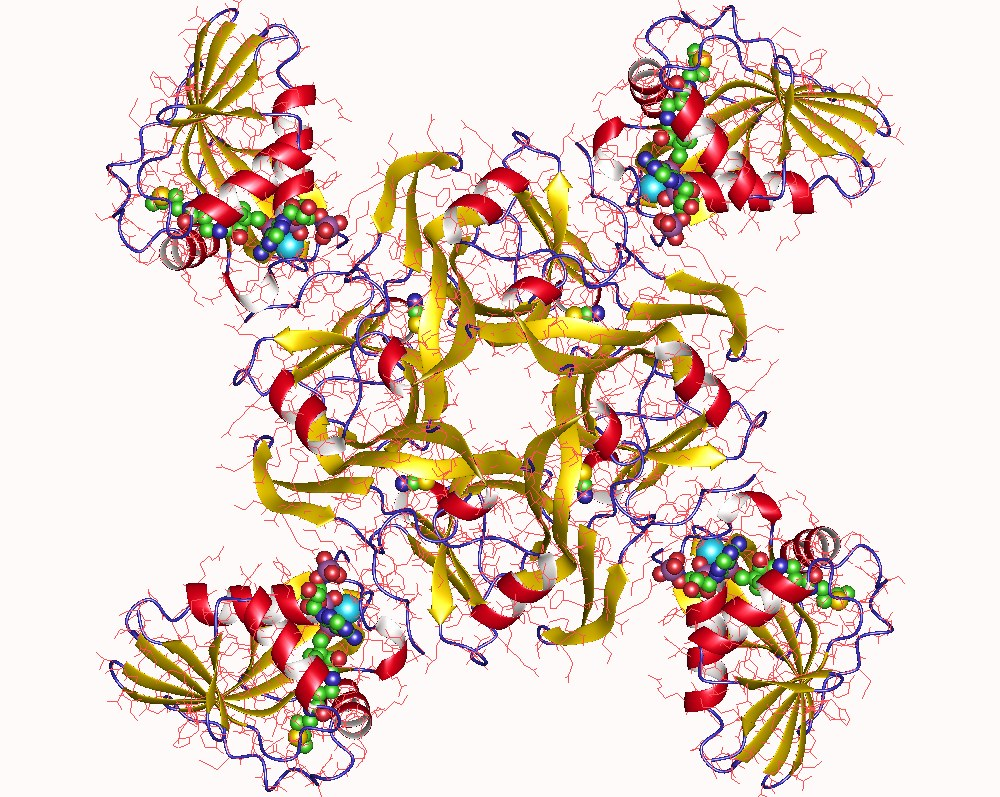
- aspartate 1-decarboxylase heterooctamer, E.Coli

Identifiers
- EC no.: 4.1.1.11
- CAS no.: 9024-58-2

Databases
- BRENDA: enzyme data
- ExPASy: NiceZyme view
- KEGG: enzyme entry
- MetaCyc: metabolic pathway
- Rhea: reactions
- PDB structures: RCSB PDB PDBe PDBsum
- Gene Ontology: AmiGO / QuickGO
Search
- PMC: articles
- PubMed: articles
- NCBI: proteins

Aspartate 1-decarboxylase (EC 4.1.1.11) is an enzyme characterised from Escherichia coli and also present in plants that catalyzes the decarboxylation of aspartic acid to β-alanine and carbon dioxide:

aspartic acid
CO_{2}
β-alanine

The mechanism of the reaction involves formation of a Schiff base at the active site.

This enzyme is a lyase, specifically a carboxy-lyase, which cleave carbon-carbon bonds. The systematic name of this enzyme class is L-aspartate 1-carboxy-lyase (beta-alanine-forming). Other names in use include aspartate alpha-decarboxylase, L-aspartate alpha-decarboxylase, aspartic alpha-decarboxylase, and L-aspartate 1-carboxy-lyase.

== Structural studies ==
As of late 2007, 12 structures have been solved for this class of enzymes, with PDB accession codes PDB: 1AW8, PDB: 1PPY, PDB: 1PQE, PDB: 1PQF, PDB: 1PQH, PDB: 1PT0, PDB: 1PT1, PDB: 1PYQ, PDB: 1PYU, PDB: 1UHD, PDB: 1UHE, and PDB: 2C45.
