= Cuspidothrix =

Scientific classification
- Domain: Bacteria
- Phylum: Cyanobacteria
- Class: Cyanophyceae
- Order: Nostocales
- Family: Nostocaceae
- Genus: Cuspidothrix; P.Rajaniemi, J.Komárek, R.Willame, P.Hrouzek, K.Kastovská, L.Hoffmann & K.Sivonen, 2005

Genus of bacteria

Cuspidothrix is a genus of cyanobacteria belonging to the family Nostocaceae.

The genus has almost cosmopolitan distribution.

Species:

- Cuspidothrix elenkinii (I.A.Kisselev) P.Rajaniem, J.Komárek, R.Willame, P.Hrouzek, K.Kastovská, L.Hoffmann & K.Sivonen
- Cuspidothrix issatschenkoi (Usačev) P.Rajan., Komárek, Willame, Hrouzek, Katovská, L.Hoffm. & Sivonen
- Cuspidothrix tropicalis (Horecká & Komárek) Rajan. et al.
