= Microcystin =

Cyanotoxins produced by blue-green algae

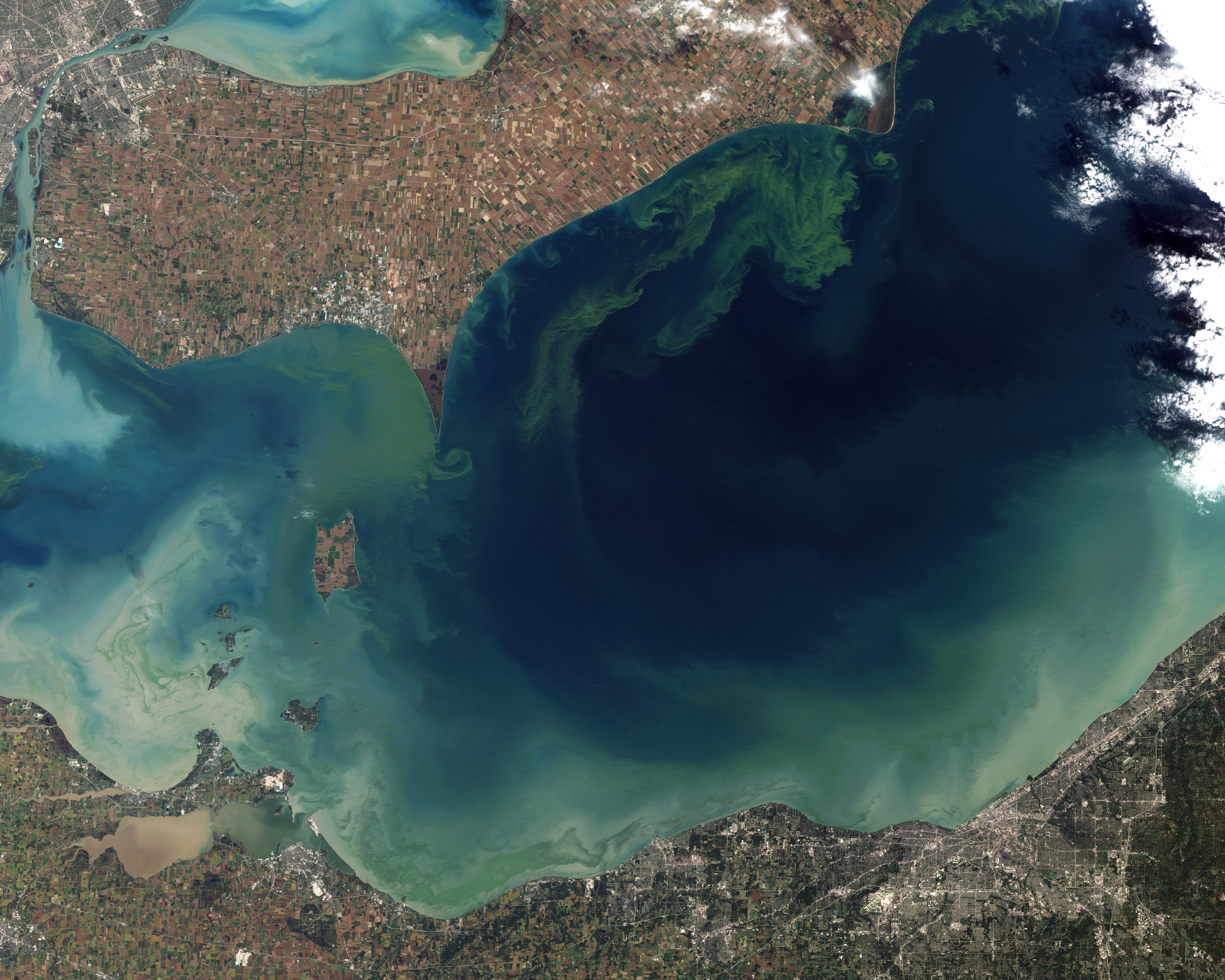
Lake Erie in October 2011, during an intense cyanobacteria bloom

Microcystins—or cyanoginosins—are a class of cyanotoxins, which are toxins produced by cyanobacteria, sometimes known as blue-green algae. Over 250 different microcystins have been discovered so far, of which microcystin-LR is the most common. Chemically they are cyclic heptapeptides produced through nonribosomal peptide synthases.

Cyanobacteria can produce microcystins in large quantities during algal blooms which then pose a major threat to drinking and irrigation water supplies, and the environment at large.

== Characteristics ==
Chemical structure of microcystin-LR

Microcystins—or cyanoginosins—are a class of toxins produced by certain freshwater cyanobacteria; primarily Microcystis aeruginosa but also other Microcystis, as well as members of the Planktothrix, Anabaena, Oscillatoria and Nostoc genera.

Microcystin-LR (i.e. X = leucine, Z = arginine) is the most toxic form of over 80 known toxic variants, and is also the most studied by chemists, pharmacologists, biologists, and ecologists. Microcystin-containing 'blooms' are a problem worldwide, including China, Brazil, Australia, South Africa, the United States and much of Europe. Hartebeespoort Dam in South Africa is one of the most contaminated sites in Africa, and possibly in the world.

== Chemistry ==
Microcystins have a common structural framework of D-Ala^{1}-X^{2}-D-Masp^{3}-Z^{4}-Adda^{5}-D-γ-Glu^{6}-Mdha^{7}, where X and Z are variable amino acids; the systematic name "microcystin-XZ" (MC-XZ in short) is then assigned based on the one letter codes (if available; longer codes otherwise) of the amino acids. If the molecule show any other modification, the differences are noted in square brackets before "MC". Of these, several are uncommon non-proteinogenic amino acids:

- D-Masp is D-erythro-β-methyl-isoaspartic acid, a derivative of aspartic acid in β-amino acid form;
- Adda is (all-S,all-E)-3-amino-9-methoxy-2,6,8-trimethyl-10-phenyldeca-4,6-dienoic acid, a β-amino acid exclusively found in microcystin and the related nodularin;
- Mdha is N-methyldehydroalanine, a derivative of dehydroalanine. In nodularin it is replaced by Mdhb (N-methyldehydrobutyrine), another dehydroamino acid derivative.

== Mechanism of action ==
Microcystins covalently bond to and inhibit protein phosphatases PP1 and PP2A and can thus cause pansteatitis. The ADDA residue is key to this functionality: greatly simplified synthetic analogues consisting of ADDA and one additional amino acid can show the same inhibiting function.

== Factors affecting production ==
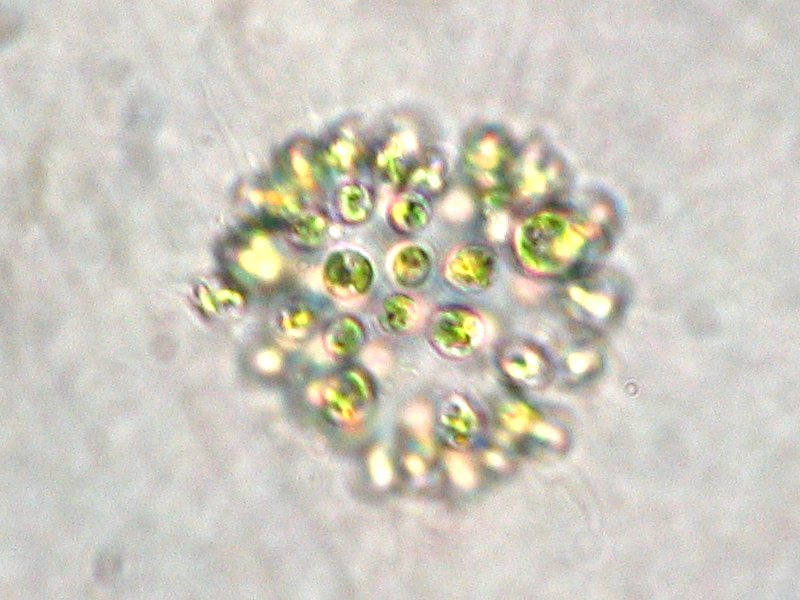
A culture of M. aeruginosa, a photosynthesizing bacterium

The microcystin-producing Microcystis is a genus of freshwater cyanobacteria and thrives in warm water conditions, especially in stagnant waters. The EPA predicted in 2013 that climate change and changing environmental conditions may lead to harmful algae growth and may negatively impact human health. Algal growth is also encouraged through the process of eutrophication (oversupply of nutrients). In particular, dissolved reactive phosphorus promotes algal growth.

Microcystins may have evolved as a way to deal with low iron supply in cyanobacteria: the molecule binds iron, and non-producing strains are significantly worse at coping with low iron levels. Low iron supply up-regulates McyD, one of the microcystin synthetic operons. Sufficient iron supply, however, can still boost microcystin production by making the bacterium better at photosynthesis, therefore producing sufficient ATP for MC biosynthesis.

Microcystin production is also positively correlated with temperature. Bright light and red light increases transcription of McyD, but blue light reduces it. A wide range of other factors such as pH may also affect MC production, but comparison is complicated due to a lack of standard testing conditions.

== Exposure pathways ==
There are several ways of exposure to these hepatotoxins that humans can encounter one of which is through recreational activities like swimming, surfing, fishing, and other activities involving direct contact with contaminated water. Another rare, yet extremely toxic, route of exposure that has been identified by scientists is through hemodialysis surgeries. One of the fatal cases for microcystic intoxication through hemodialysis was studied in Brazil where 48% of patients that received the surgery in a specific period of time died because the water used in the procedure was found to be contaminated.

Microcystins are chemically stable over a wide range of temperature and pH, possibly as a result of their cyclic structure. Microcystin-LR water contamination is resistant to boiling and microwave treatments. Microcystin-producing bacteria algal blooms can overwhelm the filter capacities of water treatment plants. Some evidence shows the toxin can be transported by irrigation into the food chain.

=== Lake Erie blooms ===
In 2011, a record outbreak of blooming microcystis occurred in Lake Erie, in part related to the wettest spring on record, and expanded lake bottom dead zones, reduced fish populations, fouled beaches, and damaged the local tourism industry, which generates more than $10 billion in revenue annually.

In August 2014, the City of Toledo, Ohio detected unsafe levels of microcystin in its water supply due to harmful algal blooms in Lake Erie, the shallowest of the Great Lakes. The city issued an advisory to approximately 500,000 people that the water was not safe for drinking or cooking. An Ohio state task force found that Lake Erie received more phosphorus than any other Great Lake, both from crop land, due to the farming practices, and from urban water-treatment centers.

=== San Francisco Bay Area ===
In 2016, microcystin had been found in San Francisco Bay Area shellfish in seawater, apparently from freshwater runoff, exacerbated by drought.

=== Iowa ===
In 2018, the Iowa Department of Natural Resources found microcystins at levels of 0.3 µg/L, or micrograms per liter (ppb), in the raw water supplies of 15 out of 26 public water systems tested.

=== Oregon ===
In 2023, the Oregon Department of Environmental Quality (DEQ) and Oregon Health Authority issued a cyanobacteria advisory for much of the Willamette River as it runs through Portland. The advisory affected the Willamette from the Ross Island Lagoon through Cathedral Park. Testing by the DEQ showed microcystin levels at 549 ppb.

== Human health effects upon exposure ==
Microcystins cannot be broken down by standard proteases like pepsin, trypsin, collagenase, and chymotrypsin due to their cyclic chemical nature. They are hepatotoxic, i.e., able to cause serious damage to the liver. Once ingested, microcystin travels to the liver via the bile acid transport system, where most is stored, though some remains in the blood stream and may contaminate tissue. Acute health effects of Microcystin-LR are abdominal pain, vomiting and nausea, diarrhea, headache, blistering around the mouth, and after inhalation sore throat, dry cough, and pneumonia.

Studies suggest that the absorption of microcystins occurs in the gastrointestinal tract. Furthermore, it was found that these hepatotoxins inhibit the activity of protein enzymes phosphatase PP1 and PP2A causing hemorrhagic shock and were found to kill within 45 minutes in mice studies.

There appears to be inadequate information to assess the carcinogenic potential of microcystins by applying EPA Guidelines for Carcinogen Risk Assessment. A few studies suggest a relationship may exist between liver and colorectral cancers and the occurrence of cyanobacteria in drinking water in China. Evidence is, however, limited due to limited ability to accurately assess and measure exposure.

== Regulation ==
In the US, the EPA issued a health advisory in 2015. A ten day Health Advisory was calculated for different ages which is considered protective of non-carcinogenic adverse health effects over a ten-day exposure to microcystins in drinking water: 0.3 μg/L for bottle-fed infants and young children of pre-school age and 1.6 μg/L for children of school age through adults.

== See also ==
- Microcystis
- Nodularin-R
