= 1955 in paleontology =

Paleontology or palaeontology is the study of prehistoric life forms on Earth through the examination of plant and animal fossils. This includes the study of body fossils, tracks (ichnites), burrows, cast-off parts, fossilised feces (coprolites), palynomorphs and chemical residues. Because humans have encountered fossils for millennia, paleontology has a long history both before and after becoming formalized as a science. This article records significant discoveries and events related to paleontology that occurred or were published in the year 1955.

== Plants ==
=== Pteridophyta ===
Name	Novelty	Status	Authors	Age	Type locality	Location	Notes	Images
Azolla primaeva	Comb nov	Valid	(Penhallow) Arnold	Ypresian	Allenby Formation	Canada	A waterfern, moved from Azollophyllum primaevum Penhallow, 1890	Azolla primaeva

== Arthropods ==
=== Crustaceans ===
Name	Novelty	Status	Authors	Age	Type locality	Location	Notes	Images
Eryon yehoachi	Sp nov	Jr. synonym	Remy and Avnimelech	Late Cretaceous (Campanian)	Mishash Formation	Israel	Moved to Ursquilla in 1998.	

== Dinosaurs ==
- Massospondylus gastroliths are documented.

=== Newly named dinosaurs ===
Data courtesy of George Olshevsky's dinosaur genera list.

Name	Status	Authors	Age	Unit	Location	Notes	Images
Majungasaurus	Valid taxon	René Lavocat	Late Cretaceous (Maastrichtian)	Maevarano Formation	Madagascar	A majungasaurine abelisaurid.	Majungasaurus
Tarbosaurus	Valid taxon	Evgeny Maleev	Late Cretaceous (late Campanian-early Maastrichtian)	Nemegt Formation Subashi Formation	Mongolia China	An Asian Tyrannosaurus-looking tyrannosaurid.	Tarbosaurus

== Synapsids ==
=== Theriodonts ===
Name	Status	Authors	Age	Unit	Location	Notes	Images
Sauroctonus	Valid	Bystrow	Late Permian	Semen Formation; Teekloof Formation	Russia	A gorgonopsian.	Sauroctonus
Scalenodon	Valid	Crompton and Parrington	Middle Triassic	Manda Formation	Tanzania	A traversodontid cynodont.	

=== Mammals ===
==== Eutherians ====
===== Cetaceans =====
Name	Status	Authors	Age	Unit	Location	Notes	Images
Lophocetus pappus	Now renamed Miminiacetus.	Kellogg	Middle Miocene (Langhian)				
Pelodelphis	Valid	Kellogg	Middle Miocene (Langhian)	Calvert Formation	* US (Maryland)	An odontocete of uncertain position.	
Tretosphys	Valid	Kellogg	Middle Miocene (Langhian)	Calvert Formation	Czech Republic US (Maryland, New Jersey, North Carolina and Virginia)	An odontocete of uncertain position; new genus for "Delphinapterus" gabbi Cope (1868).	

== Other Animals ==
Name	Status	Authors	Age	Unit	Location	Notes	Images
Dickinsonia spriggi	Synonym of Dickinsonia costata	Harrington & Moore	Ediacaran		Australia		
