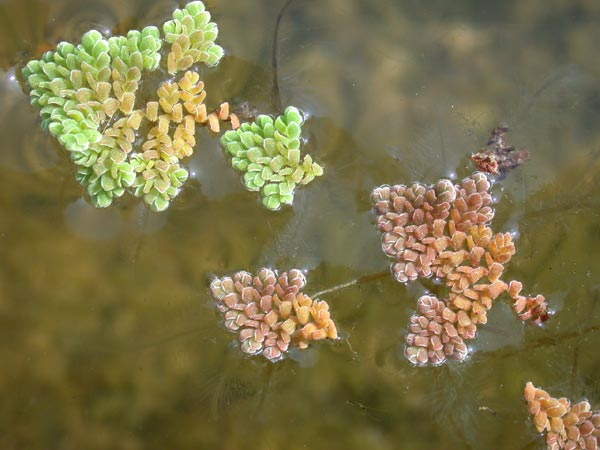

Conservation status
- Least Concern (IUCN 3.1)

Scientific classification
- Kingdom: Plantae
- Clade: Tracheophytes
- Division: Polypodiophyta
- Class: Polypodiopsida
- Order: Salviniales
- Family: Salviniaceae
- Genus: Azolla
- Species: A. pinnata

Binomial name
- Azolla pinnata R.Br.

= Azolla pinnata =

Species of aquatic plant

Azolla pinnata is a species of fern known by several common names, including mosquitofern, feathered mosquitofern and water velvet. It is native to much of Africa, Asia (Brunei Darussalam, China, India, Japan, Korea, and the Philippines) and parts of Australia. It is an aquatic plant, it is found floating upon the surface of the water. It grows in quiet and slow-moving water bodies because swift currents and waves break up the plant. At maximum growth rate, it can double its biomass in 1.9 days, with most strains attaining such growth within a week under optimal conditions.

A. pinnata is a small fern with a triangular stem measuring up to 2.5 centimeters in length that floats on the water. The stem bears many rounded or angular overlapping leaves each 1 or 2 millimeters long. They are green, blue-green, or dark red in color and coated in tiny hairs, giving them a velvety appearance. The hairs make the top surface of the leaf water-repellent, keeping the plant afloat even after being pushed under. A water body may be coated in a dense layer of the plants, which form a velvety mat that crowds out other plants. The hairlike roots extend out into the water. The leaves contain the cyanobacterium Anabaena azollae, which is a symbiont that fixes nitrogen from the atmosphere that the fern can use. This gives the fern the ability to grow in habitats that are low in nitrogen.

The plant reproduces vegetatively when branches break off the main axis, or sexually when sporocarps on the leaves release spores.

It is present in New Zealand as an introduced species and an invasive weed that has crowded out a native relative, Azolla rubra. It is a pest of waterways because its dense mats reduce oxygen in the water. The weevil Stenopelmus rufinasus is used as an agent of biological pest control to manage Azolla filiculoides, and it has been found to attack A. pinnata as well.

Rice farmers sometimes keep this plant in their paddies because it generates valuable nitrogen via its symbiotic cyanobacteria. The plant can be grown in wet soil and then plowed under, generating a good amount of nitrogen-rich fertilizer. The plant has the ability to absorb a certain amount of heavy metal pollution, such as lead, from contaminated water. It is 25-30% protein and can be added to chicken feed.

== Applications in environmental studies ==
Recent studies show the usefulness of Azolla pinnata in the remediation of environmental pollutants. There are two main methods for utilising A. pinnata to clean up environmental pollutants. The first method is by adsorption, which required the A. pinnata fronds to be processed into powder and agitated with the wastewater for a fixed duration. The pollutant will adhere to the organic functional groups on the surface of the A. pinnata powder. In adsorption studies, A. pinnata was reported in the remediation of dye wastewater containing methyl violet 2B, malachite green, rhodamine B, acid red 88 and acid blue 25.

The second remediation method is phytoremediation, where living A. pinnata is suspended on the surface of the wastewater. A. pinnata was primarily studied due to its high tolerance to environmental pollutants, and ability to hyperaccumulate heavy metals. Phytoremediation of industrial wastewater containing heavy metals (such as zinc, lead, chromium, mercury, cadmium, copper, arsenic) as well as organic dyes such as methyl violet 2B and malachite green are reported in literature. A.pinnata is also reported to be useful for treating the wastewater (remove nitrogenous waste and phosphorus) of poultry farms.
