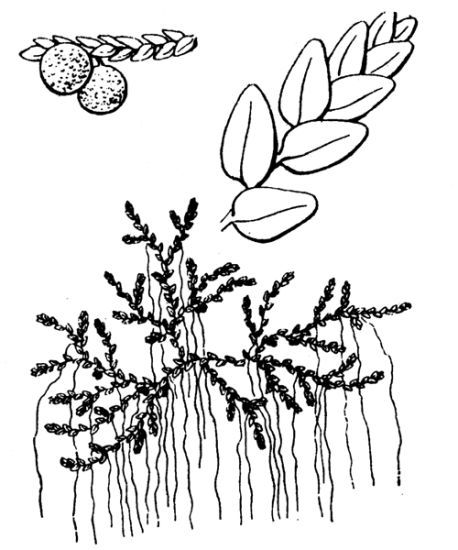
- Drawing circa 1905

Scientific classification
- Kingdom: Plantae
- Clade: Tracheophytes
- Division: Polypodiophyta
- Class: Polypodiopsida
- Order: Salviniales
- Family: Salviniaceae
- Genus: Azolla
- Species: A. mexicana

Binomial name
- Azolla mexicana Schltdl. & Cham. ex Kunze May 1845

Synonyms
- Azolla mexicana Schltdl. & Cham. 1830, name without description; Azolla mexicana C. Presl, December 1845

= Azolla mexicana =

Species of aquatic plant

Azolla mexicana, the Mexican mosquito fern, is an aquatic fern native to Mexico, British Columbia and the western United States (California, Oregon, Washington, Arizona, New Mexico, Texas, Utah, and Nevada).

There are reports of the species also occurring in the Great Plains of the central United States, but these reports need further study for verification.

== Description ==
Azolla mexicana is a floating aquatic with blue-green to dark red leaves. It is distinguished from the two other species of the genus present in North America, Azolla caroliniana and Azolla filiculoides, by having multicellular hairs on the leaves and pits on the megaspores.
