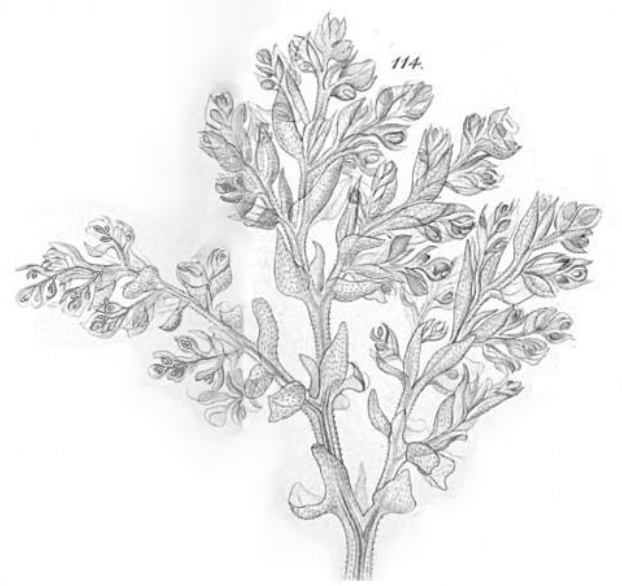

Conservation status
- Least Concern (IUCN 3.1)

Scientific classification
- Kingdom: Plantae
- Clade: Embryophytes
- Clade: Tracheophytes
- Division: Polypodiophyta
- Class: Polypodiopsida
- Order: Salviniales
- Family: Salviniaceae
- Genus: Azolla
- Species: A. nilotica

Binomial name
- Azolla nilotica Decne. ex Mett.

= Azolla nilotica =

Species of aquatic plant

Azolla nilotica is a medium-sized floating fern, that naturally occurs in the Nile and in eastern and central Africa. It is assigned to the family Salviniaceae.

== Description ==
Azolla nilotica is a floating water-bound fern of up to 32 cm (13 in) long, with a long, horizontal, branched, hairy rhizome of up to 2 mm (0.079 in) thick. Side branches are alternately set. The hairy roots spring in bundles from the nodes. Each leaf consists of an elliptic to broadly ovate green upper lobe of up to 2 mm (0.079 in) long, with a rounded or broadly pointed tip, with a nobbly middle and a broad translucent edge. The lower lobe lacks colour, is smaller, thinner and contains a cavity that holds the symbiont cyanophyte, that fixes aerial nitrogen making nitrate available to the plant. Azolla species have two types of spores (a state called heterosporous), small macrospores and minute microspores. The spore forming organs (called sporocarps) grow in the axils of the older leaves. In case of A. nilotica, the sporocarps occur in groups of four, and may consist of any combination of macrosporocarps and groups of microsporocarps (or massulae).

A. nilotica differs from other Azolla species by its larger habit, whereas other species, particularly those of the subgenus Azolla break into cm size fragments. A. nilotica also has its roots in bundles while all other species have single roots. The upper lobe of the leaf is larger than the lower, in contrast to A. filiculoides where the lower leaf is larger in outline. The sporocarps are in groups of four, not in pairs such as in the other species. The plant never attains a red color, such as is often seen towards the end of the growing season in all other Azolla species.

== Taxonomy ==
The name A. nilotica was first published by the German botanist Georg Heinrich Mettenius in the book Plantis Tinneanis, that was published in 1865, who credits French botanist Joseph Decaisne for the name.

=== Etymology ===
The species name nilotica refers to the fact that it was collected from the river Nile.

== Distribution ==
The species can be found in the eastern half of Africa, from southern Sudan, and South-Sudan to the Democratic Republic of Congo, Gabon, Rwanda, Burundi, Uganda, Kenya, Tanzania, Malawi, Mozambique, Zambia, and Zimbabwe. Late Holocene fossil spores have been found in the Nile Delta, among Cyperus papyrus. It may have gone extinct with the demise of large areas of papyrus reeds, due to the reclaim of these swamps for agriculture.

== Ecology and habitat ==
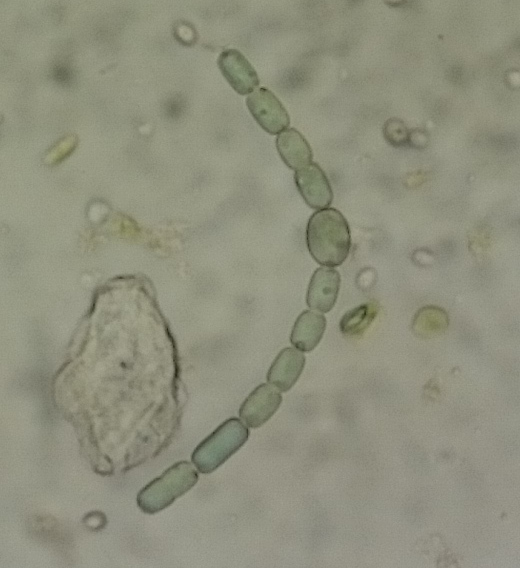
Trichormus azollae, syn. Anabaena azollae with heterocyst of Azolla sp.

Azolla nilotica has a symbiotic relationship with cyanobacteria that fix gaseous nitrogen into nitrate, of a species that has variously been called Anabaena azollae, Nostoc azollae or Trichormus azollae. It occurs in stagnant or slowly streaming water, such as temporary pools, waterholes and lake edges, and can persist on drying mud. It occurs from sea level to an altitude of 1650 m. It is intolerant of temperatures below 10 °C (50 °F), so there is little risk that the species will become naturalised outside of the tropics.

== Use ==
Due to its high nitrate content, the plant is used as green fertilizer, like other Azolla species. It's been widely used now to feed livestock and some other animals . Its acceptance is widely growing in Nigeria and other West African countries.
