= C16H30N2O3 =

The molecular formula C_{16}H_{30}N_{2}O_{3} (molar mass: 298.421 g/mol) may refer to:

- Nocuolin A
- Piroctone olamine
