= Chester A. Arnold =

American paleobotanist (1901–1977)

Chester Arthur Arnold
- Born: June 25, 1901; Leeton, Missouri (United States)
- Died: November 19, 1977 (aged 76); Ann Arbor, Michigan (US)
- Known for: North American Paleobotany
- Scientific career
- Fields: Paleobotany
- Workplaces: University of Michigan, Ann Arbor, Michigan

Chester Arthur Arnold was an American paleobotanist, born June 25, 1901, in Leeton, Missouri, and died on November 19, 1977.

== Family, education and career ==
He was the son of farmers Elmer and Edith Arnold. Arnold's family moved to Ludlowville, New York, and he attended Cornell University with the intent to study agriculture. Interaction with Loren Petry, a Cornell professor studying Devonian plants of the region, lead to Arnold shifting his focus to paleobotany. He received his Bachelor of Science in 1924, his Ph.D. in 1929 with his thesis on Devonian megafloral paleobotany. He started working at the faculty of botany, University of Michigan from 1928 and became curator of the collection of fossil plants in 1929. Arnold became a professor in 1947. He maintained close relations with researchers in India, being a friend of Birbal Sahni, of the Birbal Sahni Institute of Palaeobotany and served his year in residence from 1958 to 1959 at the institute. Arnold was a member of many learned societies and was the author of the Introduction to Paleobotany published in 1947.

== Research ==
Arnold did extensive research on the flora Paleozoic, Mesozoic and Tertiary of North America studying fossils from British Columbia to Oklahoma to Greenland. During his lifetime Arnold wrote approximately 121 publications, on subjects including the fossil conifers of Princeton, British Columbia, to the extinct water-fern, Azolla primaeva. He was honored with the Silver Medal from the Birbal Sahni Institute of Palaeobotany in 1972, and the Distinguished Service Award from the Paleobotanical Section of the Botanical Society of America. A number of fossil plants have been named in Arnold's honor including Koelreuteria arnoldi and Pseudolarix arnoldi.

== Correspondence ==
Arnold interacted with a number of eminent profession and amateur paleobotanists across the western US. While collecting fossils with Alonzo W. Hancock in the Clarno Formation of Oregon in 1941, Arnold and Hancock recovered the most complete Miomastodon skull known to date. In 1952 Arnold was the supervisor for Herman F. Becker who extensively studied the Ruby Basin Flora of Montana. Among the may correspondents of Arnold was Wesley C. Wehr, who became Affiliate curator of Paleobotany at the Burke Museum of Natural History and Culture in Seattle.
