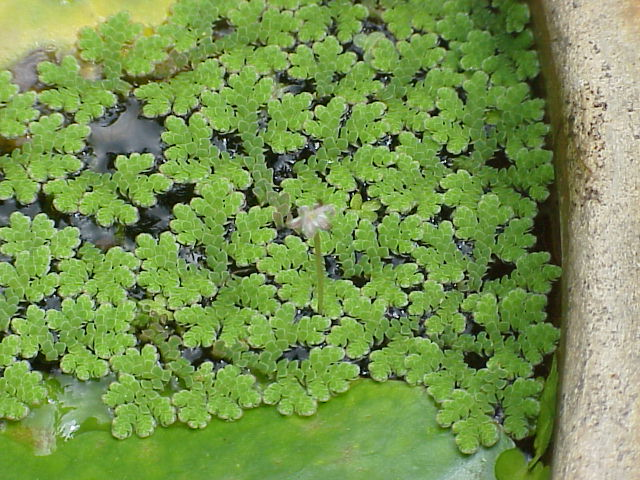
- Azolla caroliniana

Scientific classification
- Kingdom: Plantae
- Clade: Tracheophytes
- Division: Polypodiophyta
- Class: Polypodiopsida
- Order: Salviniales
- Family: Salviniaceae
- Genus: Azolla; Lam.

Type species
- Azolla filiculoides Lam.

Species
- Section Azolla: Azolla filiculoides Lam. Azolla rubra R. Br. Azolla caroliniana Willd. Azolla microphylla Kaulf. Azolla mexicana C. Presl. Azolla cristata Kaulf. Section Rhizosperma: Azolla pinnata R. Br. Azolla nilotica Decne. ex Mett.

Synonyms
- Carpanthus Rafinesque; Rhizosperma Meyen

= Azolla =

Azolla Temporal range: Campanian-Holocene

Genus of aquatic plants

Azolla (commonly called mosquito fern, water fern, and fairy moss) is a genus of seven species of aquatic ferns in the family Salviniaceae. They are extremely reduced in form and specialized, having a significantly different appearance to other ferns and more resembling some mosses or even duckweeds. Azolla filiculoides is one of first two fern species for which a reference genome has been published. It is believed that this genus grew so prolifically during the Eocene (and thus absorbed such a large amount of carbon) that it triggered a global cooling event that has lasted to the present.

Azolla may establish as an invasive plant in areas where it is not native. In such a situation, it can alter aquatic ecosystems and biodiversity substantially by exhausting oxygen and covering water surface making underwater plants unable to photosynthesise.

== Phylogeny and Taxonomy ==
Phylogeny of Azolla

- Azolla
  - section Rhizosperma
    - Azolla nilotica Decne. ex Mett.
    - Azolla pinnata R. Br.
  - section Azolla
    - - Azolla rubra R. Br.
      - Azolla filiculoides Lam.
    - - Azolla caroliniana Willdenow 1810
      - - Azolla mexicana C. Presl
        - Azolla microphylla Kaulf.

Other species include A. cristata, which has been proposed as a synonym for A. caroliniana, A. mexicana, and A. microphylla based on morphological similarities and priority. Azolla mexicana and microphylla are now considered to be conspecific and there is evidence that Azolla caroliniana may be two species.

There is considerable diversity of fossil Azolla and at least 50 extinct species are known from the fossil record including:

- Azolla intertrappea Sahni & H.S. Rao, 1934 (Eocene, India)
- Azolla berryi Brown, 1934 (Eocene, Green River Formation, Wyoming)
- Azolla prisca Chandler & Reid, 1926 (Oligocene, London Clay, Isle of Wight)
- Azolla tertiaria Berry, 1927 (Pliocene, Esmeralda Formation, Nevada)
- Azolla primaeva (Penhallow) Arnold, 1955 (Eocene, Allenby Formation, British Columbia)
- Azolla boliviensis Vajda & McLoughlin, 2005 (Maastrichtian – Paleocene, Eslaboacuten Formation and Flora Formation Bolivia)

The majority of Azolla fossils are of microspores embedded in massulae and megaspores and their megaspore apparatus. There are very few known examples of fossilized sporophytes. Notable examples include Azolla coloniensis, Azolla keuja, Azolla primaeva, Azolla schopfii, Azolla stanleyi, and Azolla velus. While there are two extant sections of Azolla recognized, there are six sections of Azolla described based on megaspore apparatus and massulae traits: Simplicispora (one float), Kremastospora (syn. Florschuetzia, more than nine floats, anchor-shaped glochidia), Filifera (more than nine floats, hair-like glochidia), Antiqua (six to nine floats), Azolla (three floats), and Rhizosperma (nine floats).

== Ecology ==
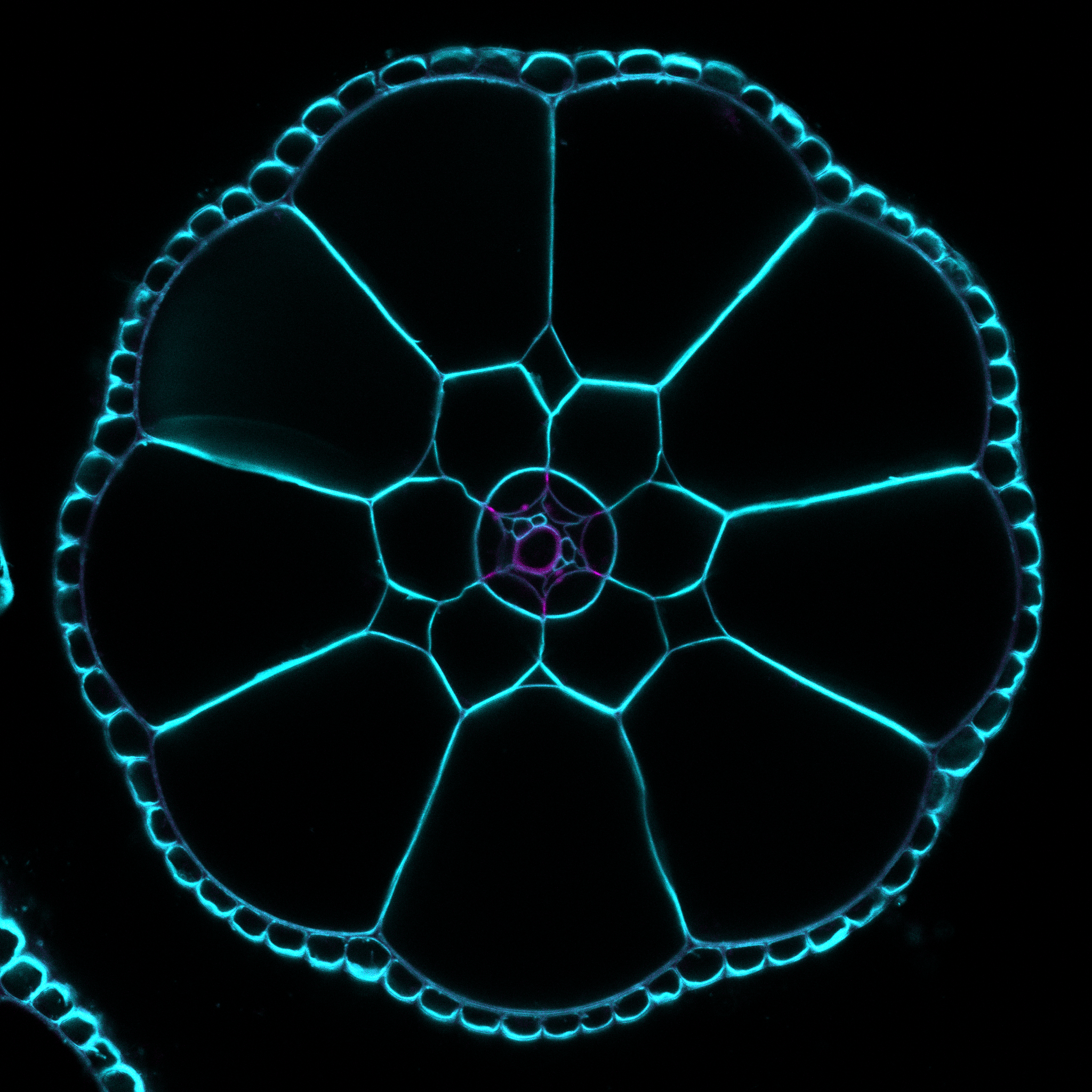
Azolla filiculoides root cross section

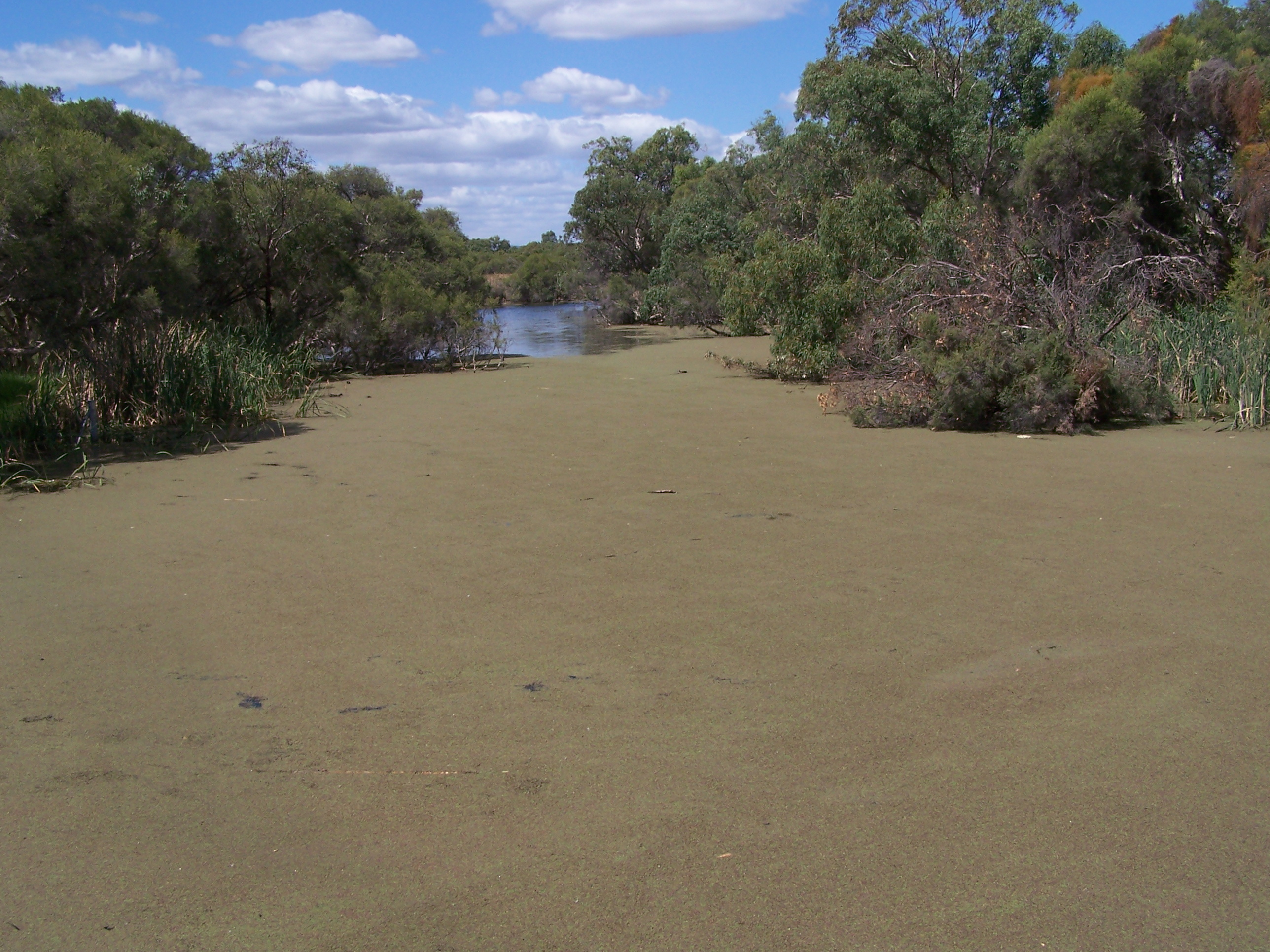
Azolla covering the Canning River (Western Australia)

Azolla is a highly productive plant that can double its biomass in 1.9 days, depending on growing conditions. The plant can yield can reach 8–10 tonnes fresh matter per hectare in Asian paddy fields. 37.8 tonnes fresh weight/ha (2.78 t/ha dry weight) has been reported for A. pinnata in India.

Azolla floats on the surface of water by means of numerous small, closely overlapping scale-like leaves, with their roots hanging in the water. They form a symbiotic relationship with the cyanobacterium Anabaena azollae, (Note: Currently Trichormus azollae (Strasburger 1884) Komárek and Anagnostidis 1989. Synonyms: Nostoc azollae Strasburger 1883, Anabaena azollae Strasburger 1884, Desikacharya azollae (Strasburger 1884) Saraf et al. 2019.) which lives outside the cells of its host and which fixes atmospheric nitrogen. The typical limiting factor on its growth is phosphorus; thus, an abundance of phosphorus—due for example to eutrophication or chemical runoff—often leads to Azolla blooms. Unlike all other known plants, its symbiotic microorganism transfers directly from one generation to the next. A. azollae is completely dependent on its host, as several of its genes have either been lost or transferred to the nucleus in Azolla's cells. There are also other bacteria that live in the Azolla leaf pocket that may have an ecological role and are potentially transferred somewhat reliably.

The nitrogen-fixing capability of Azolla has led to widespread use as a biofertiliser, especially in parts of southeast Asia. The plant has been used to bolster agricultural productivity in China for over a thousand years. When rice paddies are flooded in the spring, they can be planted with Azolla, which then quickly multiplies to cover the water, suppressing weeds. The rotting plant material resulting from the die-off of this Azolla releases nitrogen into the water for the rice plants, providing up to nine tonnes of protein per hectare per year.

Azolla are weeds in many parts of the world, entirely covering some bodies of water. While Azolla reduces the rate at which mosquito larvae survive, it is a myth that no mosquito can penetrate the coating of fern to lay its eggs in the water that gives the plant its common name "mosquito fern".

Most species can produce large amounts of deoxyanthocyanins in response to various stresses, including bright sunlight and extreme temperatures, causing the water surface to appear to be covered with an intensely red carpet. Herbivore feeding induces accumulation of deoxyanthocyanins and leads to a reduction in the proportion of polyunsaturated fatty acids in the fronds, thus lowering their palatability and nutritive value.

Azolla cannot survive winters with prolonged freezing, so is often grown as an ornamental plant at high latitudes where it cannot establish itself firmly enough to become a weed. It is also not tolerant of salinity; normal plants cannot survive in greater than 1–1.6‰, and even conditioned organisms die if grown in water with a salinity above 5.5‰.

=== Azolla filiculoides ===
Azolla filiculoides (red azolla) is the only member of the family Azollaceae found in Tasmania, where it is a common native aquatic plant. It is often found behind farm dams and other still waterbodies. The plants are small (usually only a few cm across) and float, but they are fast growing, and can be abundant and form large mats. The plants are typically red, and have small, water repellent leaves.

== Reproduction ==
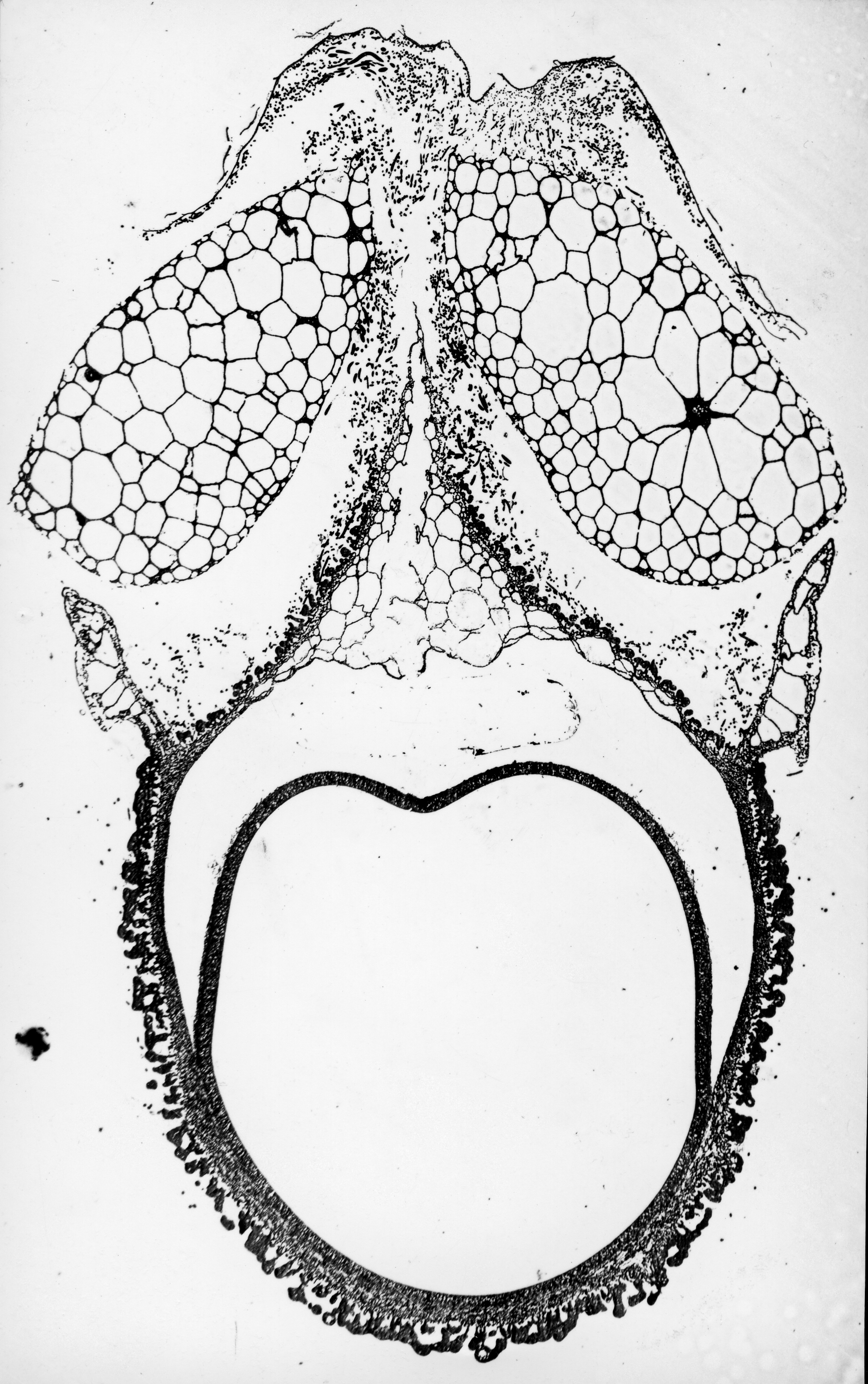
Transmission electron micrograph of a megaspore of the genus Azolla from postglacial sediments of Laguna El Junco, Galápagos Island of San Cristobal

Azolla reproduces sexually, and asexually by splitting.

Like all ferns, sexual reproduction leads to spore formation, but unlike other members of this group, Azolla is heterosporous, producing spores of two kinds. During the summer months, numerous spherical structures called sporocarps form on the undersides of the branches. The male sporocarp is greenish or reddish and looks like the egg mass of an insect or spider. It is two millimeters in diameter, and bears numerous male sporangia. Male spores (microspores) are extremely small and are produced inside each microsporangium. Microspores tend to adhere in clumps called massulae.

Female sporocarps are much smaller, containing one sporangium and one functional spore. Since an individual female spore is considerably larger than a male spore, it is termed a megaspore.

Azolla has microscopic male and female gametophytes that develop inside the male and female spores. The female gametophyte protrudes from the megaspore and bears a small number of archegonia, each containing a single egg. The microspore forms a male gametophyte with a single antheridium which produces eight swimming sperm. The barbed glochidia on the male spore clusters cause them to cling to the female megaspores, thus facilitating fertilization.

== Applications ==
=== Food and animal feed ===
In addition to its traditional cultivation as a bio-fertilizer for wetland paddies, Azolla is finding increasing use for sustainable production of livestock feed. Azolla is rich in protein, essential amino acids, vitamins, and minerals. Studies describe feeding Azolla to dairy cattle, pigs, ducks, and chickens, with reported increases in milk production, weight of broiler chickens and egg production of layers, as compared to conventional feed. One FAO study describes how Azolla integrates into a tropical biomass agricultural system, reducing the need for food supplements.

==== Concerns related to BMAA ====
Studies published in 2024 have found that "the Azolla–Nostoc azollae superorganism does not contain BMAA or their isomers DAB and AEG and that Azolla and N. azollae do not synthesize other common cyanotoxins." Concerns about biomagnification exist because the plant may contain the neurotoxin β-methylamino-L-alanine (BMAA) that remains present in the bodies of animals consuming it, and BMAA has been documented as passing along the food chain. Azolla may contain this substance that is a possible cause of neurodegenerative diseases, including causing ALS, Alzheimer's, and Parkinson's. Azolla has been suggested as a foodstuff for human consumption; however, no long-term studies of the safety of eating Azolla have been made on humans. Previous studies attributed neurotoxin production to Anabaena flos-aquae species, which is also a type of nitrogen-fixing cyanobacteria. Further research may be needed to ascertain whether A. azollae is a healthy foodstuff for humans.

==== Companion plant ====
Azolla has been used for at least one thousand years in rice paddies as a companion plant, to fix nitrogen and to block out light to prevent competition from other plants. Rice is planted when tall enough to poke through the Azolla layer. Mats of mature Azolla can also be used as a weed-suppressing mulch.

Rice farmers used Azolla as a rice biofertilizer 1500 years ago. The earliest known written record of this practice is in a book written by Jia Sixie in 554 CE in Qimin Yaoshu (Essential Techniques for the Welfare of the People). By the end of the Ming dynasty in the early 17th century, Azolla's use as a green compost was documented in local records.

=== Larvicide ===
The myth that no mosquito can penetrate the coating of fern to lay its eggs in the water gives the plant its common name "mosquito fern". Azolla have been used to control mosquito larvae in rice fields. The plant grows in a thick mat on the surface of the water, making it more difficult for the larvae to reach the surface to breathe, effectively choking the larvae.

=== Paleoclimatology and climate change ===
Azolla has been proposed as a carbon sequestration modality. The proposal draws upon the hypothesized Azolla event that asserts that 55 million years ago, Azolla covered the Arctic – at the time a hot, tropical, freshwater environment – and then sank, permanently sequestering teratons of carbon that would otherwise have contributed to the planet's greenhouse effect. This ended a warming event that reached 12–15 °C (22–27 °F) warmer than present-day averages, eventually causing the formation of ice sheets in Antarctica and the current "icehouse period".

== Invasive species ==
This fern has been introduced to other parts of the world, including the United Kingdom, where it has become a pest in some areas. A nominally tropical plant, it has adapted to colder climates. Azolla filiculoides is especially invasive because it has the ability to survive temperatures as low as −22 °C (−8 °F) and can survive even thin layers of ice built up on its growth. A. filiculoides spreads at rapid pace by way of both fragmentation of its rhizome (root-system), and dispersal via spores. It can double its surface area and/or density in approximately 7–10 days under ideal conditions. Much like duckweed Lemna minor, A. filiculoides can rapidly displace other species and disrupt aquatic ecosystems by altering abiotic conditions in waterways where it has been introduced and even within its native range. It can form mats up to 30 centimetres (12 in) thick, covering up to 100% of the water surface, preventing native fish, amphibians and invertebrates from reaching the waters surface while its abundant growth displaces native vegetation.

== Bioremediation ==
Azolla can remove chromium, nickel, copper, zinc, and lead from effluent. It can also remove lead from solutions containing 1–1000 ppm.
