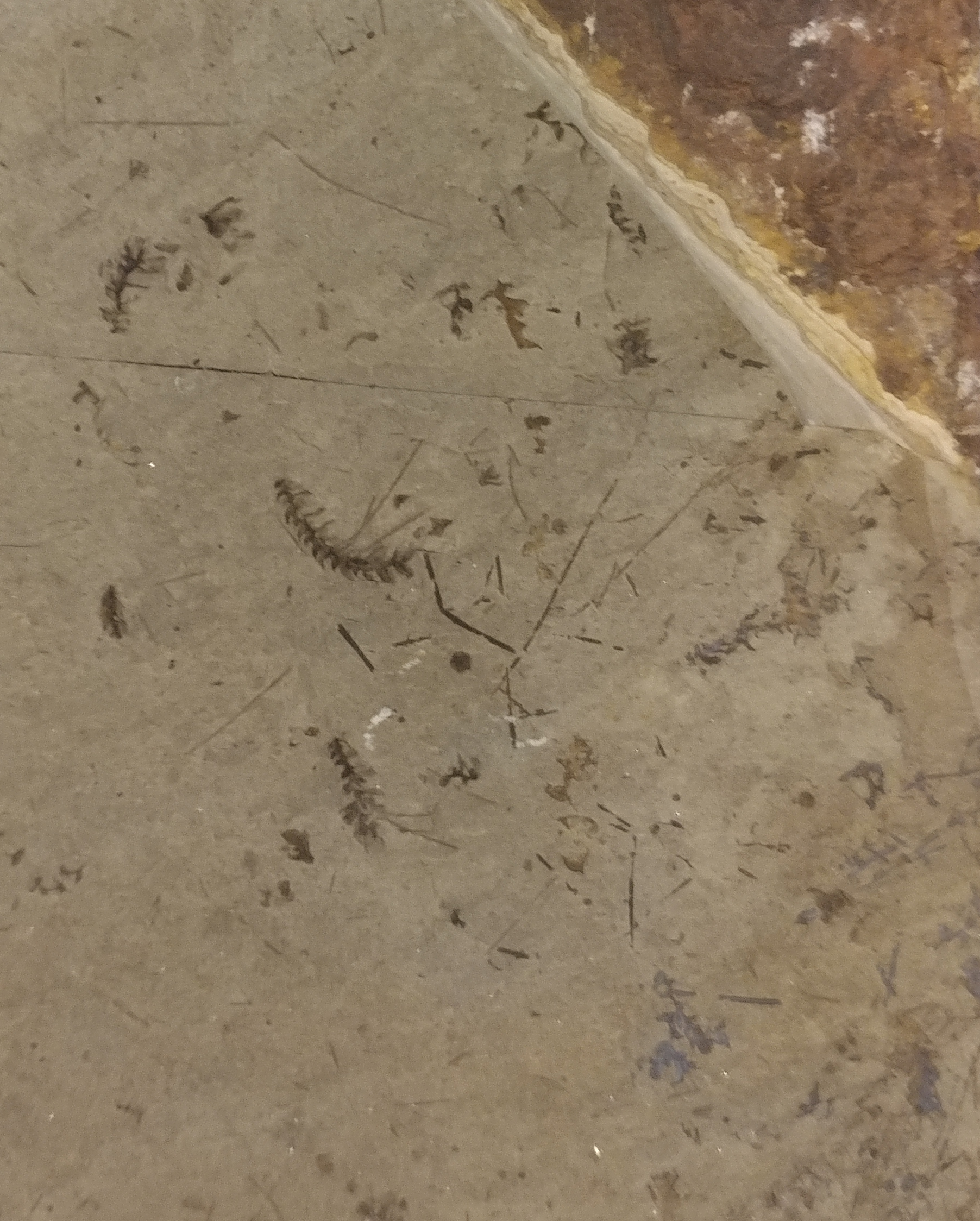
- leaves and stems, Klondike Mountain formation

Scientific classification
- Kingdom: Plantae
- Clade: Tracheophytes
- Division: Polypodiophyta
- Class: Polypodiopsida
- Order: Salviniales
- Family: Salviniaceae
- Genus: Azolla
- Species: †A. primaeva

Binomial name
- †Azolla primaeva (Penhallow) Arnold, 1955

Synonyms
- Azollophyllum primaevum

= Azolla primaeva =

Azolla primaeva Temporal range: 50–49 Ma

Extinct species of aquatic plant

Azolla primaeva is an extinct species of "water fern" in the family Salviniaceae known from Eocene fossils from the Ypresian stage (56 to 48 million years ago), found in southern British Columbia.

The species was first described from poorly preserved material collected in the Similkameen River area near Princeton, British Columbia and later noted from outcrops at Stump Lake northeast of Princeton. The fossils were described by David P. Penhallow in the 1890 volume On Fossil Plants from the Smilkameen Valley and Other Places in the Southern Interior of British Columbia. Though the volume only lists John William Dawson as author, Dawson notes that the A primaevum description had been written by Penhallow. Due to the poor nature of the type specimen the species was placed in the form genus Azollophyllum as Azollophyllum primaevum indicating its similarity to the modern genus, but at the same time acknowledging lack of detail needed to confirm its placement in the genus.

Placement of the species was formally changed with the publication of a paper written by Chester A. Arnold based on new fossil specimens collected near the former mining camp of Ashnola, British Columbia, approximately 8 miles south of Princeton along the Similkimeen River. The fossils were recovered from strata of the Allenby Formation, at the time considered Oligocene age, but now known to be of the Early Middle Eocene.

The specimens were studied by Arnold of the University of Michigan who published the 1955 type redescription for A. primaeva in the Contributions from the Museum of. Paleontology, University of Michigan, Volume 12. Arnold noted the new specimens to consist of leafy vegetation and roots often forming mats in the rock. The plants are accompanied by microspore massulae and megasporangia.

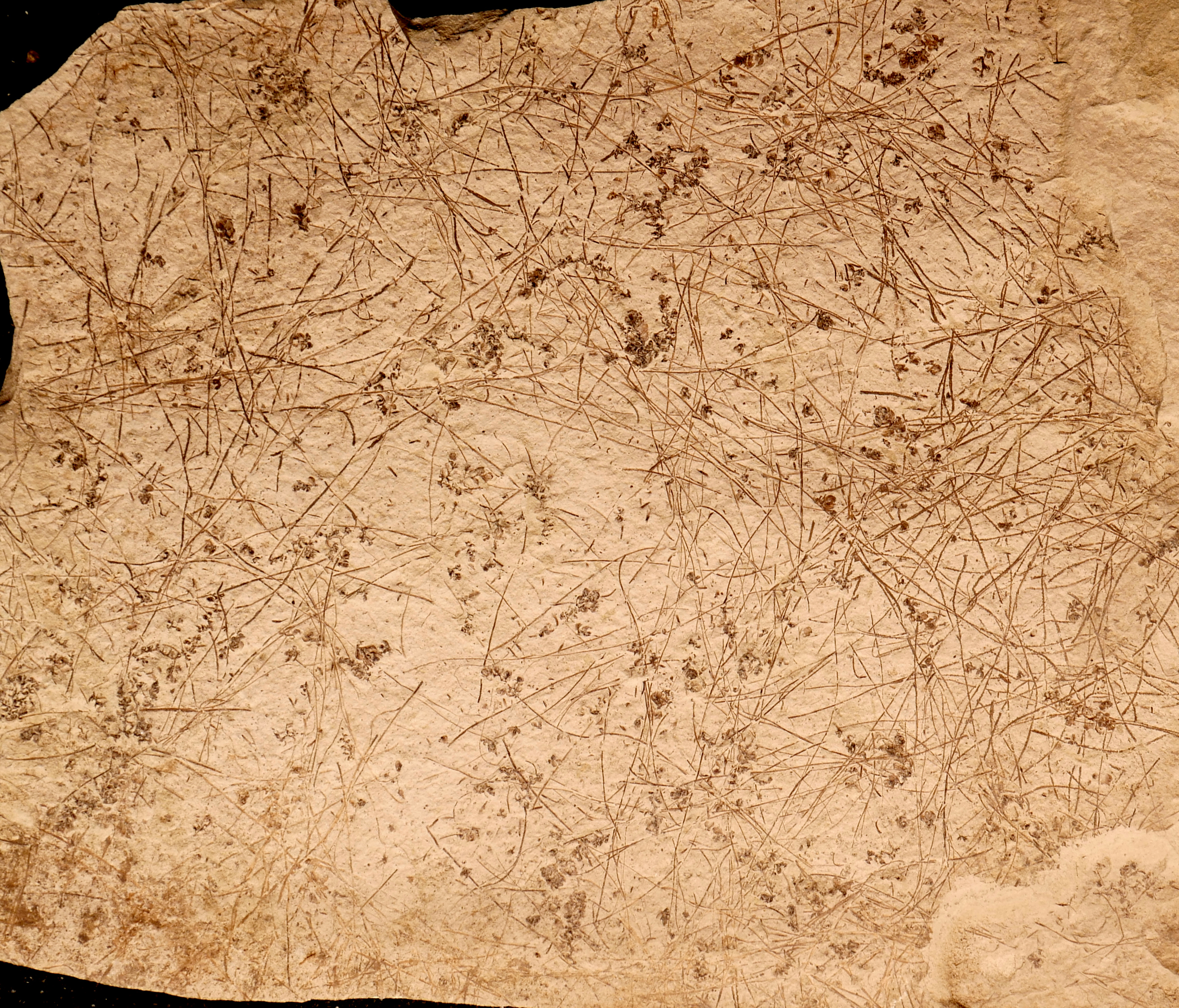
Fossil mat of A. primaeva Stonerose Interpretive Center

At the time this paper was published, four species of Azolla had been described from the fossil record. The oldest species at that time was A. intertrappea from Eocene age strata in India and described in 1934 by Birbal Sahni and H. S. Rao. Also in 1934, Roland W. Brown described a similarly aged species, A. berryi, from the Middle Eocene Green River Formation. An Oligocene species, A. prisca, was published from the London Clays of England eight years earlier in 1926 by Marjorie E.J. Chandler and Eleanor M. Reid. The youngest of the fossil species was A. tertiaria described by Edward W. Berry in 1927 from Pliocene fossils found in the Esmeralda Formation of Nevada. Arnold notes that with the placement of A. primaeva into the genus Azolla means that its description in 1890 was actually the earliest species described from the fossil record.

After comparing the new fossil specimens to both modern and fossil species as much as he was able with the descriptions available, Arnold noted A. primaeva to be close in morphology to the living A.filiculoides and the Eocene A. intertrappea of India. Fossil specimens of Azolla have been recovered from the closely related strata of the Klondike Mountain Formation around Republic, Washington, but have not been described to species.
