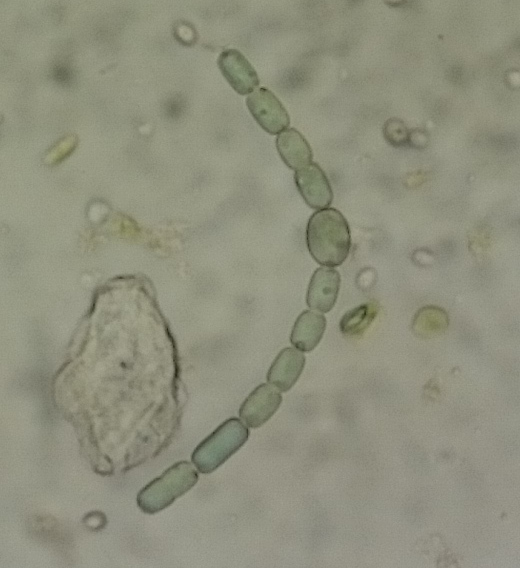

Scientific classification
- Domain: Bacteria
- Kingdom: Bacillati
- Phylum: Cyanobacteriota
- Class: Cyanophyceae
- Order: Nostocales
- Family: Aphanizomenonaceae
- Genus: Trichormus
- Species: T. azollae

Binomial name
- Trichormus azollae (Strasburger 1884) Komarek and Anagnostidis 1989

Synonyms
- Anabaena azollae Strasburger, 1884; Nostoc azollae Strasburger, 1873 nom.inval.

= Anabaena azollae =

Trichormus azollae a species of filamentous, heterocyst-forming cyanobacterium that is involved in symbiosis with various plants in the genus Azolla such as Azolla filiculoides.

In terms of 16S RNA, the strain found in A. filiculoides is very close to Anabaena oscillarioides with 99.3% identity. The many "Azolla cyanobiont" 16S sequences as recorded on NCBI GenBank do not neatly form a cluster that excludes other named cyanobacterial species; high-identity (> 98.7%) matches include Anabaena azotica and Wollea saccata.

The genome of a strain known as 0708, isolated from A. filiculoides, has been sequenced. Contrary to 16S comparison results, GTDB Release 10 does find enough genomic diveregence between A. azotica (Trichormus azoticus) and T. azollae (Trichormus_B azollae) for them to be separate species. It goes further to put them in separate genera.
