= Azolla event =

Hypothetical geoclimatic event

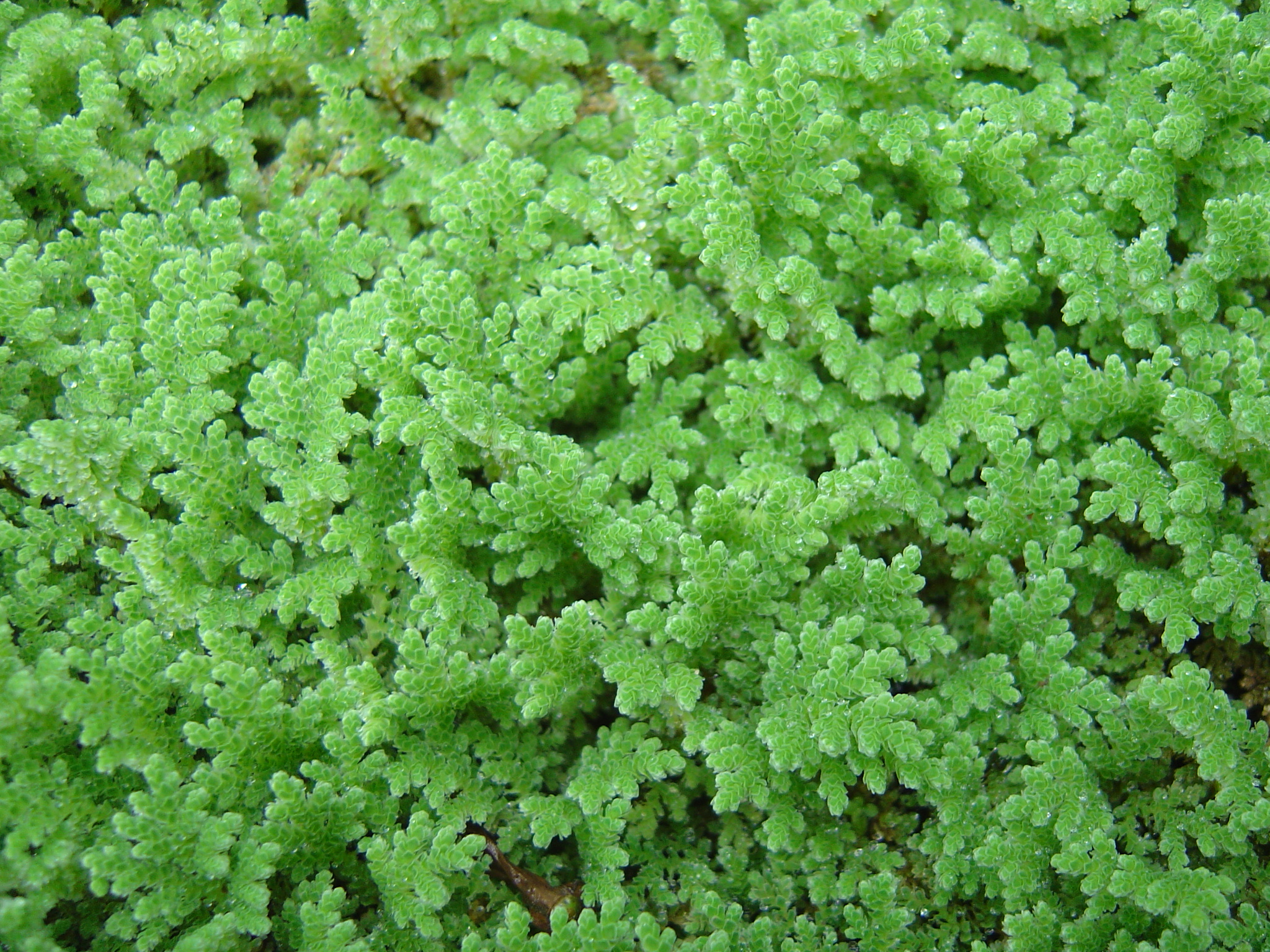
The modern fern Azolla filiculoides. Blooms of a related species may have pulled the Earth into the current icehouse world.

The Azolla event is a paleoclimatology scenario hypothesized to have occurred in the middle Eocene epoch, around 49 million years ago, when blooms of the carbon-fixing freshwater fern Azolla are thought to have happened in the Arctic Ocean. As the fern died and sank to the stagnant sea floor, it were incorporated into the sediment over a period of about 800,000 years; the resulting draw-down of carbon dioxide has been speculated to have helped reverse the planet from the "greenhouse Earth" state of the Paleocene-Eocene Thermal Maximum, when the planet was hot enough for turtles and palm trees to prosper at the poles, to the current icehouse Earth known as the Late Cenozoic Ice Age.

== Geological evidence of the event ==
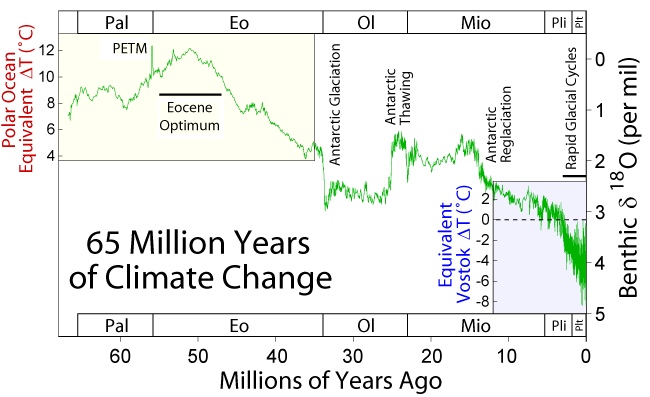
δ^{18}O – a proxy for temperature – over the past 65 million years. The Azolla event marks the end of the Eocene optimum and the beginning of a long-term decline in global temperatures.

In sedimentary layers throughout the Arctic basin, a unit reaching at least 8 m in thickness (the bottom of the longest core was not recovered, but it may have reached 20 m+) is discernible. This unit consists of alternating layers; siliceous clastic layers representing the background sedimentation of planktonic organisms, usual to marine sediments, switch with millimetre-thick laminations comprising fossilised Azolla matter. This organic matter can also be detected in the form of a gamma radiation spike, that has been noted throughout the Arctic basin, making the event a useful aid in lining up cores drilled at different locations. Palynological controls and calibration with the high-resolution geomagnetic reversal record allows the duration of the event to be estimated at 800,000 years. The event coincides precisely with a catastrophic decline in carbon dioxide levels, which fell from 3500 ppm in the early Eocene to 650 ppm during this event.

== Azolla ==
Azolla has been deemed a "super-plant" as it can draw down as much as a tonne of nitrogen per acre per year (0.25 kg/m^{2}/yr); this is matched by 6 tonnes per acre of carbon drawdown (1.5 kg/m^{2}/yr). Its ability to use atmospheric nitrogen for growth means that the main limit to its growth is usually the availability of phosphorus: carbon, nitrogen and sulphur being three of the key elements of proteins, and phosphorus being required for DNA, RNA and in energy metabolism. The plant can grow at great speed in favourable conditions – modest warmth and 20 hours of sunlight, both of which were in evidence at the poles during the early Eocene – and can double its biomass over two to three days in such a climate. This rate of growth pushes the plants deep under away from sunlight where death and carbon sequestration occur.

== Conditions encouraging the event ==
The continental configuration during the Early Eocene resulted in an isolated Arctic basin.

During the early Eocene, the continental configuration was such that the Arctic Sea was almost entirely cut off from the wider oceans. This meant that mixing — provided today by deep water currents such as the Gulf Stream — did not occur, leading to a stratified water column resembling today's Black Sea. High temperatures and winds led to high evaporation, increasing the density of the ocean, and — through an increase in rainfall — high discharge from rivers which fed the basin. This low-density freshwater formed a nepheloid layer, floating on the surface of the dense sea. Even a few centimetres of fresh water would be enough to allow colonization by Azolla; further, this river water would be rich in minerals such as phosphorus, which it would accumulate from mud and rocks it interacted with as it crossed the continents. To further aid the growth of the plant, concentrations of carbon (in the form of carbon dioxide) in the atmosphere are known to have been high at this time.

Blooms alone are not enough to have any geological impact; to permanently draw down CO_{2} and cause climate change, the carbon must be sequestered by the plants being buried and the remains rendered inaccessible to decomposing organisms. The anoxic bottom of the Arctic basin, a result of the stratified water column, permitted just this; the anoxic environment inhibits the activity of decomposing organisms and allows the plants to sit unrotted until they are buried by sediment.

== Global effects ==
With 800,000 years of Azolla bloom episodes and a 4,000,000 km^{2} (1,500,000 sq mi) basin to cover, even by very conservative estimates more than enough carbon could be sequestered by plant burial to account for the observed 80% drop in CO_{2} by this one phenomenon alone. Other factors almost certainly played a role. This drop initiated the switch from a greenhouse to the current icehouse Earth; the Arctic cooled from an average sea-surface temperature of 13 °C to today's −9 °C, and the rest of the globe underwent a similar change. For perhaps the first time since Snowball Earth (over half a billion years earlier), the planet had ice caps at both of its poles. A geologically rapid decrease in temperature between 49 and 47 million years ago, around the Azolla event, is evident; dropstones (which are taken as evidence for the presence of glaciers) are common in Arctic sediments thereafter. This is set against a backdrop of gradual, long-term cooling; it is not until 15 million years ago that evidence for widespread northern polar freezing is common.

== Alternative explanations ==
While a verdant Arctic Ocean is a viable working model, skeptical scientists point out that it would be possible for Azolla colonies in river deltas or freshwater lagoons to be swept into the Arctic Ocean by strong currents, removing the necessity for a freshwater layer.

== Economic considerations ==
Much of the current interest in oil exploration in the Arctic regions is directed towards the Azolla deposits. The burial of large amounts of organic material provides the source rock for oil, so given the right thermal history, the preserved Azolla blooms might have been converted to oil or gas. In 2008 a research team was set up in the Netherlands devoted to Azolla.

Ediacaran
Cambrian
Ordovician
Devonian
Carboniferous
Permian
Triassic
Jurassic
Cretaceous
Paleogene
Neogene
Quaternary
Neoproterozoic
Palæozoic
Mesozoic
Cenozoic
│
−600
│
−480
│
−360
│
−240
│
−120
│
0
Millions of years ago
Age of Earth = 4,540 million years (off to the left). Complex life started with the Palæozoic.
The "Age of the Dinosaurs" was the Mesozoic. Tool-using humans have only been around for the last few million years on the far right.

== See also ==
- Paleocene-Eocene Thermal Maximum
