= Nocuolin A =

Names
- IUPAC name 1-[(6R)-4,6-Dipentyl-5,6-dihydrooxadiazin-2-yl]-3-hydroxypropan-1-one

Identifiers
CAS Number	2640864-47-5
3D model (JSmol)	Interactive image
ChEBI	CHEBI:213534
ChemSpider	111054822
PubChem CID	163111245
- SMILES: C(CCO)(=O)N1N=C(CCCCC)C[C@@H](CCCCC)O1

Properties
Chemical formula	C_{16}H_{30}N_{2}O_{3}
Molar mass	298.427 g·mol^{−1}
- Except where otherwise noted, data are given for materials in their standard state (at 25 °C [77 °F], 100 kPa). Infobox references

Nocuolin A is a secondary metabolite derived from the cyanobacterium Nostoc sp., Nodularia sp., and Anabaena sp. This secondary metabolite is produced by enzymes of the noc biosynthetic gene group. Also, exhibits anticancer activity that may alter mitochondrial oxidative phosphorylation, thereby inducing antiproliferative effects and apoptosis. Its structure contains a 3-hydroxypropanoyl group, two alkyl chains, and a 1,2,3-oxadiazine core

== History ==
In 2017, Nocuolin A was isolated from the cyanobacterium strains Nostoc sp. CCAP 1453/38. Nocuolin A was purified using hydrophobic and high-performance countercurrent chromatography (HPCC) and semipreparative HPLC. Nocuolin A is notable for its antiproliferative, antifouling, anti-amoebic, antiparasitic, and anthelmintic activity. Its antiproliferative activity against tumor cells has an IC_{50} between 0.72 and 4.5 µM. Its antifouling activity inhibits marine organisms such as Mytilus galloprovincialis, preventing them from adhering to surfaces. It can also cause cell death in diatoms such as Navicula sp. The anti-amoebic activity of Nocuolin A induces encystment in Acanthamoeba castellanii (IC50: ~1.7 µM) and Dictyostelium discoideum (IC50: ~0.1 µM). Nocuolin A is effective against protozoa such as Trypanosoma brucei (IC50 = 3.99 µM) and Leishmania infantum (IC50 = 0.21 µM). Finally, its anthelmintic activity results in an inhibition of nematode development.

== Mechanism of action ==
The primary mechanism of action of Nocuolin A is the inhibition of mitochondrial oxidative phosphorylation (OXPHOS), which leads to decreased ATP production, induces metabolic stress, activates autophagy, and produces BCL-2 family-independent apoptosis. Nocuolin A also induces caspase-dependent apoptosis by activating caspase-3.

== Biosynthesis ==
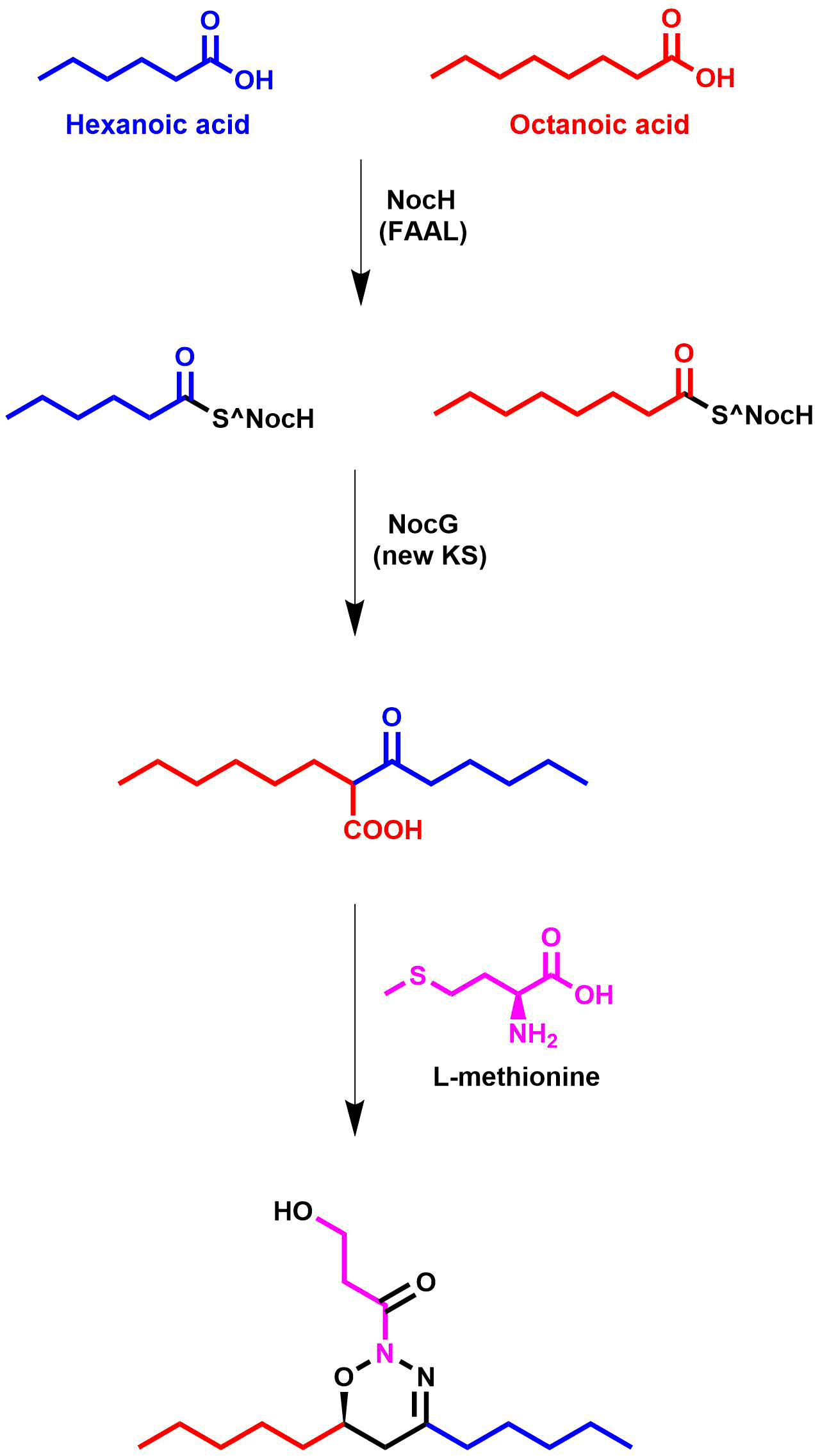
Biosynthesis of Nocuolin A

The biosynthesis of Nocuolin A is a hybrid fatty acid-derived biosynthesis, constructed from hexanoic acid, octanoic acid, and L-methionine. The first step is the activation of NocH (hexanoic acid and octanoic acid), which, from acyl-AMP, produces acyl-ACP. Next, a carbon-carbon bond is formed between hexanoic acid and octanoic acid by the enzyme NocG (ketosynthase), producing a C13 β-keto acid. A spontaneous decarboxylation then occurs, resulting in the loss of CO_{2} and the formation of a ketone intermediate. L-methionine interacts with the nitrogen to form 3-hydroxypropanoyl, and from this product, an oxadiazine ring is formed. Finally, Nocuolin A is produced and a chiral center was discovered in the structure whose absolute configuration is currently unknown.

== In vitro studies ==
In vitro studies have been conducted using cell models such as HCTII6 for colon cancer, MCF7 for breast cancer, and hTERT RPE-1, which are immortalized normal epithelial cells, to demonstrate their mechanism of action in OXPHOS inhibition. In vitro studies have also been performed using HeLa cells from cervical cancer, the A549 cell line from lung cancer, U251 and U87 glioma cells, and OVCAR5 ovarian cancer cells, demonstrating the mechanism of action of caspase-dependent apoptosis.
