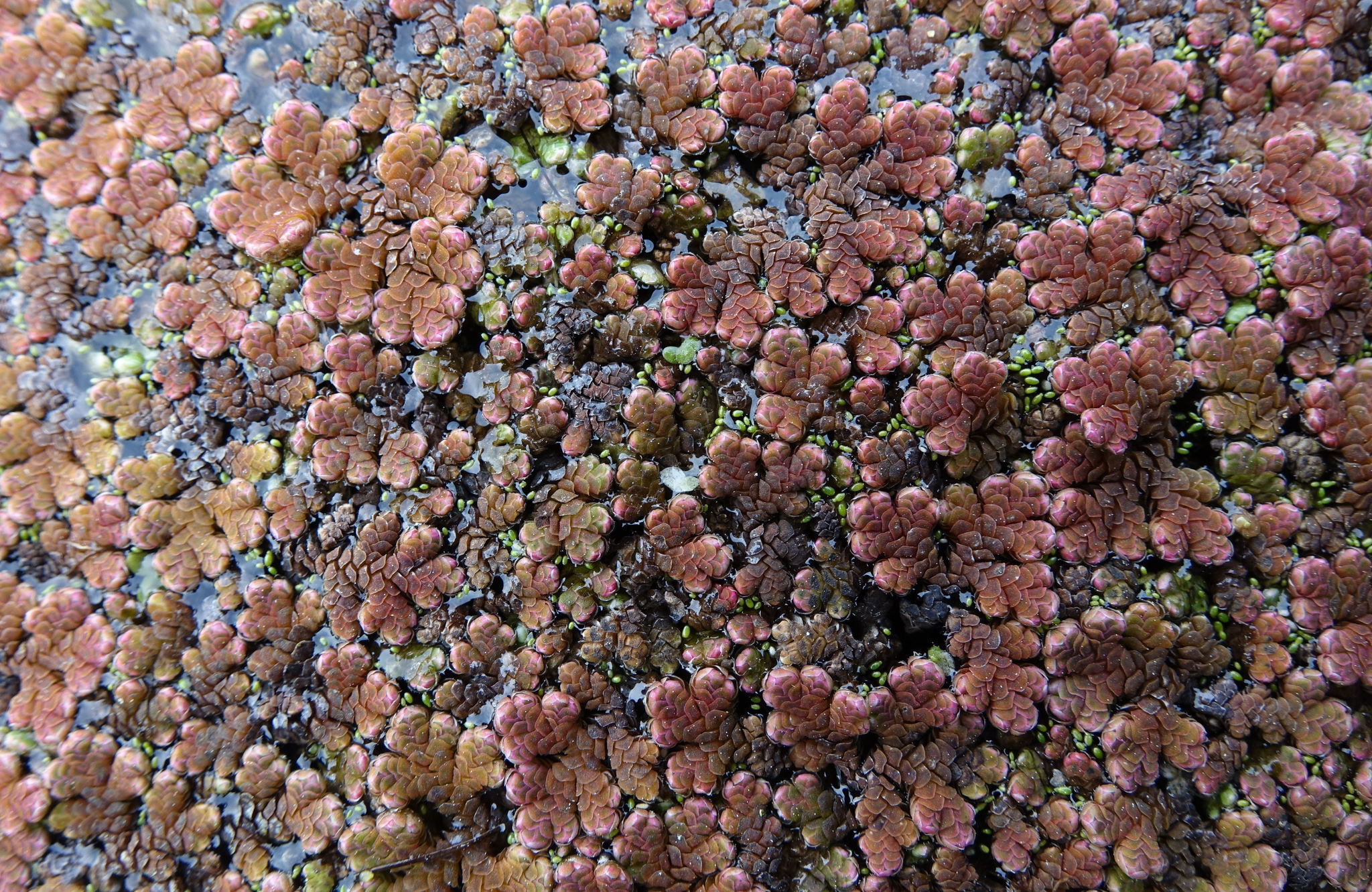

Scientific classification
- Kingdom: Plantae
- Clade: Tracheophytes
- Division: Polypodiophyta
- Class: Polypodiopsida
- Order: Salviniales
- Family: Salviniaceae
- Genus: Azolla
- Species: A. rubra

Binomial name
- Azolla rubra R.Br.

= Azolla rubra =

Species of fern

Azolla rubra, known commonly as red azolla and Pacific azolla, is a species of aquatic fern native to Australia and New Zealand. In New Zealand, it is also known by its Māori names returetu, roturotu, kārearea and kārerarera.

== Distribution ==
Azolla rubra is found in Australia and New Zealand. Its range is thought to extend to Papua New Guinea, Indonesia and Japan.

In New Zealand, it is found on the North and South Islands, and on Raoul Island in the Kermadecs.

== Habitat ==
Forms extensive red mats on slow moving bodies of water such as streams, lakes, ponds and swamps. May also occur on man-made water bodies such as farm ponds, drains, ditches, dams and cattle troughs.
