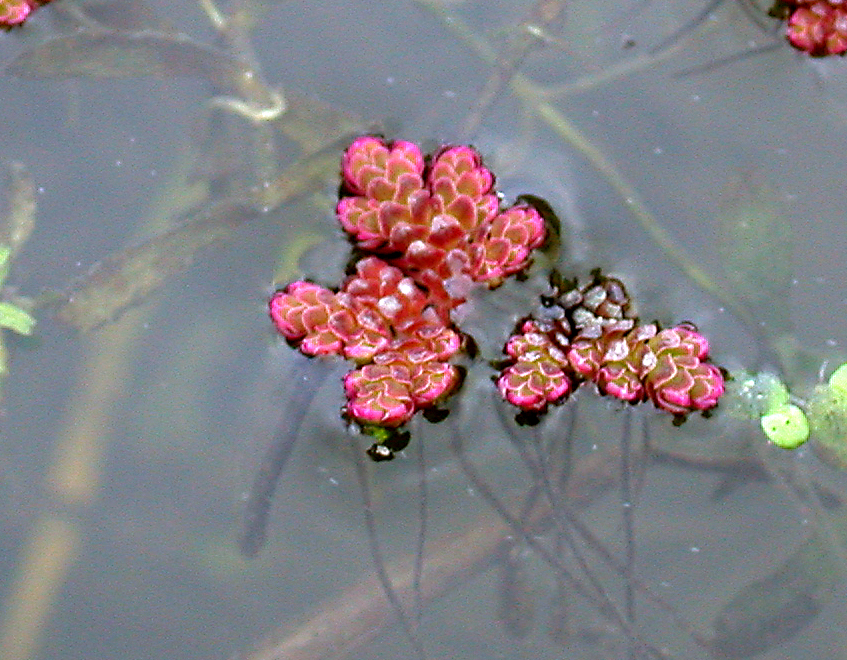

Conservation status
- Secure (NatureServe)

Scientific classification
- Kingdom: Plantae
- Clade: Tracheophytes
- Division: Polypodiophyta
- Class: Polypodiopsida
- Order: Salviniales
- Family: Salviniaceae
- Genus: Azolla
- Species: A. filiculoides

Binomial name
- Azolla filiculoides Lam.

Synonyms
- Azolla arbuscula Desv.; Azolla caroliniana Willd.; Azolla japonica Franch. & Sav.; Azolla magellanica Willd.; Azolla microphylla Kaulf.; Azolla pinnata var. japonica (Franch. & Sav.) Franch. & Sav.; Azolla squamosa Molina

= Azolla filiculoides =

Species of plant

Azolla filiculoides (water fern) is a species of aquatic fern. It is native to warm temperate and tropical regions of the Americas, and has been introduced to Europe, North and sub-Saharan Africa, China, Japan, New Zealand, the Caribbean, and Hawaii.

It is a floating aquatic fern with very fast growth, capable of spreading over the surfaces of lakes to give complete coverage of the water in only a few months. Each individual plant is 1–2 cm across, green tinged pink, orange, or red at the edges, branching freely, and breaking into smaller sections as it grows. It is not tolerant of cold temperatures; in temperate regions it largely dies back in winter, surviving by means of submerged buds. It harbors the diazotrophic organism Anabaena azollae in specialized leaf pockets. This ancient symbiosis allows A. azollae to fix nitrogen from the air and contribute to the fern's metabolism.

Fossil records from as recent as the last interglacials are known from several locations in Europe (Hyde et al. 1978). 50 million years ago, a species similar to A. filiculoides may have played a pivotal role in cooling the planet in what is known as the Azolla event.

A. filiculoides was one of the first two fern species with a reference genome published.

== Identification ==
The only sure method of distinguishing this species from A. cristata (long incorrectly known as A. caroliniana) is to examine the trichomes on the upper surfaces of the leaves. Trichomes are small protuberances that create water resistance. They are unicellular in A. filiculoides but septate (two-celled) in A. cristata.

== Cultivation ==
The species has been introduced to many regions of the Old World, grown for its nitrogen-fixing ability that may be used to enhance the growth rate of crops grown in water, such as rice, or by removal from lakes for use as green manure. A. filiculoides is frequently cultivated in aquariums and ponds, where it can become easily dominant over other species.

== Invasive species ==
A. filiculoides was first recorded in Europe in 1870s–1880s, when the species may have been accidentally transported in ballast water, with fry, or directly as an ornamental or aquarium plant. It was introduced into Asia from East Germany in 1977 as an alternative to the cold susceptible native strain of A. pinnata, used as a green manure in the rice industry. A. filiculoides has also been spread around the world as a research model plant for the study of Azolla–Anabaena symbiosis. In the areas of introduction, A. filiculoides is capable of rapid growth, especially in eutrophic ecosystems, and outcompetes native aquatic plants. The dense mat of A. filiculoides causes lack of light penetration and an anaerobic environment due to detritus decomposition, causing a drastic reduction of water quality, aquatic biodiversity, and ecosystem function.

== See also ==
- Azolla event

== Gallery ==
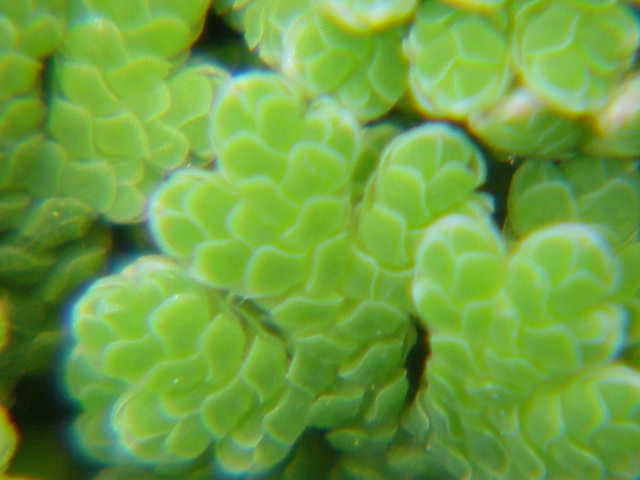
Close-up of a leaf

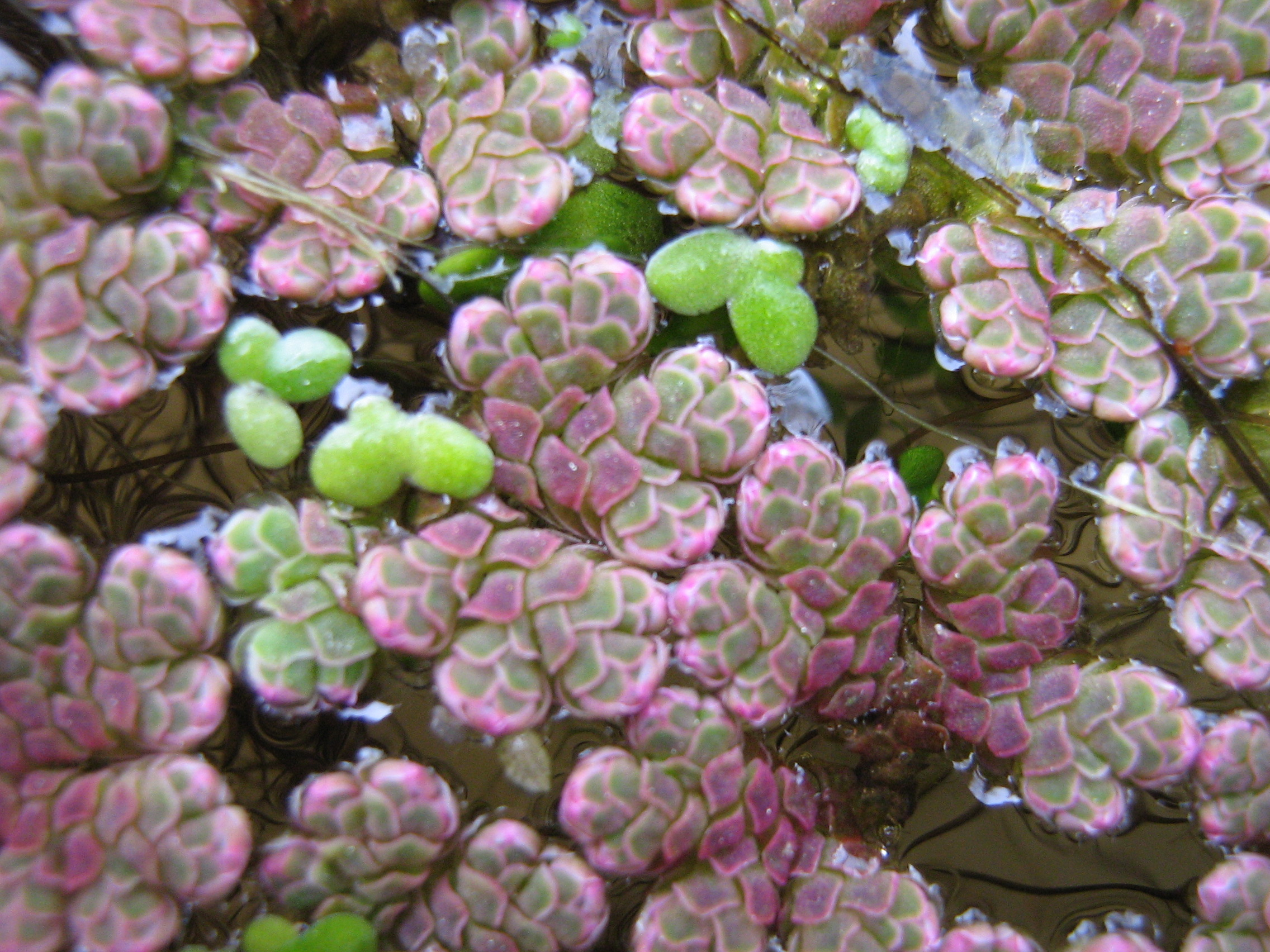
A. filiculoides (pink-tinged) with Lemna minor

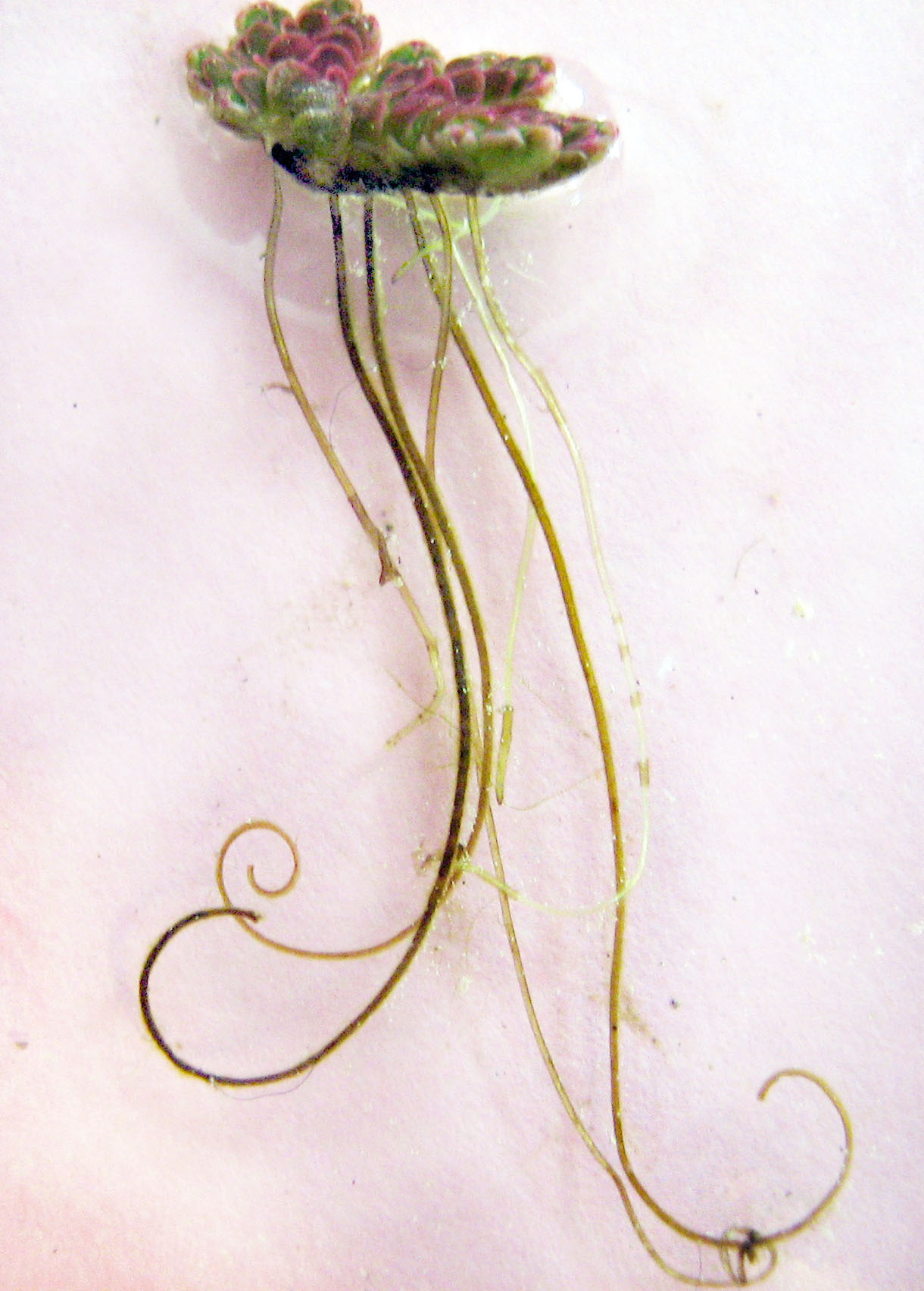
Single A. filiculoides plant showing the roots
