= Koelreuteria arnoldi =

Scientific classification
- Kingdom: Plantae
- Clade: Tracheophytes
- Clade: Angiosperms
- Clade: Eudicots
- Clade: Rosids
- Order: Sapindales
- Family: Sapindaceae
- Genus: Koelreuteria
- Species: †K. arnoldi

Binomial name
- †Koelreuteria arnoldi Becker 1957

Extinct species of flowering plant

Koelreuteria arnoldii is an extinct species of flowering plant in the family Sapindaceae. It is known from fossil fruits found in Early to Middle Eocene deposits of northern North America, primarily in the Okanagan Highlands of British Columbia and Washington, as well as Oligocene sites in Montana.

== Taxonomy ==
The species was first described by Herman F. Becker in 1961 from fossil capsular valves collected in the Oligocene deposits of the Upper Ruby River Basin in southwestern Montana. Becker named it Koelreuteria arnoldii, honoring the Arnold Arboretum of Harvard University. Hypotypes are housed at the Museum of Paleontology, University of California, Berkeley (UCMP 9301) and the Burke Museum of Natural History and Culture, University of Washington (UWBM 39189 & 39190).Subsequent studies have questioned its assignment to Koelreuteria. In a 2013 review of Cenozoic Koelreuteria fruits, Wang et al. noted that the small, flat capsular valves of K. arnoldii differ from the inflated capsules typical of modern Koelreuteria species and show greater affinity to Boniodendron, an extant genus in the same family native to southern China and Vietnam.
