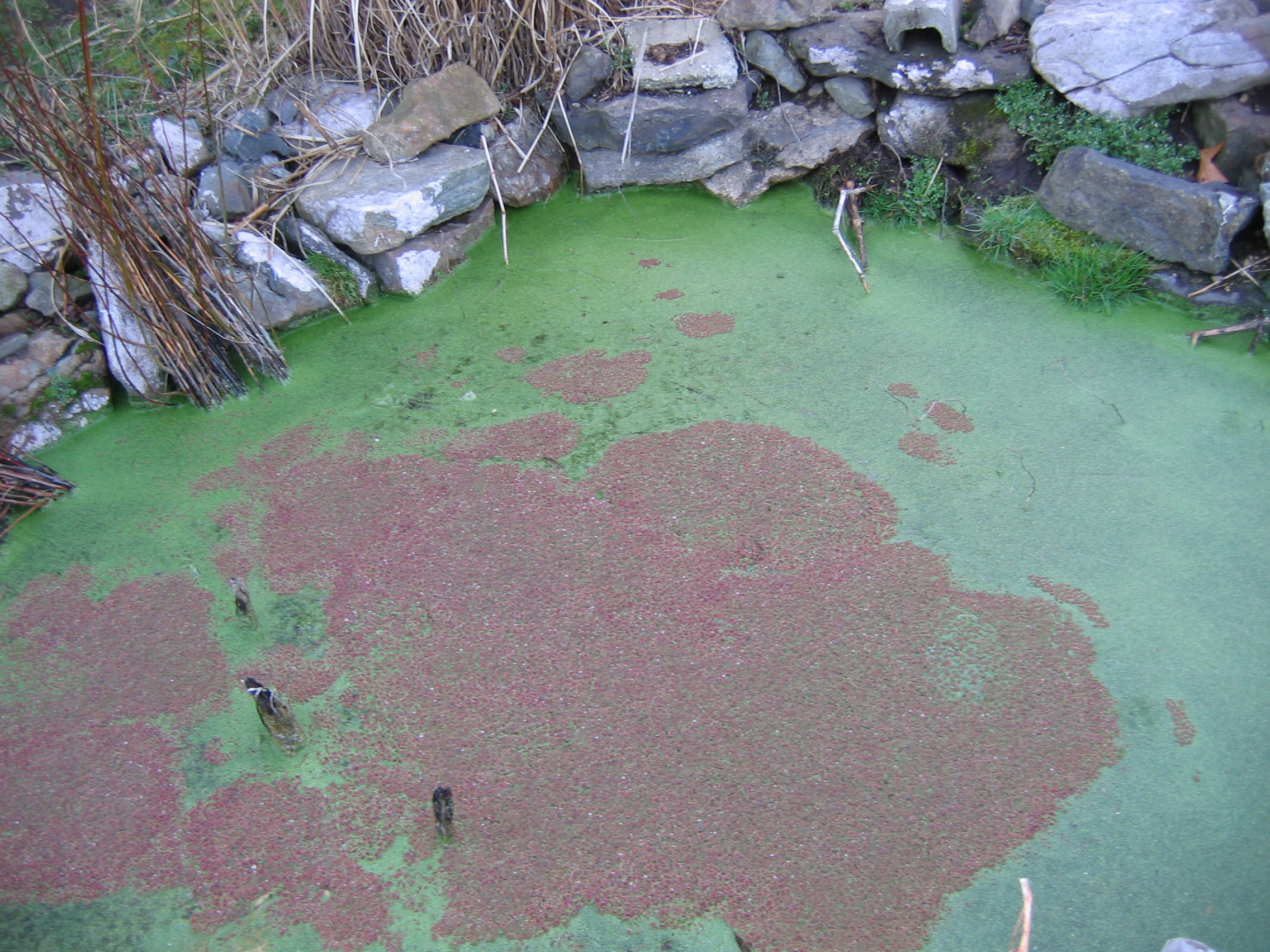
- Azolla cristata (reddish) and Lemna (green) in a small pool

Conservation status
- Secure (NatureServe)

Scientific classification
- Kingdom: Plantae
- Clade: Tracheophytes
- Division: Polypodiophyta
- Class: Polypodiopsida
- Order: Salviniales
- Family: Salviniaceae
- Genus: Azolla
- Species: A. cristata

Binomial name
- Azolla cristata Kaulf.

Synonyms
- Synonyms of A. cristata include: Azolla mexicana Schlecht. & Cham.; Azolla portoricensis Spreng.; Azolla microphylla Kaulf.; Azolla densa Desv.; Azolla bonariensis Bertol.; Salvinia azolla Raddi

= Azolla cristata =

Species of aquatic plant

Azolla cristata, the Carolina mosquito fern, Carolina azolla, or water velvet, is a species of the Azolla genus native to the Americas, in eastern North America from southern Ontario southward, from the east coast west to Wisconsin and Texas, the Caribbean, and in Central and South America from southeastern Mexico (Chiapas) south to northern Argentina and Uruguay.

It is a freshwater aquatic fern, with scale-like fronds 5–10 mm long, green to reddish, most often reddish in winter and in strong light. They are covered in tiny trichomes that give it the appearance of velvet. It is able to fix nitrogen from the air by means of symbiotic cyanobacteria. It can survive winter water temperatures of 5 °C (41 °F), with optimum summer growth between 25–30 °C (77–86 °F).

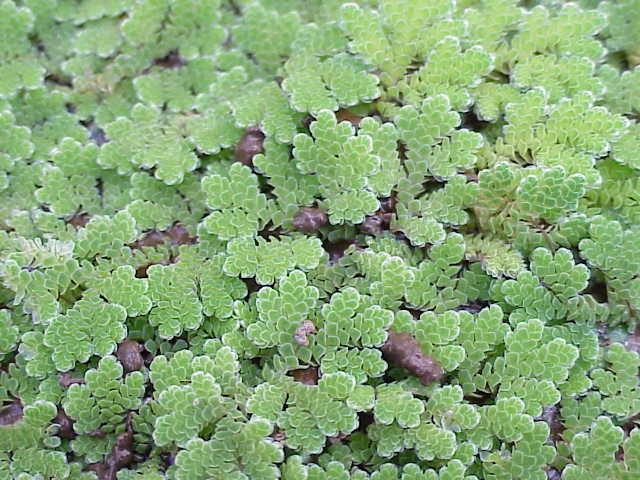
Frond detail

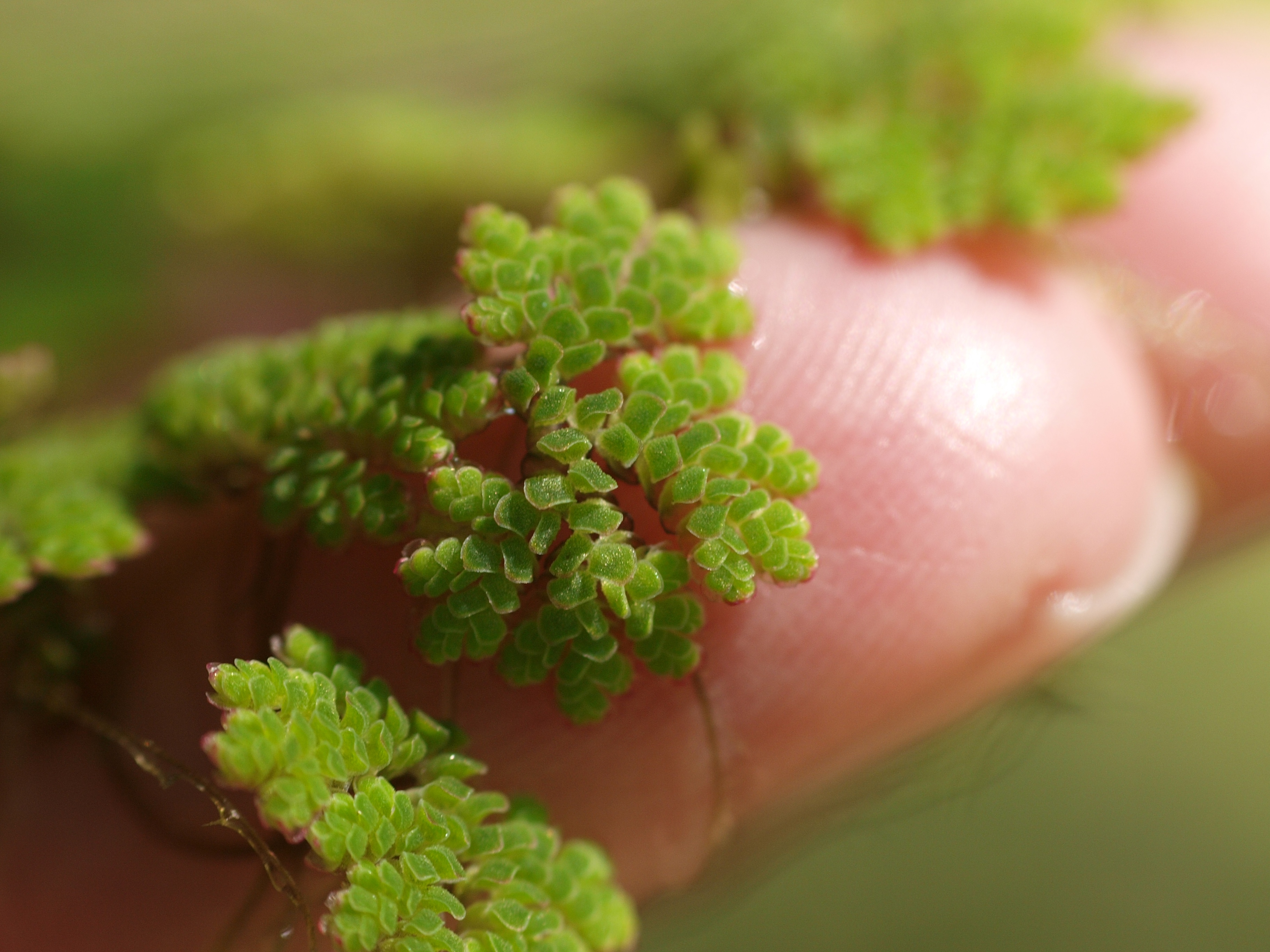
Azolla cristata at Jack London State Historic Park

== Identification ==
Distinguishing this species from Azolla filiculoides involves examining the trichomes (small bumps that create water resistance) on the upper surfaces of the leaves. They are unicellular in A. filiculoides but septate (two-celled) in A. cristata.

== Name ==
This species has erroneously been known under the name Azolla caroliniana. However, research by Evrard and Van Hove found that the type specimen of A. caroliniana actually consists of plants of Azolla filiculoides and so the name caroliniana has been improperly applied to this species.

== Cultivation and uses ==
A. cristata is of commercial importance in cultivation in southern and eastern Asia as a biofertilizer, valued for its nitrogen-fixing ability, which benefits crops such as rice when the fern is grown under it and reduces the need for artificial fertilizer. The thick mat of fronds (up to 4 cm thick) also suppresses weed growth. Harvested fronds are also used as a food for fish and poultry. It is also often used as a floating plant in both coldwater and tropical aquaria, as well as in outdoor ponds; it is propagated by division.
