= Acid Blue 25 =

Names
- Preferred IUPAC name Sodium 1-amino-4-anilino-9,10-dioxo-9,10-dihydroanthracene-2-sulfonate
- Other names 2-Anthraquinonesulfonic acid, Acid Blue 25

Identifiers
CAS Number	6408-78-2
3D model (JSmol)	Interactive image
ChEBI	CHEBI:538892
ChemSpider	21462
ECHA InfoCard	100.026.426
EC Number	229-068-1
PubChem CID	23675622
UNII	S2E15W6FSN
CompTox Dashboard (EPA)	DTXSID2044711
- InChI: InChI=1S/C20H14N2O5S.Na/c21-18-15(28(25,26)27)10-14(22-11-6-2-1-3-7-11)16-17(18)20(24)13-9-5-4-8-12(13)19(16)23;/h1-10,22H,21H2,(H,25,26,27);/q;+1/p-1 Key: LIKZXCROQGHXTI-UHFFFAOYSA-M
- SMILES: C1=CC=C(C=C1)NC2=CC(=C(C3=C2C(=O)C4=CC=CC=C4C3=O)N)S(=O)(=O)[O-].[Na+]

Properties
Chemical formula	C_{20}H_{13}N_{2}NaO_{5}S
Molar mass	416.38 g·mol^{−1}
- Except where otherwise noted, data are given for materials in their standard state (at 25 °C [77 °F], 100 kPa). Infobox references

Acid Blue 25 (C_{20}H_{13}N_{2}NaO_{5}S) is an acid dye that is water-soluble and anionic and used for adsorption research. The structure is an anthraquinone.

== Properties and applications ==
Acid Blue 25 is powder-like and poorly soluble in water. The dye is soluble in solvents such as acetone and ethanol.

== Use ==
Acid Blue 25 is used for dyeing wool, silk and mixed fabric and printing them in a direct method.

The dye is extensively utilized to color leather, paper, cellulose, and PC blends during the manufacturing process.

The hue of acid Blue 25 is close to dark blue.
