= David P. Penhallow =

American paleontologist

David Pearce Penhallow
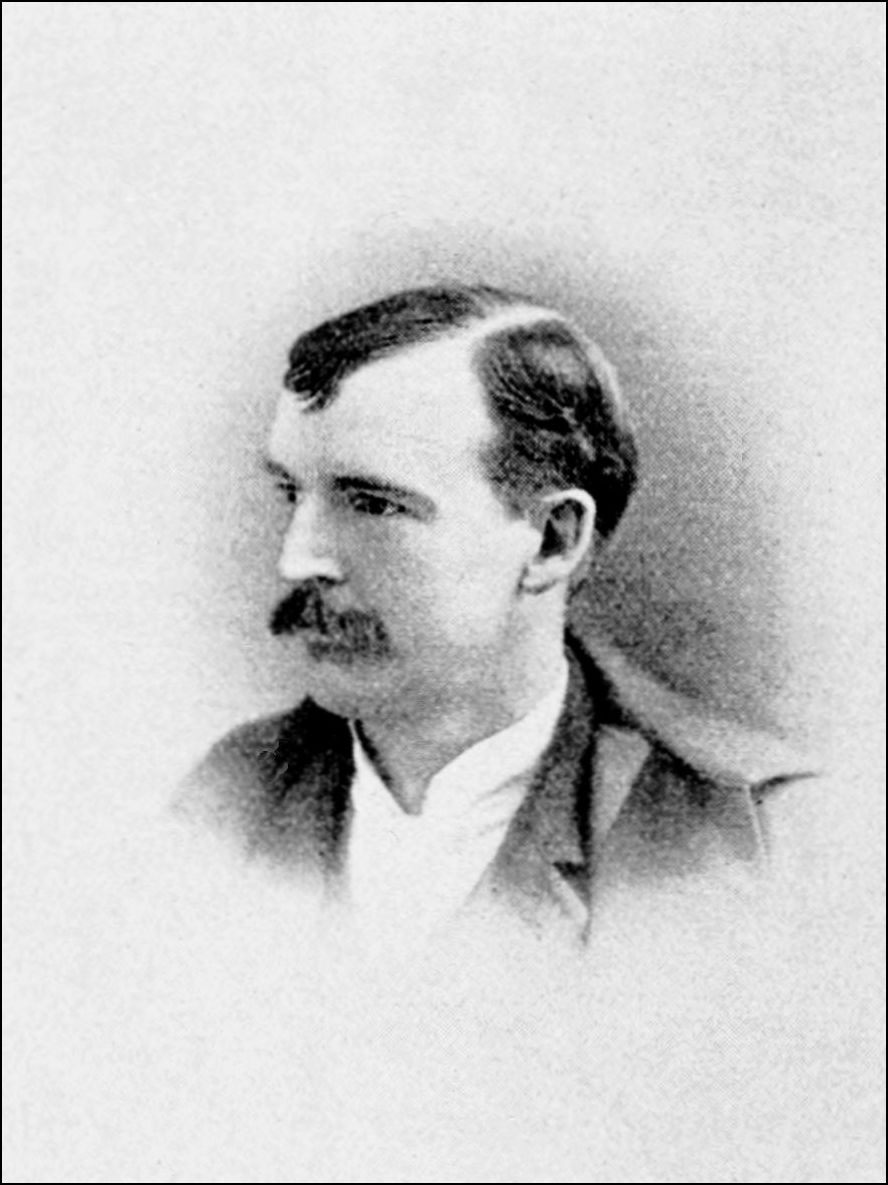
- Born: May 25, 1854; Kittery Point, Maine (United States)
- Died: October 20, 1910 (aged 56); S.S. Lake Manitoba North Atlantic
- Education: Massachusetts Agricultural College
- Known for: Botany and Paleobotany
- Scientific career
- Fields: Botany (Paleobotany)
- Workplaces: McGill University, Montreal Canada

David Pearce Penhallow (25 May 1854 – 20 October 1910) was a Canadian-American botanist, paleobotanist and educator.

Born in Kittery Point, Maine, Penhallow graduated from Massachusetts Agricultural College in 1873 (now the University of Massachusetts Amherst). When his former professor William S. Clark was asked by the Japanese government to assist in the founding of Sapporo Agricultural College (now Hokkaido University), Penhallow accompanied Clark and another MAC graduate, William Wheeler, to teach botany and chemistry. When Clark departed the Sapporo in 1877, Penhallow served as acting president from 1879 to 1880. During his stay in Japan, Penhallow travelled across the archipelago and among other accomplishments became the first westerner to stay with the Ainu peoples.

Upon returning to North America in 1880, Penhallow became an assistant to noted Harvard University botanist Asa Gray and assisted with Gray's research into the distribution of northern hemisphere plants. Penhallow left Harvard in 1882 to become a botanist and chemist at the Houghton Farm Experiment Station which was located in Houghton, New York, however the station closed only one year later. While Penhallow was working at Houghton Farm, Gray was contacted by Sr John Dawson of McGill University who was looking for a suitable person to fill the vacancy left at McGill with the death of botanist James Barnston. Penhallow accepted and became a lecturer at McGill and in 1883 became the first botanist appointed to the Macdonald Chair of Botany. During this time Penhallow delved into the newly developing science of paleobotany with the encouragement of Dawson. He was noted for his early work on Devonian fossils of the Gaspé Peninsula and the Tertiary fossils of the British Columbian coal fields. He conducted detailed work on extinct taxa such as Prototaxites and Azolla primaeva.

Penhallow continued with his education and in 1888 he earned his BS from Boston University. Eight years later in 1896 he was awarded both a BS and an MS from McGill 1896, and finally a DS in 1904. After allegedly suffering from a mental breakdown in 1909, Penhallow died on the SS Lake Manitoba during a voyage from Montreal to Liverpool, England.
