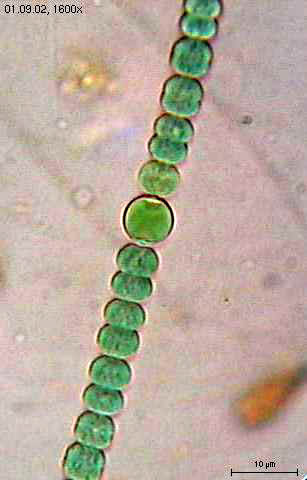
- Anabaena sphaerica

Scientific classification
- Domain: Bacteria
- Kingdom: Bacillati
- Phylum: Cyanobacteriota
- Class: Cyanophyceae
- Order: Nostocales
- Family: Nostocaceae
- Genus: Anabaena; Bory de Saint-Vincent ex Bornet & Flahault, 1886

Species
- See text

= Anabaena =

Genus of bacteria

Anabaena is a genus of filamentous cyanobacteria that exist as plankton. They are known for nitrogen-fixing abilities, and they form symbiotic relationships with certain plants, such as the mosquito fern. They are one of four genera of cyanobacteria that produce neurotoxins, which are harmful to local wildlife, as well as farm animals and pets. Production of these neurotoxins is assumed to be an input into its symbiotic relationships, protecting the plant from grazing pressure.

A DNA sequencing project was undertaken by the United States Department of Energy between 1999 and 2005. This project mapped the complete genome of model organism Anabaena variabilis ATCC 29413, which is 7.2 million base pairs long. A paper detailing the process was published in 2014. The study focused on heterocysts, which convert nitrogen into ammonia. Certain species of Anabaena have been used on rice paddy fields, proving to be an effective natural fertilizer.

== Species ==
List of current (C), unverified (U), and preliminary (P) species from AlgaeBase:

- An. abnormis Proskina-Lavrenko, 1968 C
- An. aequalis O.Borge, 1906 C
- An. aerophila Brabez, 1941 C
- An. aeruginosa N.L.Gardner, 1927 C
- An. alatospora Gonzalvez & Kamat, 1959 C
- An. allahabadii A.K.Mitra, 1951 C
- An. allantospora Montagne, 1846 U
- An. anisococca Migula, 1905 C
- An. arenicola (Kützing) Trevisan, 1845 U
- An. aspera Frémy, 1930 C
- An. attenuata Kisselev, 1940 C
- An. augstumalis Schmidle, 1900 C
- An. australica Playfair, 1918 C
- An. austroafricana Cronberg & Komárek, 2004 C
- An. azotica Ley, 1959 C
- An. batophora Frémy, 1930 C
- An. beckii G.De Toni, 1935 C
- An. bederi Seckt C
- An. belmontica C.G.M.Archibald, 1967 C
- An. berkeleyana Batters, 1902 C
- An. bernardinensis Chodat & Zender, 1924 C
- An. bharadwajae B.N.Prasad, 1951 U
- An. bispora Gayral & Mazancourt, 1958 U
- An. bolochonceviana Woronichin, 1931 C
- An. bolochonzewii K.I.Meyer, 1926 C
- An. bonariensis Seckt, 1922 C
- An. borealis E.Larsen, 1907 U
- An. bornetiana Collins, 1896 C
- An. brevis Kützing, 1845 U
- An. broomei Batters, 1891 C
- An. calida Kützing, 1849 U
- An. carmichaelii Cronberg & Komárek, 2004 C
- An. catenula Kützing ex Bornet & Flahault, 1886 C
- An. cavanillesiana P.González, 1946 C
- An. chilensis Montagne, 1854 U
- An. codiicola Feldmann, 1954 C
- An. confervoides Reinsch ex De Toni, 1897 U
- An. conglobata (Kützing) Trevisan, 1845 U
- An. contorta H.Bachmann, 1921 C
- An. crispa Roemer, 1845 U
- An. cupressaphila Wolle, 1887 C
- An. cuticularis Brébisson ex Kützing, 1949 U
- An. cyanea (Kützing) Trevisan, 1845 U
- An. cylindracea N.L.Gardner, 1927 C
- An. cylindrica Lemmermann, 1896 C
- An. cylindrospora Tschernov, 1950 C
- An. debilis Kützing, 1849 U
- An. delicatissima N.L.Gardner, 1927 C
- An. discoidea (Schmidle) Ostenfeld, 1908 C
- An. distans Kützing, 1849 U
- An. duplooyae H.Welsh, 1965 C
- An. echinospora Skuja, 1926 C
- An. effusa (Kützing) Trevisan, 1845 U
- An. elegans Sant'Anna, 1991 C
- An. ellipsoidea (Compère) Komárek, 2012 C
- An. elliptica Lemmermann, 1898 C
- An. elongata Prescott, 1965 C
- An. endogena Rabenhorst, 1865 U
- An. epiphytica N.L.Gardner, 1927 C
- An. epiphytica Huber-Pestalozzi, 1930 C
- An. felisii Bornet & Flahault, 1886 C
- An. fragilis Meneghini, 1837 U
- An. fullebornii Schmidle, 1902 C
- An. fuscovaginata Mareš, 2010 C
- An. galpinii Claassen, 1961 C
- An. geitleri De Toni, 1934 C
- An. gelatinosa Reinsch, 1866 U
- An. gerdii E.J.Carpenter & Janson, 2001 C
- An. ghosei H.Welsh, 1964 C
- An. gigantea H.C.Wood ex Wolle, 1887 U
- An. glauca Schmidle, 1901 C
- An. gracilis Messikommer, 1956 C
- An. granularis Nägeli ex Kützing, 1849 U
- An. gregaria Zakrzewski, 1934 C
- An. groenlandica H.Bachmann, 1921 C
- An. hatueyi Komárek, 1988 C
- An. hederulae Kützing, 1849 U
- An. hieronymusii Lemmermann, 1898 C
- An. hispida Gayral, 1954 C
- An. hollerbachii Obukhova [Obuchova], 1959 C
- An. huberi De Toni, 1934 C
- An. humicola Bortels, 1940 C
- An. hunanensis C.-C.Jao, 1940 C
- An. hyalina Schmidle, 1901 C
- An. impalpabilis Bory ex Bornet & Flahault, 1888 C
- An. imperceptibilis (Bory) Trevisan, 1845 U
- An. inaequalis Bornet & Flahault, 1886 C
- An. incerta P.J.L.Dangeard, 1949 C
- An. incognita H.Welsh, 1964 C
- An. incurva (G.J.Allmann) Trevisan, 1845 U
- An. indica Tiwari & Pandey, 1976 U
- An. indica Zeller ex Bornet & Flahault, 1886 C
- An. involuta Reinsch, 1876 U
- An. irregularis I.F.Lewis, C.Zirkle & R.Patrick, 1933 C
- An. iyengarii Bharadwaja, 1935 C
- An. jaubertiana Montagne, 1859 U
- An. jeejiae Komárek, 2005 C
- An. jonssonii J.B.Petersen, 1923 C
- An. karakumica Kogan, 1967 C
- An. kemptii V.Das & Mitra, 1974 U
- An. kisselevii Proshkina-Lavrenko, 1968 C
- An. koreana H.S.Kim, 2013 U
- An. kwangtungensis S.-H.Ley, 1947 C
- An. lapponica O.Borge, 1913 C
- An. laxa A.Braun, 1886 C
- An. leonardii Compère, 1967 C
- An. levanderi Lemmermann, 1907 C
- An. licheniformis Bory, 1822 U
- An. lohammarii Skuja, 1956 C
- An. luteola Schmidle, 1901 C
- An. manchurica Skvortzov, 1937 C
- An. marina N.L.Gardner, 1932 C
- An. maritima P.Crouan & H.Crouan, 1867 U
- An. marklei J.Copeland, 1936 C
- An. mediocris N.L.Gardner, 1927 C
- An. mehrai Vasishta, 1961 C
- An. mesiana Claassen, 1961 C
- An. microscopica Kützing, 1849 U
- An. minderi Huber-Pestalozzi, 1938 C
- An. miniata Skuja, 1956 C
- An. minima Tschernov, 1950 C
- An. minuta Borzì, 1892 C
- An. minutissima Lemmermann, 1898 C
- An. monilifera Frémy, 1945 C
- An. moniliformis Migula, 1905 U
- An. monticulosa Bory ex Bornet & Flahault, 1888 U
- An. multispora P.J.L.Dangeard, 1949 C
- An. neapolitana Kützing, 1843 U
- An. nodularia Kützing, 1843 U
- An. nodularioides Geitler & Ruttner, 1936 C
- An. novizelandica Skuja, 1976 C
- An. oblonga De Wildeman, 1897 C
- An. obsoleta Kützing, 1849 U
- An. orientalis S.C.Dixit, 1936 C
- An. orthogona West, 1892 C
- An. oscillarioides Bory ex Bornet & Flahault, 1886 C
- An. papillosa Hirano, 1969 C
- An. passeriniana De Notaris, 1866 U
- An. paulseniana J.B.Petersen, 1923 C
- An. pintoi González Guerrero, 1950 C
- An. pirinica Petkoff, 1925 C
- An. poulseniana J.B.Petersen, 1923 C
- An. promecespora Frémy, 1930 C
- An. pseudocatenula Claassen, 1961 C
- An. pseudoconstricta Cholnoky, 1955 C
- An. pulchra Morren, 1835 U
- An. punctata Kützing, 1843 U
- An. ralfsii (Kützing) Cooke, 1884 C
- An. ramakaranae Bharadwaja, 1963 C
- An. raytonensis Cholnoky, 1955 C
- An. recta Geitler & Ruttner, 1936 C
- An. recta (Kützing) Trevisan, 1845 U
- An. repens Behre, 1956 C
- An. rhodopensis I.K.Kirjakov & K.N.Velichkova, 2016 U
- An. riparia (Kützing) Trevisan, 1845 U
- An. robusta Kogan & Yazkuleva [Jazkulijeva], 1970 C
- An. rudis Meneghini, 1837 U
- An. saaremaaensis Skuja, 1930 C
- An. sabulosa (Kützing) Trevisan, 1845 U
- An. salina Alten, 1913 C
- An. salina B.Liebetanz, 1925 U
- An. scabra G.Dickie, 1880 U
- An. schauderi H.Welsh, 1961 C
- An. sedowii Kossinskaja, 1933 C
- An. shankargarhii A.K.Varma, 1976 C
- An. shensiensis C.-C.Jao, 1948 C
- An. smaragdina Soubeiran, 1858 U
- An. solicola N.V.Kondrateva, 1959 C
- An. sphaerica Bornet & Flahault, 1886 C
- An. sphagnicola Tarnavschi & Mitroiu, 1956 C
- An. spinosa Laloraya & Mitra, 1971 C
- An. stillicidiorum Borzì, 1878 U
- An. subdelicatula C.-C.Jao, 1940 C
- An. subperanema Bolochonzew, 1911 U
- An. subrigida De Toni U
- An. subtilissima Kützing, 1843 U
- An. subvariabilis R.E.M.Archibald, 1967 C
- An. swakopensis Molinari & Guiry, 2021 C
- An. tatarica Kossinskaja, 1951 C
- An. tenax Hooker f. & Harvey, 1847 U
- An. tenuis Messikommer, 1956 C
- An. tenuis Meneghini, 1837 U
- An. terrestris Bory, 1827 U
- An. thermophila G.H.Schwabe, 1947 C
- An. thwaitesii (Harvey) P.Crouan & H.Crouan, 1867 U
- An. toruloides C.G.M.Archibald, 1967 C
- An. torulosa Lagerheim ex Bornet & Flahault, 1886 C
- An. tschujskaja Obukhova, 1965 C
- An. tsugarensis M.Watanabe, 2006 C
- An. turkestanica (Kisselev) Komárek, 2005 C
- An. tuzsonii Halász, 1936 C
- An. vaucheriae C.-C.Jao, 1948 C
- An. verrucosa J.B.Petersen, 1923 C
- An. vialis Kützing, 1845 U
- An. voukii G.De Toni, 1836 U
- An. wallumensis G.B.McGregor, 2018 C
- An. welshii Molinari & Guiry, 2021 C
- An. westii Virieux, 1913 C
- An. willei N.L.Gardner, 1927 C
- An. wisconsinensis Prescott, 1944 C
- An. woodii G.De Toni, 1934 C
- An. yunnanensis L.C.Li, 1939 null

List of synonimized species from AlgaeBase:

- An. affinis Lemmermann, 1898 S →
- An. akankoensis M.Watanabe, 2003 S →
- An. ambigua C.B.Rao, 1937 S →
- An. anisococca (Sprengel) Trevisan, 1845 S →
- An. anomala F.E.Fritsch, 1949 S →
- An. antarctica F.E.Fritsch, 1912 S →
- An. aphanizomenoides Forti, 1911 S →
- An. arctica Kisselev, 1932 S →
- An. azollae Strasburger, 1884 S → Trichormus azollae
- An. ballygungii Banerji, 1938 S →
- An. baltica Johs.Schmidt, 1899 S →
- An. berezowskii Usačev, 1928 S →
- An. bergii Ostenfeld, 1908 S →
- An. bituri Cronberg & Komárek, 2004 S →
- An. bothae H.Welsh, 1961 S →
- An. botulus Margalef, 1951 S →
- An. bullosa Kützing, 1843 S →
- An. calcicola C.Agardh ex Fries, 1835 S →
- An. californica O.Borge, 1909 S →
- An. caspica Ostenfeld, 1901 S →
- An. chalybea Kützing, 1843 S →
- An. circinalis Rabenhorst ex Bornet & Flahault, 1886 S →
- An. circularis Wołoszyńska, 1912 S →
- An. citrispora M.Watanabe, 1992 S →
- An. compacta (Kützing) Trevisan, 1845 S →
- An. compacta (Nygaard) Hickel, 1985 S →
- An. constricta (Szafer) Geitler, 1925 S →
- An. crassa (Lemmermann) Komárková-Legnová & Cronberg, 1992 S →
- An. curva H.Hill, 1976 S →
- An. cycadearum Reinke ex Tilden, 1897 S →
- An. cylindrospermoides Subba Raju, 1962 S →
- An. cylindrospora H.Welsh, 1965 S →
- An. danica (Nygaard) Komárková-Legnerová & Eloranta, 1992 S →
- An. decorticans (Dillwyn) Trevisan, 1848 S →
- An. delicatula Lemmermann, 1898 S →
- An. desikacharyensis Vasishta, 1961 S →
- An. doliolum Bharadwaja, 1935 S →
- An. ellipsoides Bolochoncev ex Woronichin, 1931 S →
- An. ellipsospora (F.E.Fritsch) Obuchova, 1959 S →
- An. eucompacta R.Li & M.Watanabe, 1999 S →
- An. fallax Komárek & Komárková-Legnerová, 2002 S →
- An. farciminiformis Cronberg & Komárek-Legnerová, 1988 S →
- An. fertilissima C.B.Rao, 1937 S →
- An. flos-aquae Brébisson ex Bornet & Flauhault, 1886 S →
- An. fragilis Meneghini, 1837 S →
- An. fuellebornii Schmidle, 1903 S →
- An. fusca H.Hill, 1976 S →
- An. gelatinicola Ghose, 1924 S →
- An. gelatinosa H.D.Wood, 1869 S →
- An. gelatinosa F.E.Fritsch, 1939 S →
- An. globosa M.Hirano, 1963 S →
- An. halbfassii H.Bachmann, 1913 S →
- An. hallensis Bornet & Flahault, 1886 S →
- An. hansgirgii Schmidle, 1900 S →
- An. hassallii Wittrock ex Lemmermann, 1907 S →
- An. helicoidea C.Bernard, 1908 S →
- An. heterospora Nygaard, 1949 S →
- An. hoshiarpurensis Vasishta, 1960 S →
- An. humicola Trevisan, 1845 S →
- An. impalpabilis Bory, 1822 S →
- An. impalpebralis Bory ex Bornet & Flahault, 1888 S →
- An. impalpebralis Bory ex Hassall, 1845 S →
- An. incrassata Nygaard, 1929 S →
- An. indica G.Beck, 1897 S →
- An. infusionum Kützing, 1849 S →
- An. intricata (Berkeley) Kützing, 1845 S →
- An. isocystoides H.Welsh, 1964 S →
- An. issatschenkoi Usachev, 1938 S →
- An. jacutica Kisselev, 1932 S →
- An. kashiensis Bharadwaja, 1935 S →
- An. khannae Skuja, 1949 S →
- An. kisseleviana Elenkin, 1938 S →
- An. knipowitschii Usachev, 1927 S →
- An. lemmermannii P.G.Richter, 1903 S →
- An. limicola A.Roemer, 1845 S →
- An. limicola Trevisan, 1845 S →
- An. limnetica G.M.Smith, 1916 S →
- An. longicellularis (H.Pankow) Komárková-Legnerová & Eloranta, 1992 S →
- An. lutea N.L.Gardner, 1927 S →
- An. macrospora Klebahn, 1895 S →
- An. major (Kützing) Trevisan, 1845 S →
- An. manguinii (Bourrelly) Komárek, 2005 S →
- An. maxima Cronberg & Komárek, 2004 S →
- An. membranina Bory, 1822 S →
- An. mendotae W.Trelease, 1889 S →
- An. minispora M.Watanabe, 1998 S →
- An. minuta H.Welsh, 1964 S →
- An. mollis Kützing, 1849 S →
- An. mucosa Komárková-Legnerová & Eloranta, 1992 S →
- An. mysorensis Gonzalves & Kamat, 1959 S →
- An. nathii Vasishta, 1960 S →
- An. naviculoides F.E.Fritsch, 1949 S →
- An. nygaardii Cronberg & Komárek, 2004 S →
- An. oryzae F.E.Fritsch, 1949 S →
- An. oumiana M.Watanabe, 1996 S →
- An. parva P.J.Philson, 1939 S →
- An. perturbata H.Hill, 1976 S →
- An. planctonica Brunnthaler, 1903 S →
- An. polysperma (Kützing) Trevisan, 1845 S →
- An. polyspora (Tarnavschi & Mitroiu) Kondratiev, 1968 S →
- An. portoricensis N.L.Gardner, 1927 S →
- An. propinqua Setchell & N.L.Gardner, 1919 S →
- An. pseudocompacta M.Watanabe, 1996 S →
- An. pseudoscillatoria Bory, 1822 S →
- An. pseudovariabilis Woronichin [Voronichin], 1929 S →
- An. raciborskii Wołoszyńska, 1912 S →
- An. randhawae Venkataraman, 1958 S →
- An. reniformis Lemmermann, 1898 S →
- An. reverdattoana T.G.Popova & Degtereva, 1935 S →
- An. rufescens (C.Agardh) Kirchner, 1878 S →
- An. scheremetieviae Elenkin, 1909 S →
- An. siamensis Antarikanonda, 1985 S →
- An. sibirica Elenkin, 1938 S →
- An. sigmoidea Nygaard, 1950 S →
- An. skujaelaxum Komárek & Zapomělová, 2007 S →
- An. smithii (Komárek) M.Watanabe, 1992 S →
- An. solitaria Klebahn, 1895 S →
- An. spiralis Wm.Thompson, 1840 S →
- An. spiroides Klebahn, 1895 S →
- An. stagnalis Kützing, 1843 S →
- An. steloides L.Canabaeus, 1929 S →
- An. subcylindrica Borge, 1921 S →
- An. subtropica N.L.Gardner, 1927 S →
- An. tanganyikae G.S.West, 1907 S →
- An. tenericaulis Nygaard, 1950 S →
- An. tenuis Meneghini, 1837 S →
- An. thermalis Vouk, 1916 S →
- An. torquesreginae Komárek, 1984 S →
- An. ucrainica (Schkorbatow) M.Watanabe, 1996 S →
- An. unispora N.L.Gardner, 1927 S →
- An. utermoehlii Geitler, 1925 S →
- An. vaginicola F.E.Fritsch & Rich, 1930 S →
- An. variabilis Kützing ex Bornet & Flahault, 1886 S → Trichormus variabilis
- An. viguieri Denis & Frémy, 1924 S →
- An. volzii Lemmermann, 1905 S →
- An. werneri Brunnthaler, 1903 S →
- An. zinserlingii Kossinskaja, 1929 S →

=== Recent changes ===
The genus has significant overlap with Aphanizomenon. Despite An. variabilis having been removed from the genus to form a new Trichormus 1988, it seems to be phylogenetically placed in Anabaena (between the "planktic" main-group and the group formed by An. augstumalis and An. oscillarioides). As a result the position of T. variabilis and the two species of benthic Anabaena may be subject to change. The group around Trichormus variabilis is better-supported by data than grouping it together with main-group Anabaena/Aphanizomenon, so it's more likely for the two species to be split out. In addition, the position of Trichormus azollae needs change.

- In 2009, a 42-species group under the "planktic" main-group, determined by 16S rRNA or gas vesicle morphotype, were transferred to Dolichospermum.
- In 2010, the genus Sphaerospermopsis was created, moving away 3 species. 3 more were moved to this genus later.
- In 2012, 3 species were moved to the new genus Chrysosporum. One was later moved to Umezakia.

Many of sequenced the morphospecies in Anabaena, Dolichospermum, and Aphanizomenon (ADA clade) are not monophyletic. Work is underway to sequence more genomes from these genera to produce a species classification based on genetic branching.

== Nitrogen fixation by Anabaena ==
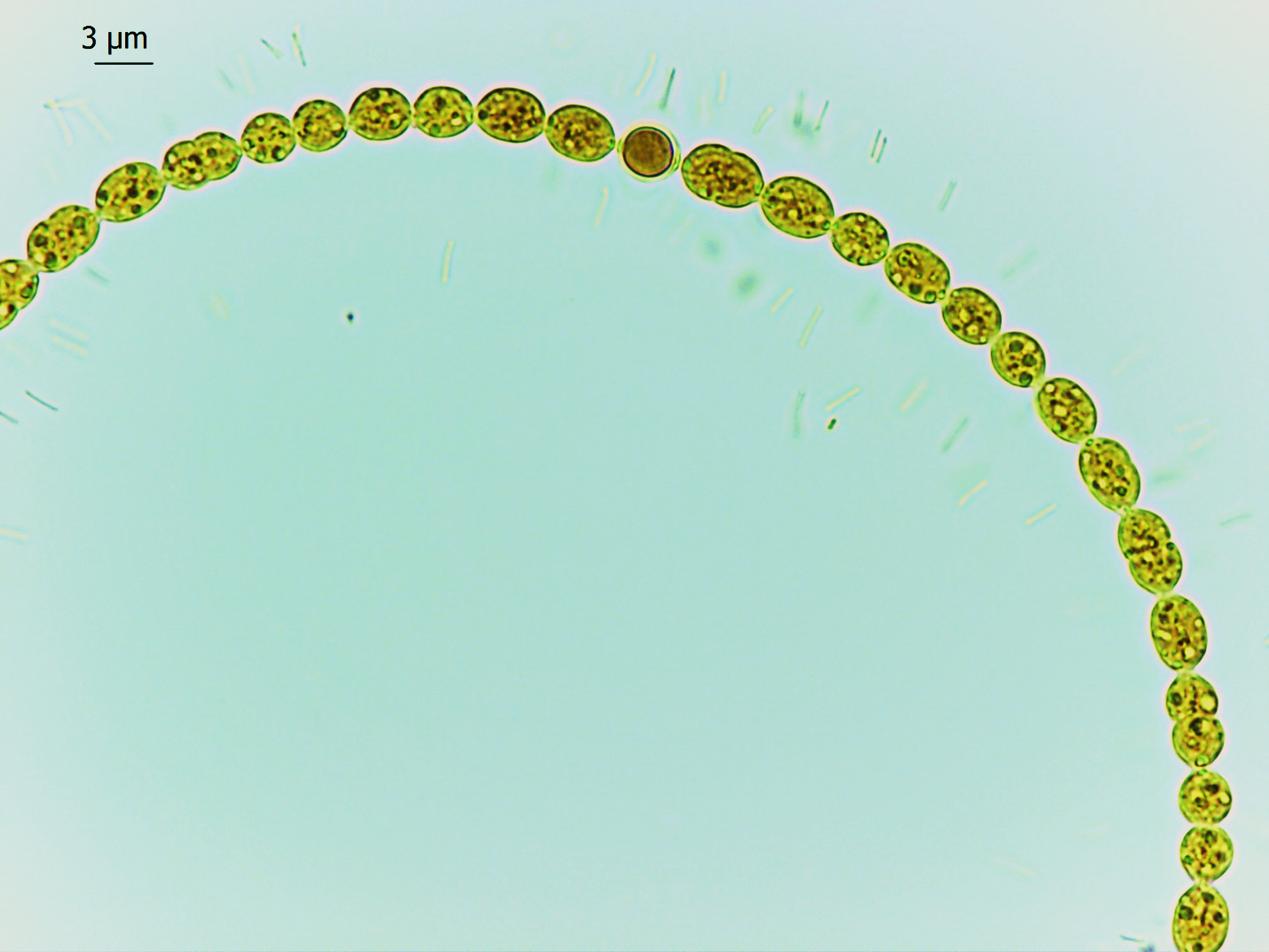
Anabaena sp.

Under nitrogen-limiting conditions, vegetative cells differentiate into heterocysts at semiregular intervals along the filaments. Heterocyst cells are terminally specialized for nitrogen fixation. The interior of these cells is micro-oxic as a result of increased respiration, inactivation of O_{2}-producing photosystem (PS) II, and formation of a thickened envelope outside of the cell wall. Nitrogenase, sequestered within these cells, transforms dinitrogen into ammonia at the expense of ATP and reductant—both generated by carbohydrate metabolism, a process supplemented, in the light, by the activity of PS I. Carbohydrate, probably in the form of glucose, is synthesized in vegetative cells and moves into heterocysts. In return, nitrogen fixed in heterocysts moves into the vegetative cells, at least in part in the form of amino acids.

The fern Azolla forms a symbiotic relationship with the cyanobacterium Anabaena azollae, which fixes atmospheric nitrogen, giving the plant access to this essential nutrient. This has led to the plant being dubbed a "super-plant", as it can readily colonise areas of freshwater, and grow at great speed - doubling its biomass in as little as 1.9 days. The typical limiting factor on its growth is phosphorus, abundance of which, due to chemical runoff, often leads to Azolla blooms. Unlike other known plants, the symbiotic microorganism is transferred directly from one generation to the next. This has made Anabaena azollae completely dependent on its host, as several of its genes are either lost or have been transferred to the nucleus in Azolla's cells.

== Primitive vision pigments studied in Anabaena ==
Anabaena is used as a model organism to study simple vision. The process in which light changes the shape of molecules in the retina, thereby driving the cellular reactions and signals that cause vision in vertebrates, is studied in Anabaena. Anabaena sensory rhodopsin, a specific light-sensitive membrane protein, is central to this research.

== DNA repair ==
Double strand breaks (DSBs) are a type of DNA damage that can be repaired by homologous recombination. This enzymatic repair process occurs in several enzymatic steps including an early step catalyzed by RecN protein. A study of the dynamics of RecN in DSB repair in Anabaena indicated differential regulation of DSB repair so that it is active in vegetative cells but absent in mature heterocysts that are terminal cells.
