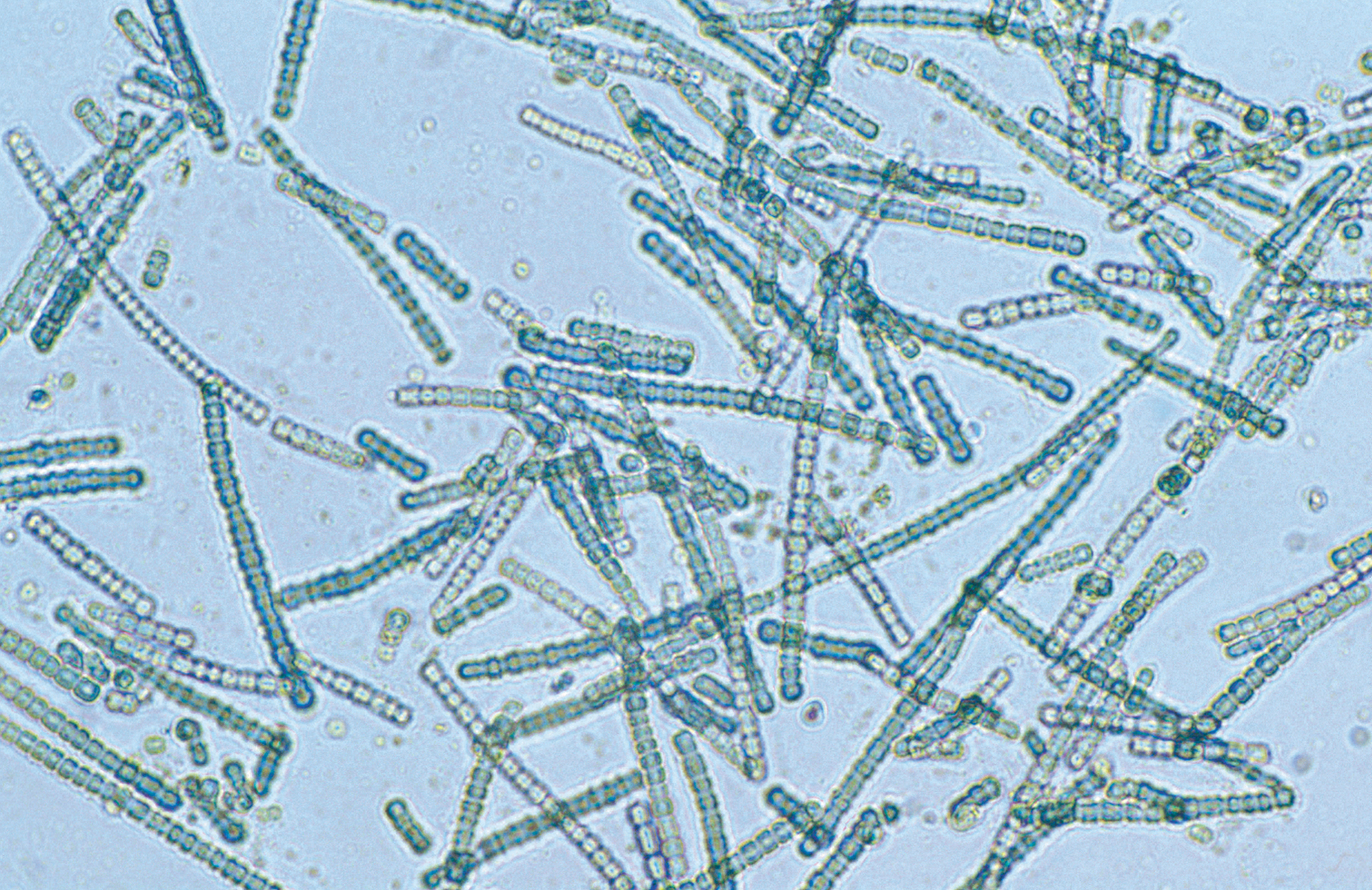
- Microscope image of Cylindrospermum, a filamentous genus of cyanobacteria

Scientific classification
- Domain: Bacteria
- Kingdom: Bacillati
- Phylum: Cyanobacteriota; Oren et al., 2022

Classes and genera
- Cyanophyceae; "Sericytochromatia"; Vampirovibrionophyceae; †Archaeosphaeroides; †Collenia; †Gunflintia; †Obruchevella; †Ozarkcollenia; †Rothpletzella

Synonyms (Note: See note on #Phylogeny.)
- List: Chloroxybacteria Margulis & Schwartz, 1982; "Cyanobacteria" Woese et al., 1985; "Cyanophycota" Parker, Schanen & Renner, 1969; "Cyanophyta" Steinecke, 1931; "Diploschizophyta" Dillon, 1963; "Endoschizophyta" Dillon, 1963; "Exoschizophyta" Dillon, 1963; Gonidiophyta Schaffner, 1909; "Phycobacteria" Cavalier-Smith, 1998; Phycochromaceae Rabenhorst, 1865; Prochlorobacteria Jeffrey, 1982; Prochlorophycota Shameel, 2008; Prochlorophyta Lewin, 1976; Chroococcophyceae Starmach, 1966; Chamaesiphonophyceae Starmach, 1966; Cyanobacteriia; Cyanophyceae Sachs, 1874; Cyanophyta Steinecke, 1931; Hormogoniophyceae Starmach, 1966; Myxophyceae Wallroth, 1833; Nostocophyceae Christensen, 1978; Pleurocapsophyceae Starmach, 1966; Prochlorophyceae Lewin, 1977; Scandophyceae Vologdin, 1962; Phycochromaceae Rabenhorst, 1865; Oxyphotobacteria Gibbons & Murray, 1978; Schizophyceae Cohn, 1879

= Cyanobacteria =

Cyanobacteria Temporal range: 2100–0 Ma (Possible Paleoarchean records)

Phylum of photosynthesising prokaryotes

Cyanobacteria (/saɪˌænoʊbækˈtɪəriə/ sy-AN-oh-bak-TEER-ee-ə) are a group of autotrophic gram-negative bacteria of the phylum Cyanobacteriota that can obtain biological energy via oxygenic photosynthesis. Cyanobacteria originated in a freshwater or terrestrial environment, and first appeared in the middle Archean eon. They are probably the most numerous taxon to have ever existed on Earth. The name "cyanobacteria" (from Ancient Greek κύανος (kúanos) 'blue') refers to their bluish green (cyan) color, which forms the basis of cyanobacteria's informal common name, blue-green algae. (Note: Some authors restrict the term algae to protists (eukaryotes), which does not extend to cyanobacteria, which are prokaryotes. However, the majority continue to refer to cyanobacteria as a type of algae.)

Cyanobacteria are the first organisms known to have produced oxygen. Their photopigments can absorb the red- and blue-spectrum frequencies of sunlight (thus reflecting a greenish color) to split water molecules into hydrogen ions and oxygen. The hydrogen ions are used to react with carbon dioxide to produce complex organic compounds such as carbohydrates (a process known as carbon fixation), and the oxygen is released as a byproduct. By continuously producing and releasing oxygen over billions of years, cyanobacteria are thought to have converted the early Earth's anoxic, weakly reducing prebiotic atmosphere, into an oxidizing one with free gaseous oxygen (which previously would have been immediately removed by various surface reductants), resulting in the Great Oxidation Event and the "rusting of the Earth" during the early Proterozoic, dramatically changing the composition of life forms on Earth. The subsequent adaptation of early single-celled organisms to survive in oxygenous environments likely led to endosymbiosis between anaerobes and aerobes, and hence the evolution of eukaryotes during the Paleoproterozoic.

Cyanobacteria use photosynthetic pigments such as various forms of chlorophyll, carotenoids and phycobilins to convert the photonic energy in sunlight to chemical energy. Unlike heterotrophic prokaryotes, cyanobacteria have internal membranes. These are flattened sacs called thylakoids where photosynthesis is performed. Photoautotrophic eukaryotes such as red algae, green algae and plants perform photosynthesis in chlorophyllic organelles that are thought to have their ancestry in cyanobacteria, acquired long ago via endosymbiosis. These endosymbiont cyanobacteria in eukaryotes then evolved and differentiated into specialized organelles such as chloroplasts, chromoplasts, etioplasts, and leucoplasts, collectively known as plastids.

The cyanobacteria Synechocystis and Cyanothece are important model organisms with potential applications in biotechnology for bioethanol production, food colorings, as a source of human and animal food, dietary supplements and raw materials. Cyanobacteria produce a range of toxins known as cyanotoxins that can cause harmful health effects in humans and animals. Sericytochromatia, the proposed name of the paraphyletic and most basal group, is the ancestor of both the non-photosynthetic group Melainabacteria and the photosynthetic cyanobacteria, also called Oxyphotobacteria.

== Overview ==
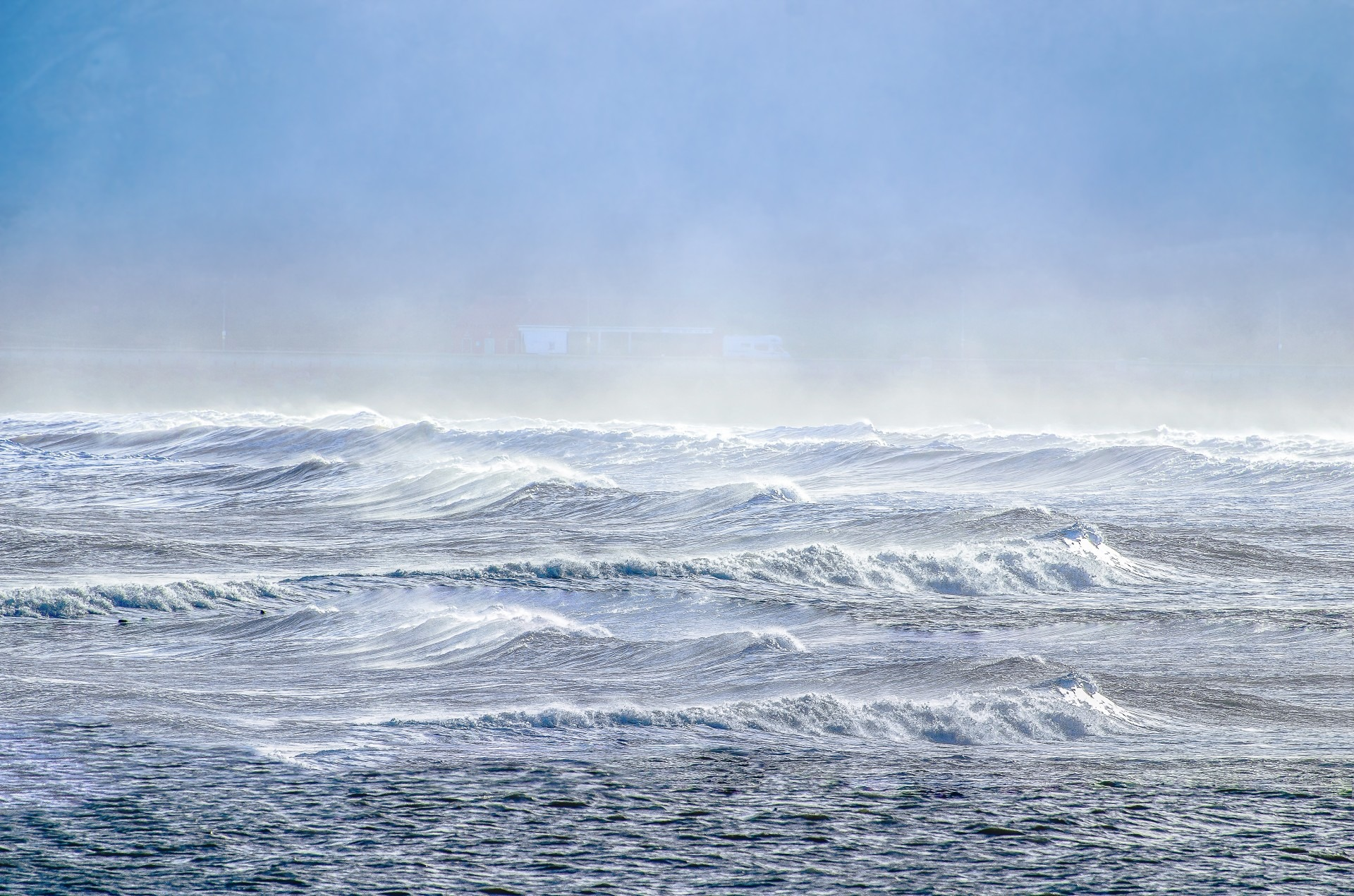
Cyanobacteria are found almost everywhere. Sea spray containing marine microorganisms, including cyanobacteria, can be swept high into the atmosphere where they become aeroplankton, and can travel the globe before falling back to earth.

Cyanobacteria are a large and diverse phylum of photosynthetic prokaryotes. They are defined by their unique combination of pigments and their ability to perform oxygenic photosynthesis. They often live in colonial aggregates that can take on a multitude of forms. Of particular interest are the filamentous species, which often dominate the upper layers of microbial mats found in extreme environments such as hot springs, hypersaline water, deserts and the polar regions, but are also widely distributed in more mundane environments as well. They are evolutionarily optimized for environmental conditions of low oxygen. Some species are nitrogen-fixing and live in a wide variety of moist soils and water, either freely or in a symbiotic relationship with plants or lichen-forming fungi (as in the lichen genus Peltigera).

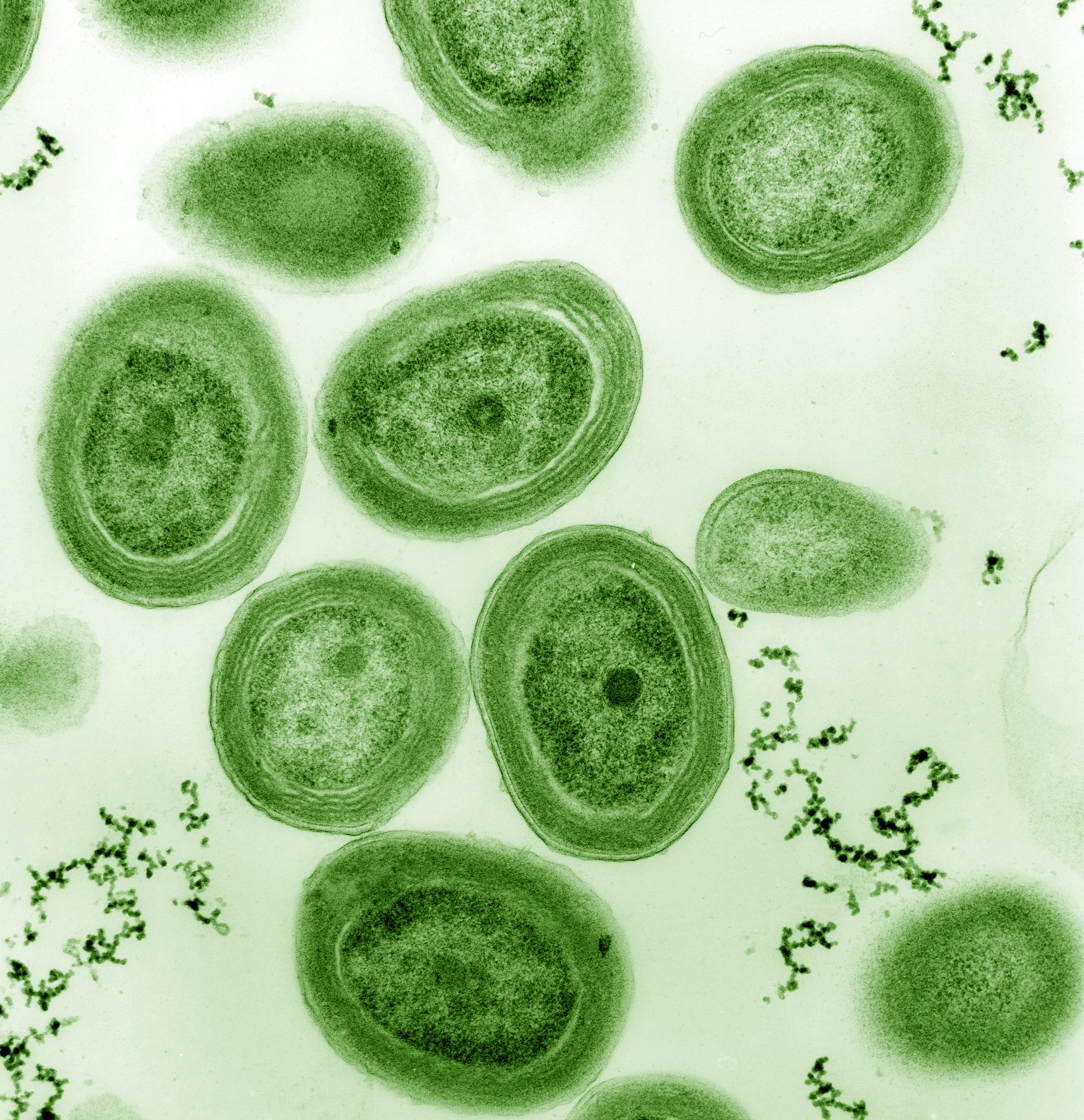
Prochlorococcus, an influential marine cyanobacterium which produces much of the world's oxygen

Cyanobacteria are globally widespread photosynthetic prokaryotes and are major contributors to global biogeochemical cycles. They are the only oxygenic photosynthetic prokaryotes, and prosper in diverse and extreme habitats. They are among the oldest organisms on Earth with fossil records dating back at least 2.1 billion years. Since then, cyanobacteria have been essential players in the Earth's ecosystems. Planktonic cyanobacteria are a fundamental component of marine food webs and are major contributors to global carbon and nitrogen fluxes. Some cyanobacteria form harmful algal blooms causing the disruption of aquatic ecosystems and intoxication of wildlife and humans by the production of powerful toxins (cyanotoxins) such as microcystins, saxitoxin, and cylindrospermopsin. Nowadays, cyanobacterial blooms caused by agricultural and industrial pollution pose a serious threat to aquatic environments and public health, and are increasing in frequency and magnitude globally.

Cyanobacteria are ubiquitous in marine environments and play important roles as primary producers. They are part of the marine phytoplankton, which currently contributes almost half of the Earth's total primary production. About 25% of the global marine primary production is contributed by cyanobacteria.

Within the cyanobacteria, only a few lineages colonized the open ocean: Crocosphaera and relatives, cyanobacterium UCYN-A, Trichodesmium, as well as Prochlorococcus and Synechococcus. From these lineages, nitrogen-fixing cyanobacteria are particularly important because they exert a control on primary productivity and the export of organic carbon to the deep ocean, by converting nitrogen gas into ammonium, which is later used to make amino acids and proteins. Marine picocyanobacteria (Prochlorococcus and Synechococcus) numerically dominate most phytoplankton assemblages in modern oceans, contributing importantly to primary productivity. While some planktonic cyanobacteria are unicellular and free living cells (e.g., Crocosphaera, Prochlorococcus, Synechococcus); others have established symbiotic relationships with haptophyte algae, such as coccolithophores. Amongst the filamentous forms, Trichodesmium are free-living and form aggregates. However, filamentous heterocyst-forming cyanobacteria (e.g., Richelia, Calothrix) are found in association with diatoms such as Hemiaulus, Rhizosolenia and Chaetoceros.

Marine cyanobacteria include the smallest known photosynthetic organisms. The smallest of all, Prochlorococcus, is just 0.5 to 0.8 micrometres across. In terms of numbers of individuals, Prochlorococcus is possibly the most plentiful genus on Earth: a single millilitre of surface seawater can contain 100,000 cells of this genus or more. Worldwide there are estimated to be several octillion (10^{27}, a billion billion billion) individuals. Prochlorococcus is ubiquitous between latitudes 40°N and 40°S, and dominates in the oligotrophic (nutrient-poor) regions of the oceans. The bacterium accounts for about 20% of the oxygen in the Earth's atmosphere.

== Morphology ==
Diversity in cyanobacteria morphology

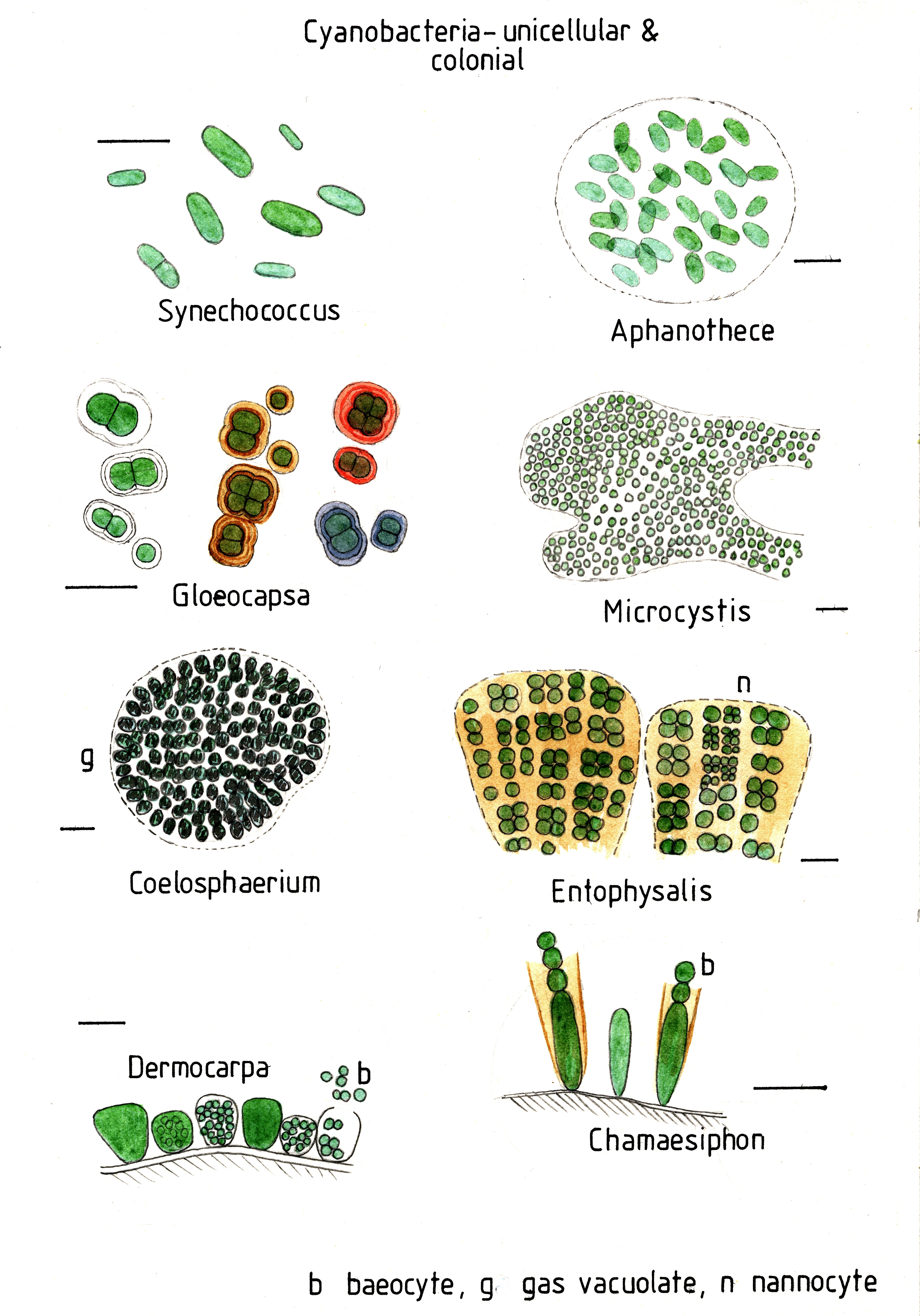
Unicellular and colonial cyanobacteria.
(scale bars about 10 μm)

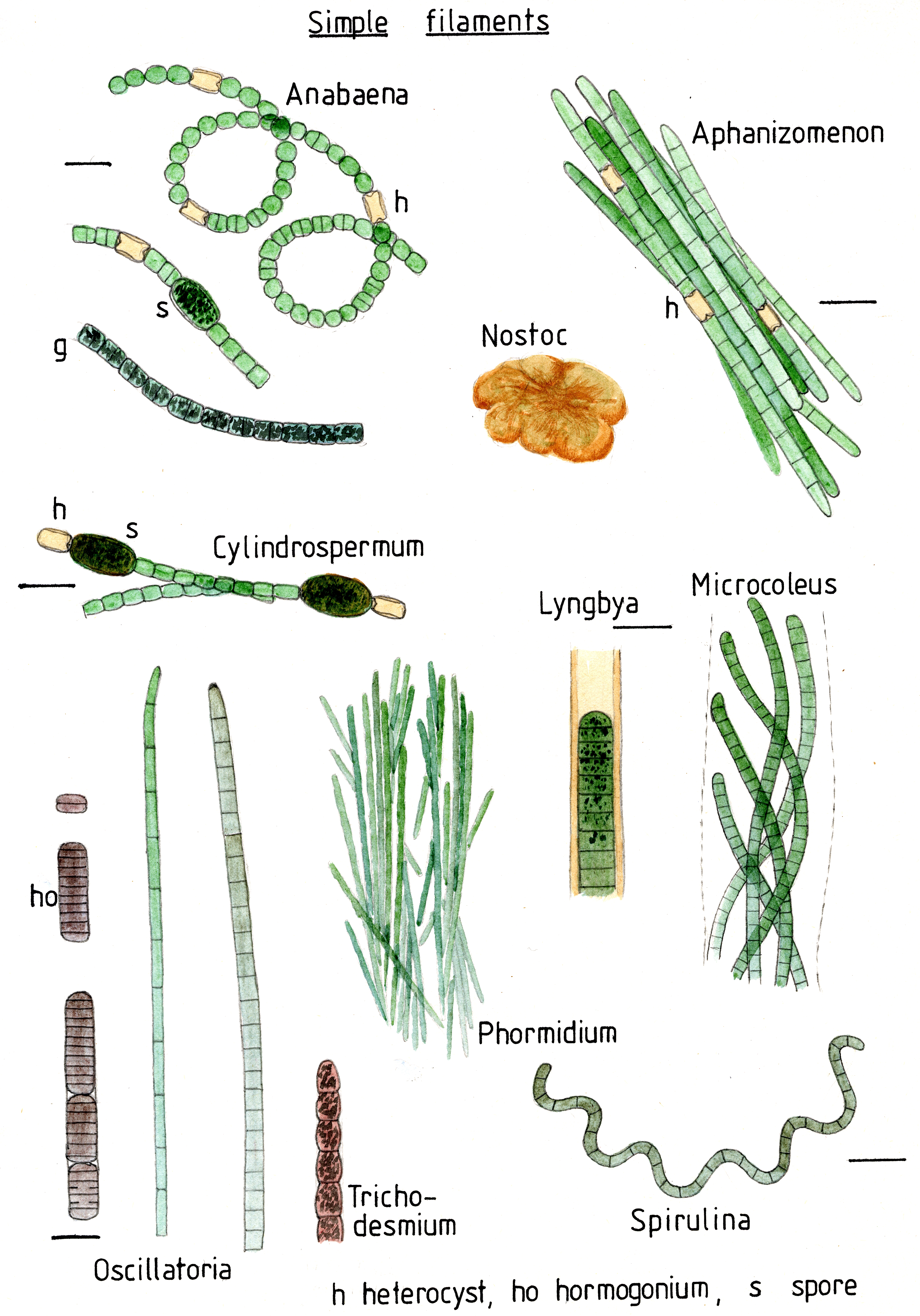
Simple cyanobacterial filaments Nostocales, Oscillatoriales and Spirulinales

Cyanobacteria are variable in morphology, ranging from unicellular and filamentous to colonial forms. Filamentous forms exhibit functional cell differentiation such as heterocysts (for nitrogen fixation), akinetes (resting stage cells), and hormogonia (reproductive, motile filaments). These, together with the intercellular connections they possess, are considered the first signs of multicellularity.

Many cyanobacteria form motile filaments of cells, called hormogonia, that travel away from the main biomass to bud and form new colonies elsewhere. The cells in a hormogonium are often thinner than in the vegetative state, and the cells on either end of the motile chain may be tapered. To break away from the parent colony, a hormogonium often must tear apart a weaker cell in a filament, called a necridium.

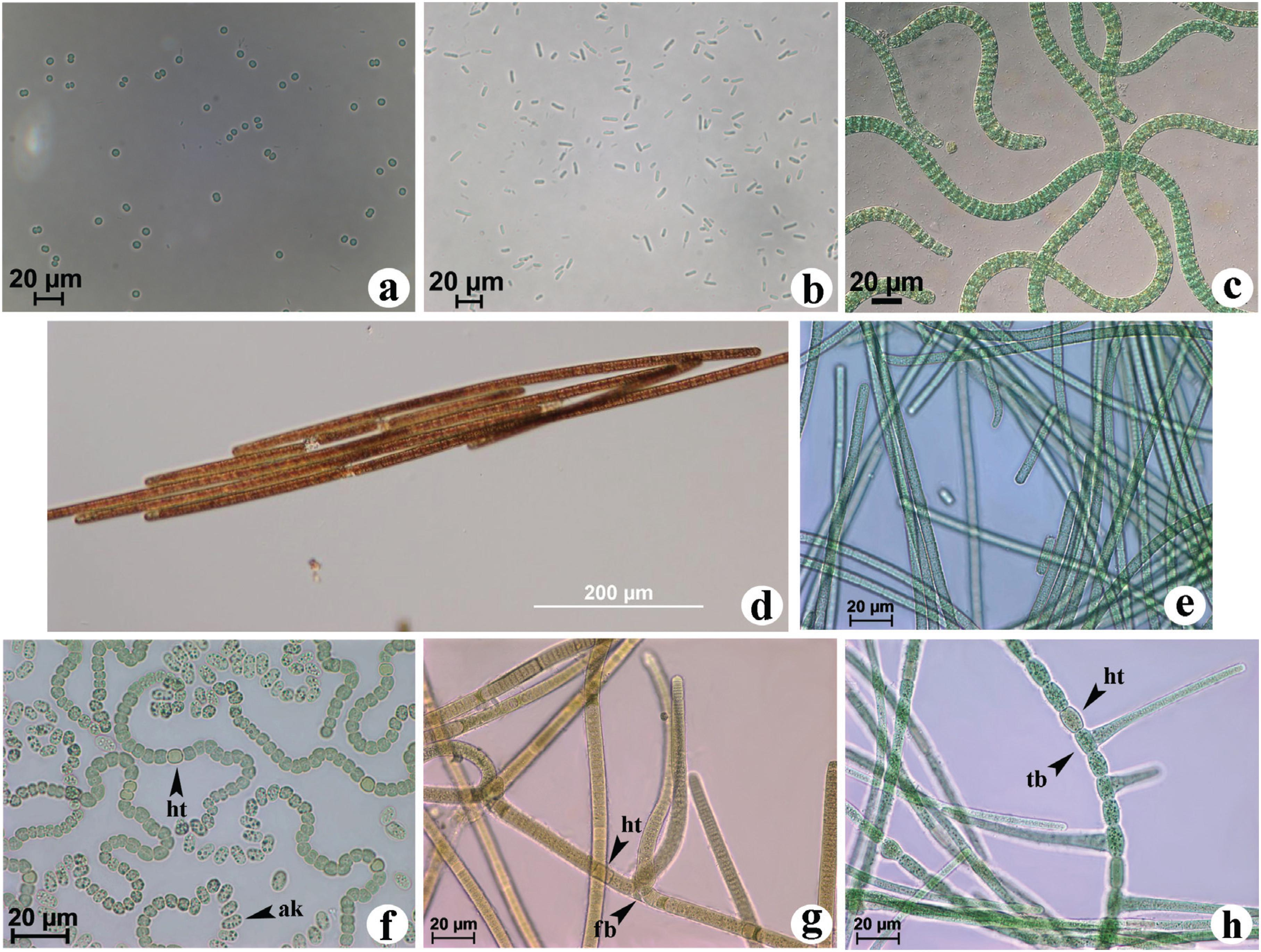
Morphological variations: Unicellular: (a) Synechocystis and (b) Synechococcus elongatus; Non-heterocytous: (c) Arthrospira maxima,(d) Trichodesmium and (e) Phormidium; False- or non-branching heterocytous: (f) Nostoc and (g) Brasilonema octagenarum; True-branching heterocytous: (h) Stigonema (ak) akinetes (fb) false branching (tb) true branching

Some filamentous species can differentiate into several different cell types:

- Vegetative cells – the normal, photosynthetic cells that are formed under favorable growing conditions
- Akinetes – climate-resistant spores that may form when environmental conditions become harsh
- Thick-walled heterocysts – which contain the enzyme nitrogenase vital for nitrogen fixation in an anaerobic environment due to its sensitivity to oxygen.

Each individual cell (each single cyanobacterium) typically has a thick, gelatinous cell wall. They lack flagella, but hormogonia of some species can move about by gliding along surfaces. Many of the multicellular filamentous forms of Oscillatoria are capable of a waving motion; the filament oscillates back and forth. In water columns, some cyanobacteria float by forming gas vesicles, as in archaea. These vesicles are not organelles as such. They are not bounded by lipid membranes, but by a protein sheath.

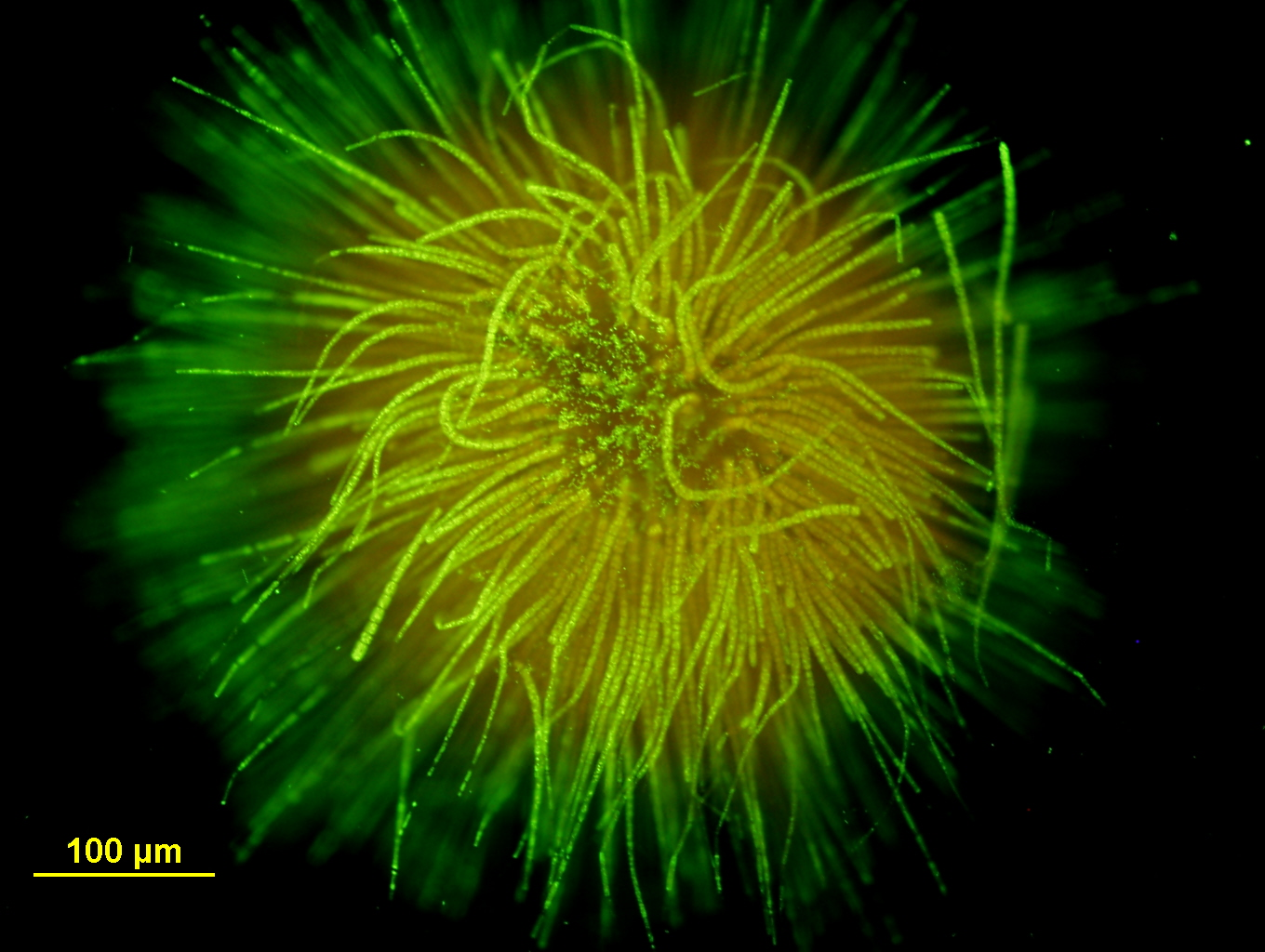
Ball-shaped colony of Gloeotrichia echinulata stained with SYTOX

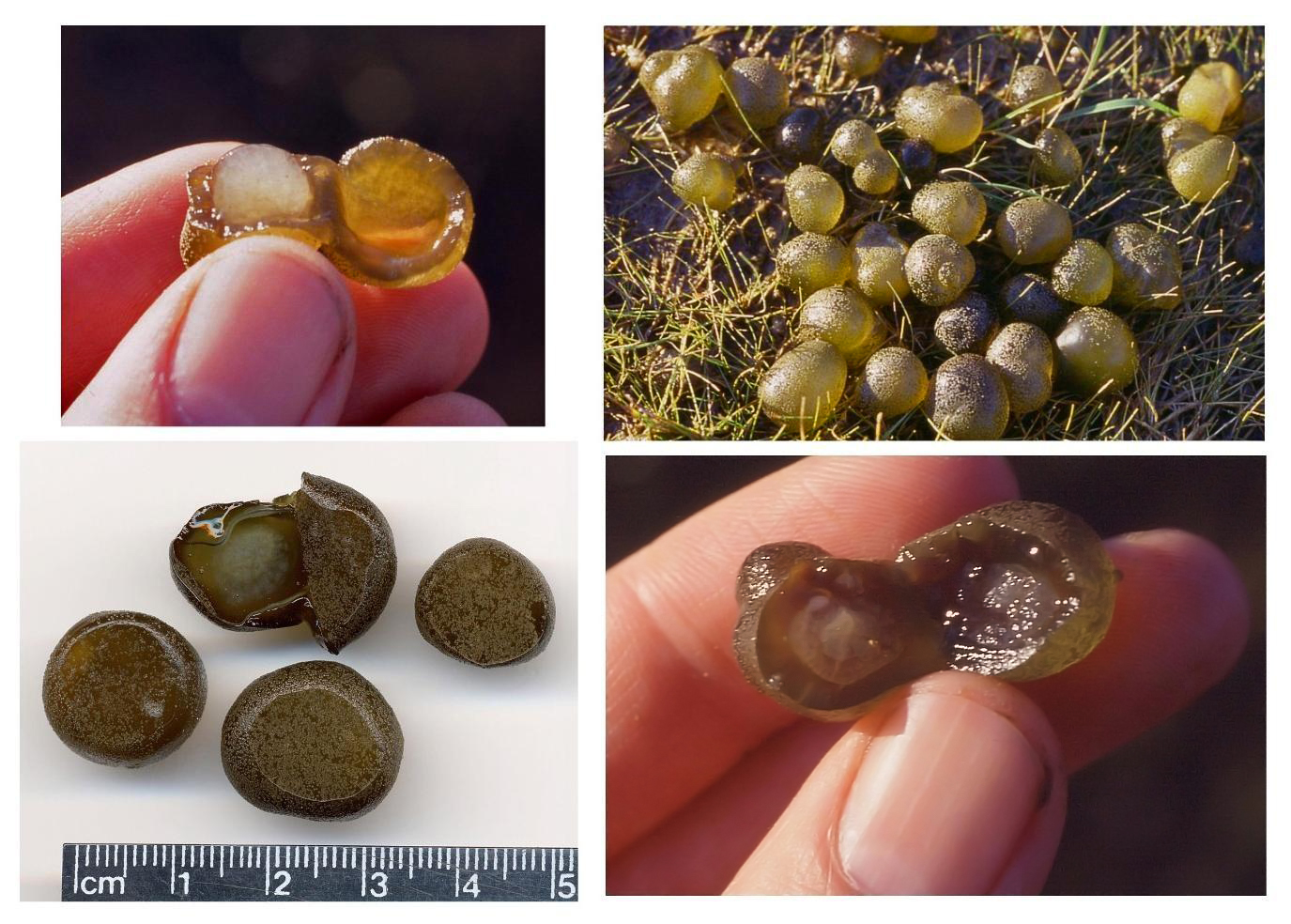
Colonies of Nostoc pruniforme

== Nitrogen fixation ==
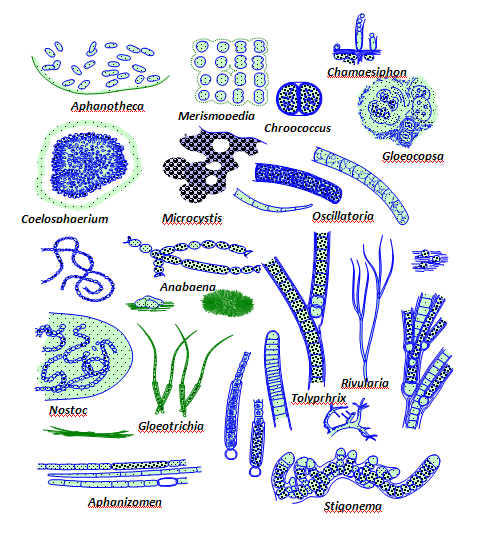
Nitrogen-fixing cyanobacteria

Some cyanobacteria can fix atmospheric nitrogen in anaerobic conditions by means of specialized cells called heterocysts. Heterocysts may also form under the appropriate environmental conditions (anoxic) when fixed nitrogen is scarce. Heterocyst-forming species are specialized for nitrogen fixation and are able to fix nitrogen gas into ammonia (NH_{3}), nitrites (NO^{−}_{2}) or nitrates (NO^{−}_{3}), which can be absorbed by plants and converted to protein and nucleic acids (atmospheric nitrogen is not bioavailable to plants, except for those having endosymbiotic nitrogen-fixing bacteria, especially the family Fabaceae, among others). Nitrogen fixation commonly occurs on a cycle of nitrogen fixation during the night because photosynthesis can inhibit nitrogen fixation.

Free-living cyanobacteria are present in the water of rice paddies, and cyanobacteria can be found growing as epiphytes on the surfaces of the green alga, Chara, where they may fix nitrogen. Cyanobacteria such as Anabaena (a symbiont of the aquatic fern Azolla) can provide rice plantations with biofertilizer.

== Photosynthesis ==
Diagram of a typical cyanobacterial cell

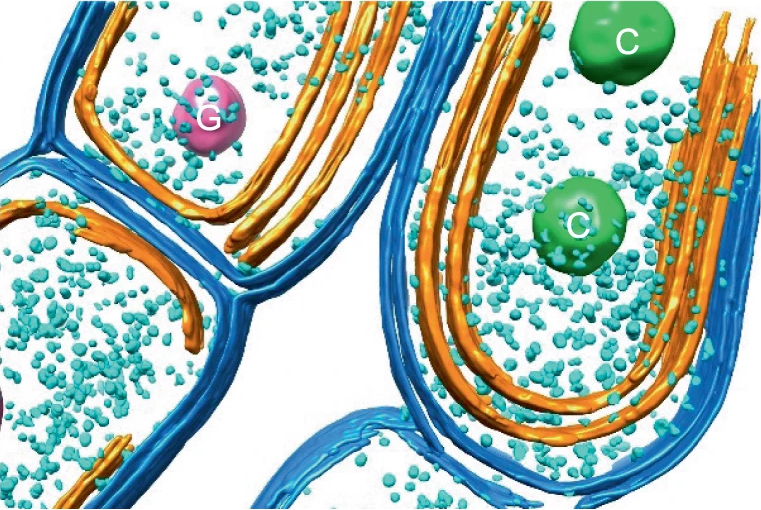
Cyanobacterial thylakoid membrane Outer and plasma membranes are in blue, thylakoid membranes in gold, glycogen granules in cyan, carboxysomes (C) in green, and a large dense polyphosphate granule (G) in pink

=== Carbon fixation ===
The thylakoids of cyanobacteria use the energy of sunlight to drive photosynthesis, a process where the energy of light is used to synthesize organic compounds from carbon dioxide. Because they are aquatic organisms, they typically employ several strategies which are collectively known as a "CO_{2} concentrating mechanism" to aid in the acquisition of inorganic carbon (CO_{2} or bicarbonate). Among the more specific strategies is the widespread prevalence of the bacterial microcompartments known as carboxysomes, which co-operate with active transporters of CO_{2} and bicarbonate, in order to accumulate bicarbonate into the cytoplasm of the cell. Carboxysomes are icosahedral structures composed of hexameric shell proteins that assemble into cage-like structures that can be several hundreds of nanometres in diameter. It is believed that these structures tether the CO_{2}-fixing enzyme, RuBisCO, to the interior of the shell, as well as the enzyme carbonic anhydrase, using metabolic channeling to enhance the local CO_{2} concentrations and thus increase the efficiency of the RuBisCO enzyme.

=== Electron transport ===
In contrast to purple bacteria and other bacteria performing anoxygenic photosynthesis, thylakoid membranes of cyanobacteria are not continuous with the plasma membrane but are separate compartments. The photosynthetic machinery is embedded in the thylakoid membranes, with phycobilisomes acting as light-harvesting antennae attached to the membrane, giving the green pigmentation observed (with wavelengths from 450 nm to 660 nm) in most cyanobacteria.

While most of the high-energy electrons derived from water are used by the cyanobacterial cells for their own needs, a fraction of these electrons may be donated to the external environment via electrogenic activity.

==== Respiration ====
Respiration in cyanobacteria can occur in the thylakoid membrane alongside photosynthesis, with their photosynthetic electron transport sharing the same compartment as the components of respiratory electron transport. While the goal of photosynthesis is to store energy by building carbohydrates from CO_{2}, respiration is the reverse of this, with carbohydrates turned back into CO_{2} accompanying energy release.

Cyanobacteria appear to separate these two processes with their plasma membrane containing only components of the respiratory chain, while the thylakoid membrane hosts an interlinked respiratory and photosynthetic electron transport chain. Cyanobacteria use electrons from succinate dehydrogenase rather than from NADPH for respiration.

Cyanobacteria only respire during the night (or in the dark) because the facilities used for electron transport are used in reverse for photosynthesis while in the light.

==== Electron transport chain ====
Many cyanobacteria are able to reduce nitrogen and carbon dioxide under aerobic conditions (using different methods to circumvent the deleterious effect of dioxygen on nitrogenases), a fact that may be responsible for their evolutionary and ecological success. The water-oxidizing photosynthesis is accomplished by coupling the activity of photosystem (PS) II and I (Z-scheme). In contrast to green sulfur bacteria which only use one photosystem, the use of water as an electron donor is energetically demanding, requiring two photosystems.

Attached to the thylakoid membrane, phycobilisomes act as light-harvesting antennae for the photosystems. The phycobilisome components (phycobiliproteins) are responsible for the blue-green pigmentation of most cyanobacteria. The variations on this theme are due mainly to carotenoids and phycoerythrins that give the cells their red-brownish coloration. In some cyanobacteria, the color of light influences the composition of the phycobilisomes. In green light, the cells accumulate more phycoerythrin, which absorbs green light, whereas in red light they produce more phycocyanin which absorbs red. Thus, these bacteria can change from brick-red to bright blue-green depending on whether they are exposed to green light or to red light. This process of "complementary chromatic adaptation" is a way for the cells to maximize the use of available light for photosynthesis.

A few genera lack phycobilisomes and have chlorophyll b instead (Prochloron, Prochlorococcus, Prochlorothrix). These were originally grouped together as the prochlorophytes or chloroxybacteria, but appear to have developed in several different lines of cyanobacteria. For this reason, they are now considered as part of the cyanobacterial group.

==== Metabolism ====
In general, photosynthesis in cyanobacteria uses water as an electron donor and produces oxygen as a byproduct, though some may also use hydrogen sulfide a process which occurs among other photosynthetic bacteria such as the purple sulfur bacteria.

Carbon dioxide is reduced to form carbohydrates via the Calvin cycle. The large amounts of oxygen in the atmosphere are considered to have been first created by the activities of ancient cyanobacteria. They are often found as symbionts with a number of other groups of organisms such as fungi (lichens), corals, pteridophytes (Azolla), angiosperms (Gunnera), etc. The carbon metabolism of cyanobacteria include the incomplete Krebs cycle, the pentose phosphate pathway, and glycolysis.

Many cyanobacteria are mixotrophic, capable of growth on organic carbon as well as photosynthesis. In addition, some cyanobacteria are capable of fermentation under anoxic conditions. Others are parasitic, causing diseases in invertebrates or algae (e.g., the black band disease).

== Ecology ==
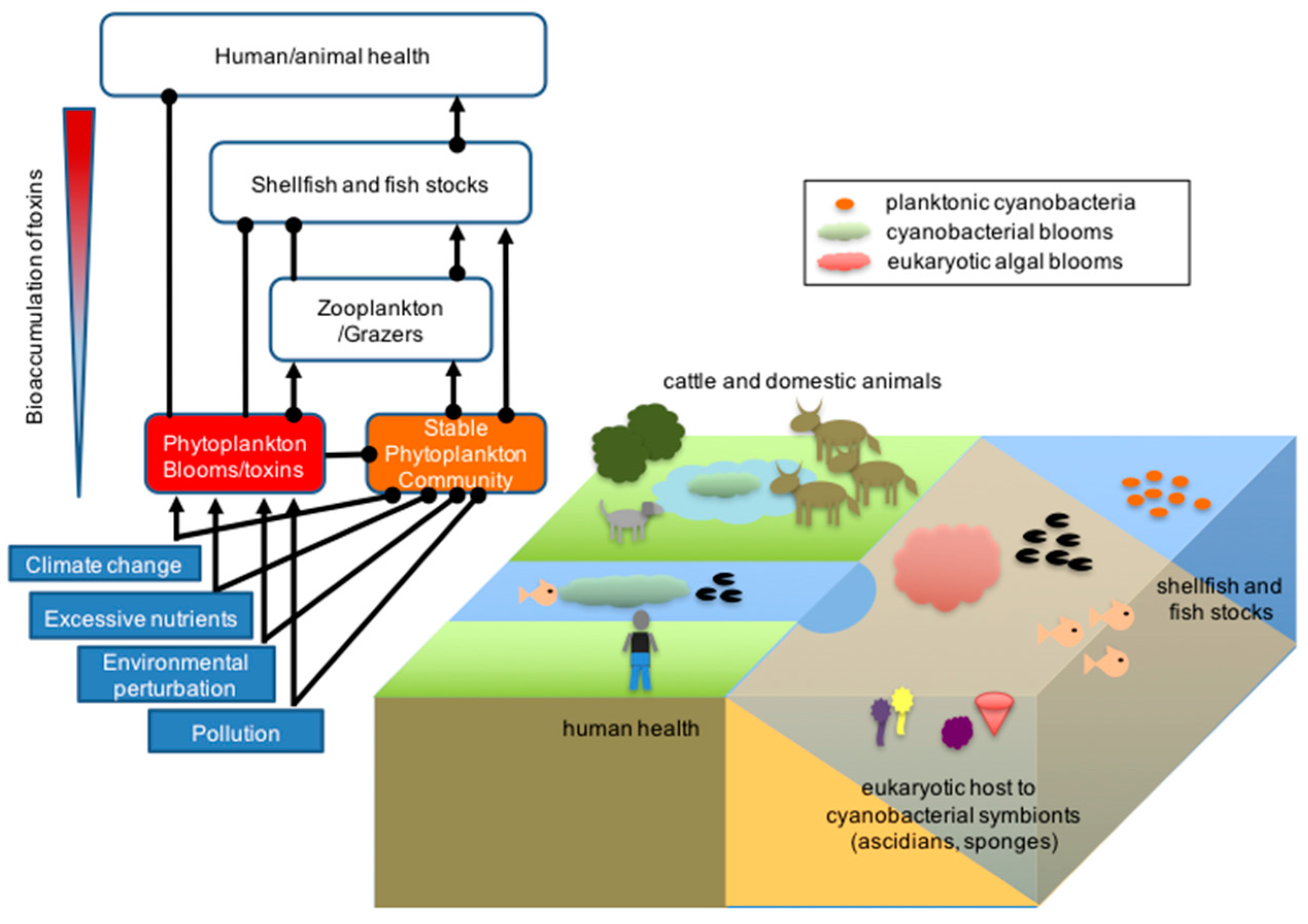
Environmental impact of cyanobacteria and other photosynthetic microorganisms in aquatic systems. Different classes of photosynthetic microorganisms are found in aquatic and marine environments where they form the base of healthy food webs and participate in symbioses with other organisms. However, shifting environmental conditions can result in community dysbiosis, where the growth of opportunistic species can lead to harmful blooms and toxin production with negative consequences to human health, livestock and fish stocks. Positive interactions are indicated by arrows; negative interactions are indicated by closed circles on the ecological model.

Cyanobacteria can be found in almost every terrestrial and aquatic habitat – oceans, fresh water, damp soil, temporarily moistened rocks in deserts, bare rock and soil, and even Antarctic rocks. They can occur as planktonic cells or form phototrophic biofilms. They are found inside stones and shells (in endolithic ecosystems). A few are endosymbionts in lichens, plants, various protists, or sponges and provide energy for the host. Some live in the fur of sloths, providing a form of camouflage.

Aquatic cyanobacteria are known for their extensive and highly visible blooms that can form in both freshwater and marine environments. The blooms can have the appearance of blue-green paint or scum. These blooms can be toxic, and frequently lead to the closure of recreational waters when spotted. Marine bacteriophages are significant parasites of unicellular marine cyanobacteria.

Cyanobacterial growth is favoured in ponds and lakes where waters are calm and have little turbulent mixing. Their lifecycles are disrupted when the water naturally or artificially mixes from churning currents caused by the flowing water of streams or the churning water of fountains. For this reason blooms of cyanobacteria seldom occur in rivers unless the water is flowing slowly. Growth is also favoured at higher temperatures which enable Microcystis species to outcompete diatoms and green algae, and potentially allow development of toxins.

Based on environmental trends, models and observations suggest cyanobacteria will likely increase their dominance in aquatic environments. This can lead to serious consequences, particularly the contamination of sources of drinking water. Researchers including Linda Lawton at Robert Gordon University, have developed techniques to study these. Cyanobacteria can interfere with water treatment in various ways, primarily by plugging filters (often large beds of sand and similar media) and by producing cyanotoxins, which have the potential to cause serious illness if consumed. Consequences may also lie within fisheries and waste management practices. Anthropogenic eutrophication, rising temperatures, vertical stratification and increased atmospheric carbon dioxide are contributors to cyanobacteria increasing dominance of aquatic ecosystems.

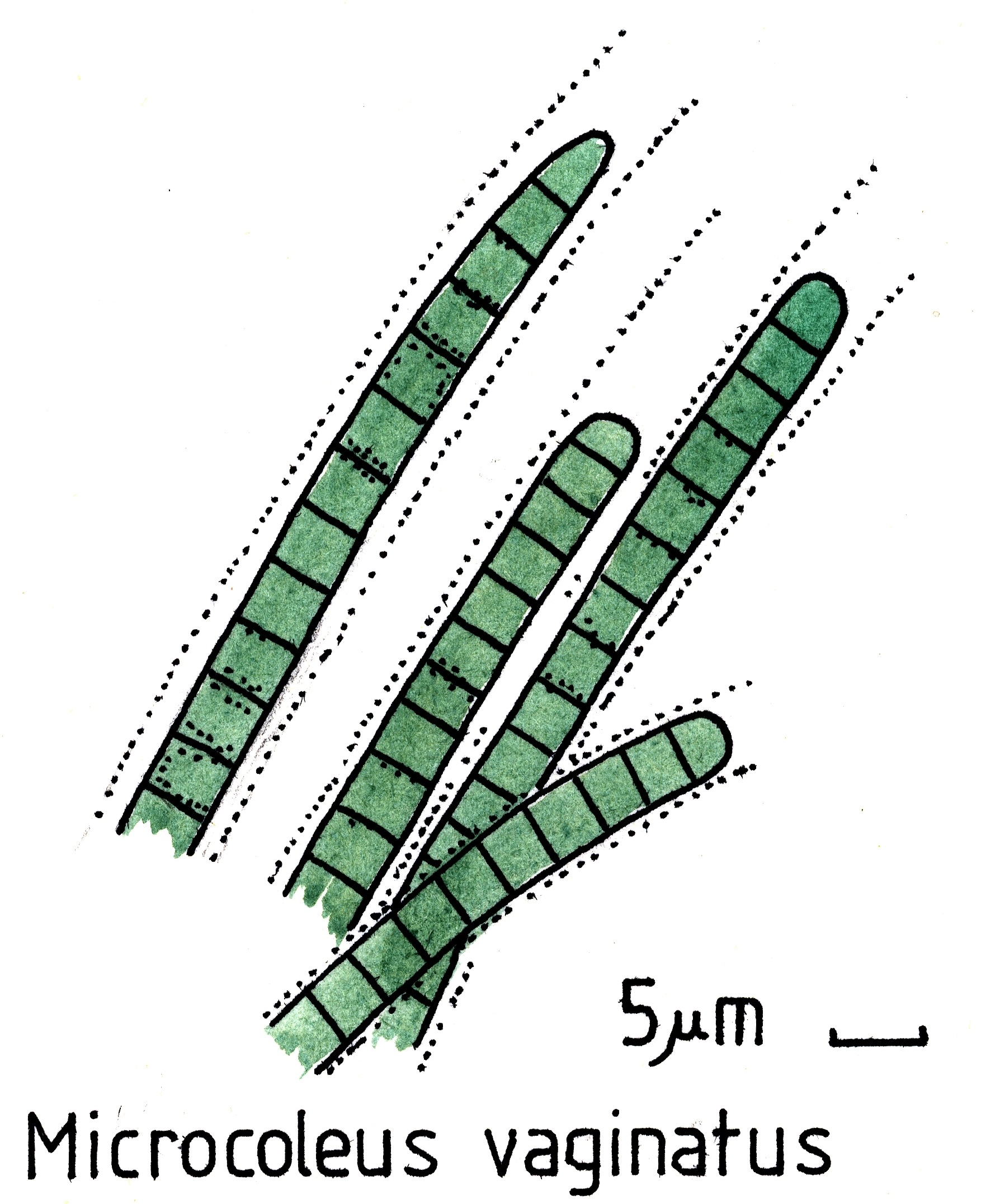
Diagnostic Drawing: Cyanobacteria associated with tufa: Microcoleus vaginatus

Cyanobacteria have been found to play an important role in terrestrial habitats and organism communities. It has been widely reported that cyanobacteria soil crusts help to stabilize soil to prevent erosion and retain water. An example of a cyanobacterial species that does so is Microcoleus vaginatus. M. vaginatus stabilizes soil using a polysaccharide sheath that binds to sand particles and absorbs water. M. vaginatus also makes a significant contribution to the cohesion of biological soil crust.

Some of these organisms contribute significantly to global ecology and the oxygen cycle. The tiny marine cyanobacterium Prochlorococcus was discovered in 1986 and accounts for more than half of the photosynthesis of the open ocean. Circadian rhythms were once thought to only exist in eukaryotic cells but many cyanobacteria display a bacterial circadian rhythm.

"Cyanobacteria are arguably the most successful group of microorganisms on earth. They are the most genetically diverse; they occupy a broad range of habitats across all latitudes, widespread in freshwater, marine, and terrestrial ecosystems, and they are found in the most extreme niches such as hot springs, salt works, and hypersaline bays. Photoautotrophic, oxygen-producing cyanobacteria created the conditions in the planet's early atmosphere that directed the evolution of aerobic metabolism and eukaryotic photosynthesis. Cyanobacteria fulfill vital ecological functions in the world's oceans, being important contributors to global carbon and nitrogen budgets." – Stewart and Falconer

=== Cyanobionts ===
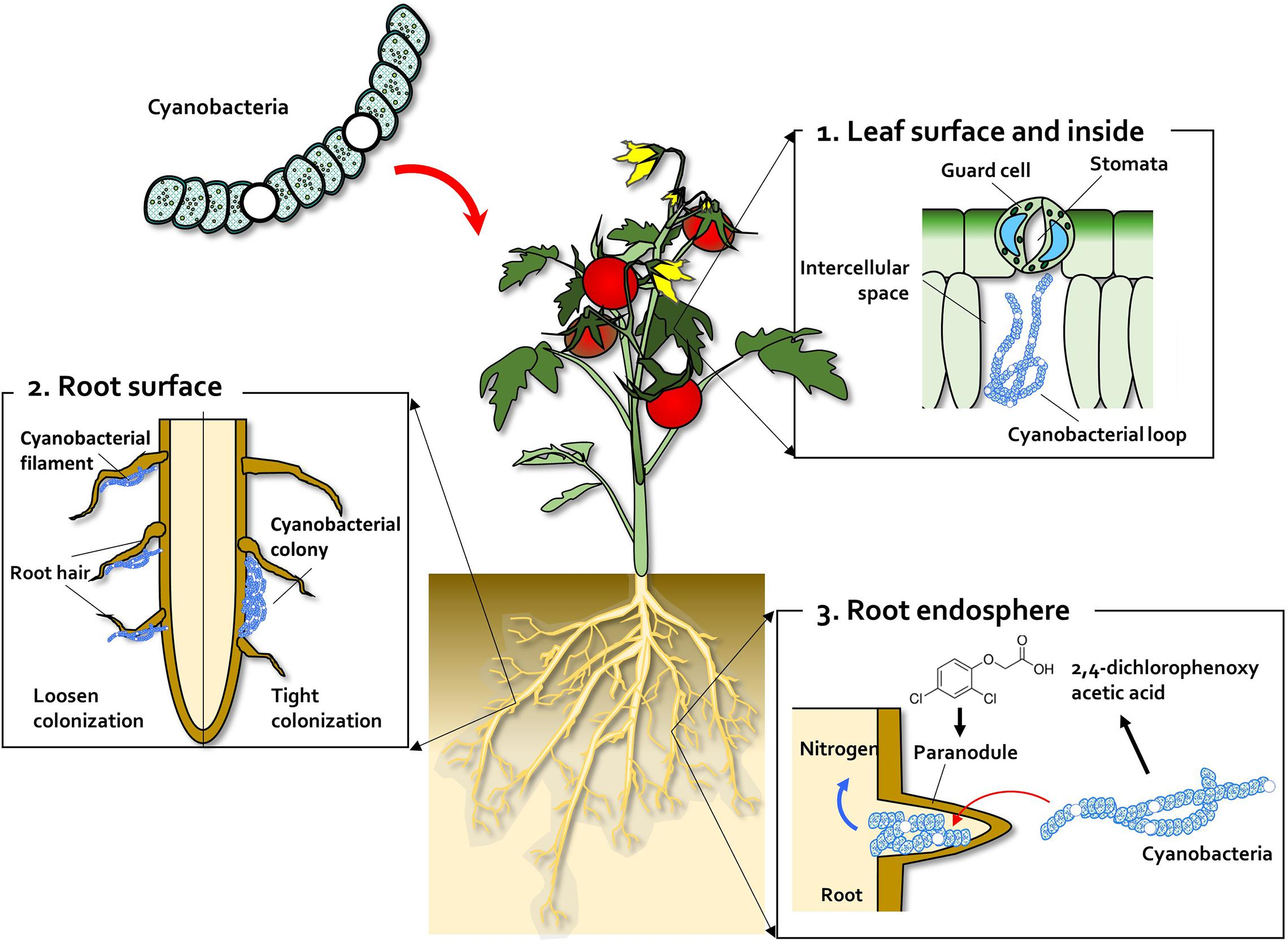
Symbiosis with land plants Leaf and root colonization by cyanobacteria (1) Cyanobacteria enter the leaf tissue through the stomata and colonize the intercellular space, forming a cyanobacterial loop. (2) On the root surface, cyanobacteria exhibit two types of colonization pattern; in the root hair, filaments of Anabaena and Nostoc species form loose colonies, and in the restricted zone on the root surface, specific Nostoc species form cyanobacterial colonies. (3) Co-inoculation with 2,4-D and Nostoc spp. increases para-nodule formation and nitrogen fixation. A large number of Nostoc spp. isolates colonize the root endosphere and form para-nodules.

Some cyanobacteria, the so-called cyanobionts (cyanobacterial symbionts), have a symbiotic relationship with other organisms, both unicellular and multicellular. As illustrated on the right, there are many examples of cyanobacteria interacting symbiotically with land plants. Cyanobacteria can enter the plant through the stomata and colonize the intercellular space, forming loops and intracellular coils. Anabaena spp. colonize the roots of wheat and cotton plants. Calothrix sp. has also been found on the root system of wheat. Monocots, such as wheat and rice, have been colonised by Nostoc spp., In 1991, Ganther and others isolated diverse heterocystous nitrogen-fixing cyanobacteria, including Nostoc, Anabaena and Cylindrospermum, from plant root and soil. Assessment of wheat seedling roots revealed two types of association patterns: loose colonization of root hair by Anabaena and tight colonization of the root surface within a restricted zone by Nostoc.

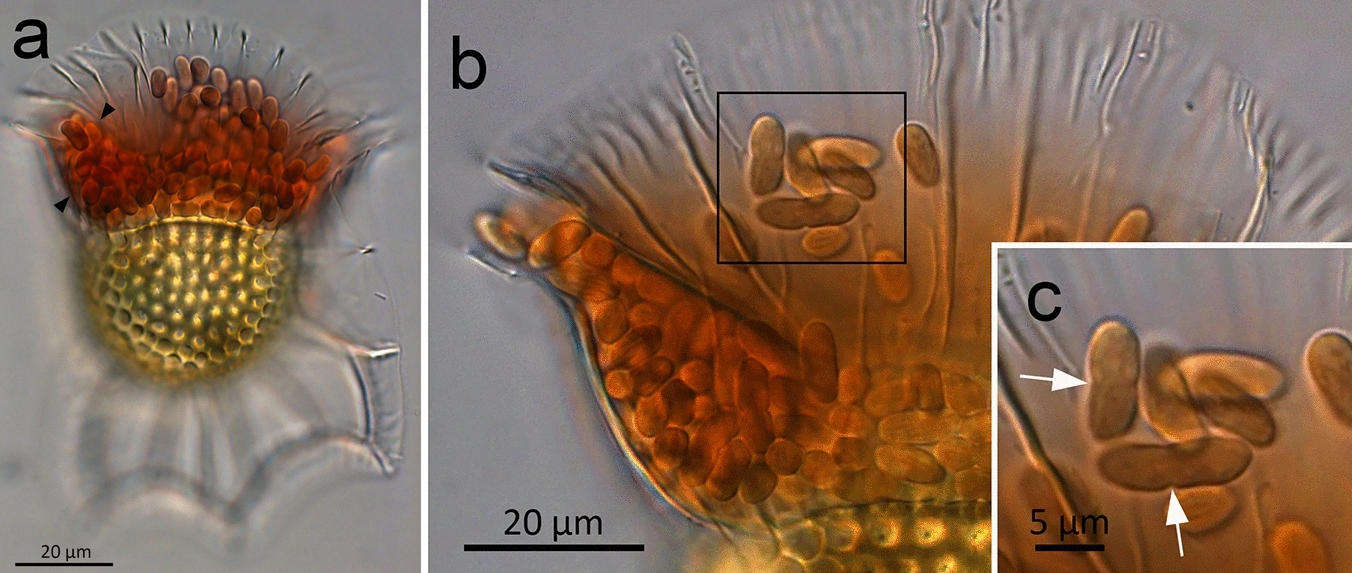
Cyanobionts of Ornithocercus dinoflagellates Live cyanobionts (cyanobacterial symbionts) belonging to Ornithocercus dinoflagellate host consortium (a) O. magnificus with numerous cyanobionts present in the upper and lower girdle lists (black arrowheads) of the cingulum termed the symbiotic chamber. (b) O. steinii with numerous cyanobionts inhabiting the symbiotic chamber. (c) Enlargement of the area in (b) showing two cyanobionts that are being divided by binary transverse fission (white arrows).

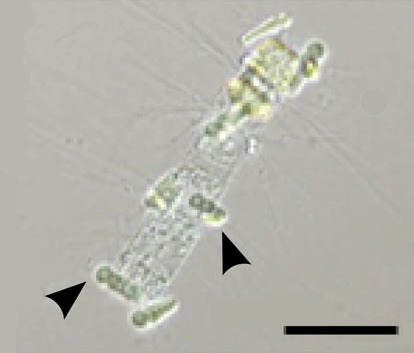
Epiphytic Calothrix cyanobacteria (arrows) in symbiosis with a Chaetoceros diatom. Scale bar 50 μm.

The relationships between cyanobionts (cyanobacterial symbionts) and protistan hosts are particularly noteworthy, as some nitrogen-fixing cyanobacteria (diazotrophs) play an important role in primary production, especially in nitrogen-limited oligotrophic oceans. Cyanobacteria, mostly pico-sized Synechococcus and Prochlorococcus, are ubiquitously distributed and are the most abundant photosynthetic organisms on Earth, accounting for a quarter of all carbon fixed in marine ecosystems. In contrast to free-living marine cyanobacteria, some cyanobionts are known to be responsible for nitrogen fixation rather than carbon fixation in the host. However, the physiological functions of most cyanobionts remain unknown. Cyanobionts have been found in numerous protist groups, including dinoflagellates, tintinnids, radiolarians, amoebae, diatoms, and haptophytes. Among these cyanobionts, little is known regarding the nature (e.g., genetic diversity, host or cyanobiont specificity, and cyanobiont seasonality) of the symbiosis involved, particularly in relation to dinoflagellate host.

=== Collective behaviour ===
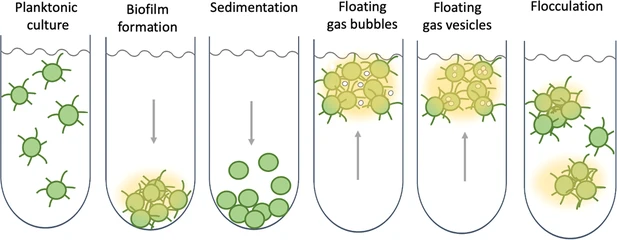
Collective behaviour and buoyancy strategies in single-celled cyanobacteria

Some cyanobacteria – even single-celled ones – show striking collective behaviours and form colonies (or blooms) that can float on water and have important ecological roles. For instance, billions of years ago, communities of marine Paleoproterozoic cyanobacteria could have helped create the biosphere as we know it by burying carbon compounds and allowing the initial build-up of oxygen in the atmosphere. On the other hand, toxic cyanobacterial blooms are an increasing issue for society, as their toxins can be harmful to animals. Extreme blooms can also deplete water of oxygen and reduce the penetration of sunlight and visibility, thereby compromising the feeding and mating behaviour of light-reliant species.

As shown in the diagram on the right, bacteria can stay in suspension as individual cells, adhere collectively to surfaces to form biofilms, passively sediment, or flocculate to form suspended aggregates. Cyanobacteria are able to produce sulphated polysaccharides (yellow haze surrounding clumps of cells) that enable them to form floating aggregates. In 2021, Maeda et al. discovered that oxygen produced by cyanobacteria becomes trapped in the network of polysaccharides and cells, enabling the microorganisms to form buoyant blooms. It is thought that specific protein fibres known as pili (represented as lines radiating from the cells) may act as an additional way to link cells to each other or onto surfaces. Some cyanobacteria also use sophisticated intracellular gas vesicles as floatation aids.

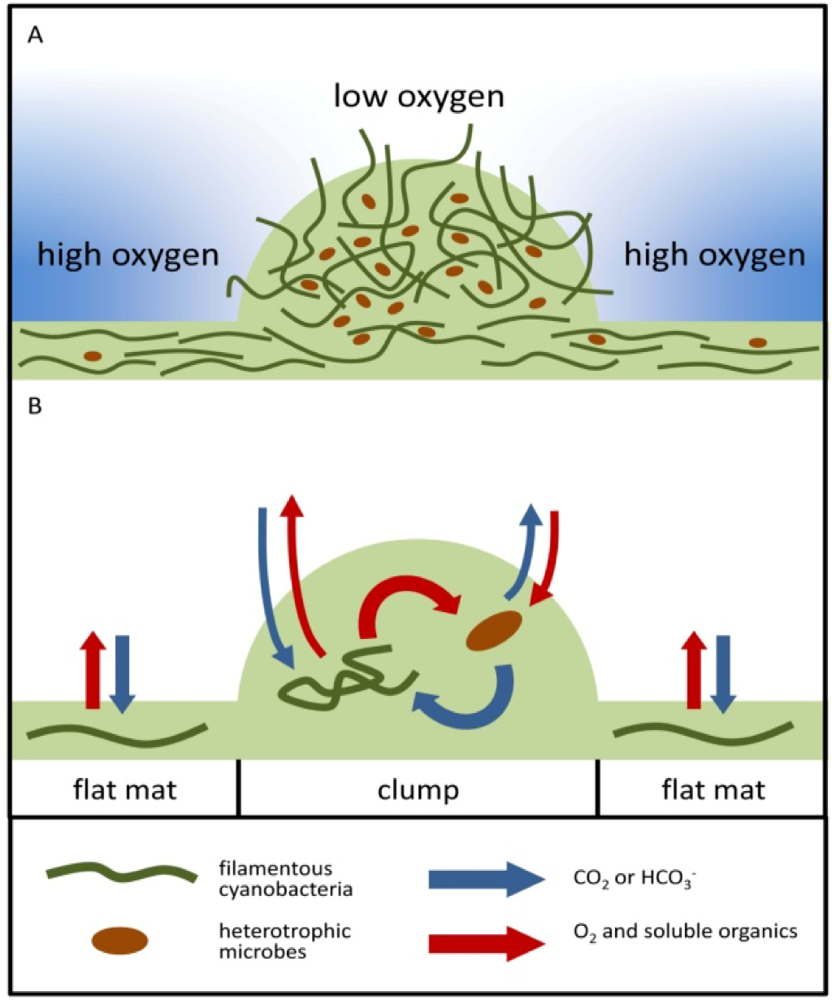
Model of a clumped cyanobacterial mat

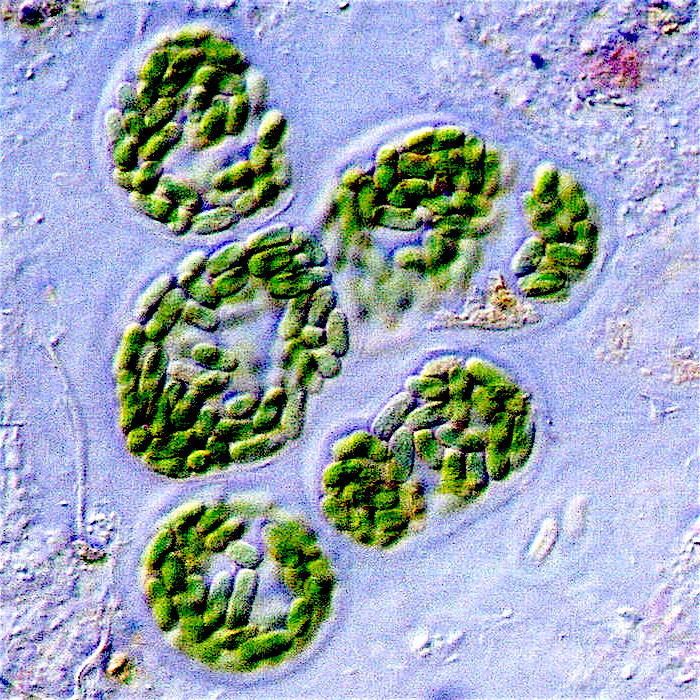
Light microscope view of cyanobacteria from a microbial mat

The diagram on the left above shows a proposed model of microbial distribution, spatial organization, carbon and O_{2} cycling in clumps and adjacent areas. (a) Clumps contain denser cyanobacterial filaments and heterotrophic microbes. The initial differences in density depend on cyanobacterial motility and can be established over short timescales. Darker blue color outside of the clump indicates higher oxygen concentrations in areas adjacent to clumps. Oxic media increase the reversal frequencies of any filaments that begin to leave the clumps, thereby reducing the net migration away from the clump. This enables the persistence of the initial clumps over short timescales; (b) Spatial coupling between photosynthesis and respiration in clumps. Oxygen produced by cyanobacteria diffuses into the overlying medium or is used for aerobic respiration. Dissolved inorganic carbon (DIC) diffuses into the clump from the overlying medium and is also produced within the clump by respiration. In oxic solutions, high O_{2} concentrations reduce the efficiency of CO_{2} fixation and result in the excretion of glycolate. Under these conditions, clumping can be beneficial to cyanobacteria if it stimulates the retention of carbon and the assimilation of inorganic carbon by cyanobacteria within clumps. This effect appears to promote the accumulation of particulate organic carbon (cells, sheaths and heterotrophic organisms) in clumps.

It has been unclear why and how cyanobacteria form communities. Aggregation must divert resources away from the core business of making more cyanobacteria, as it generally involves the production of copious quantities of extracellular material. In addition, cells in the centre of dense aggregates can also suffer from both shading and shortage of nutrients. So, what advantage does this communal life bring for cyanobacteria?

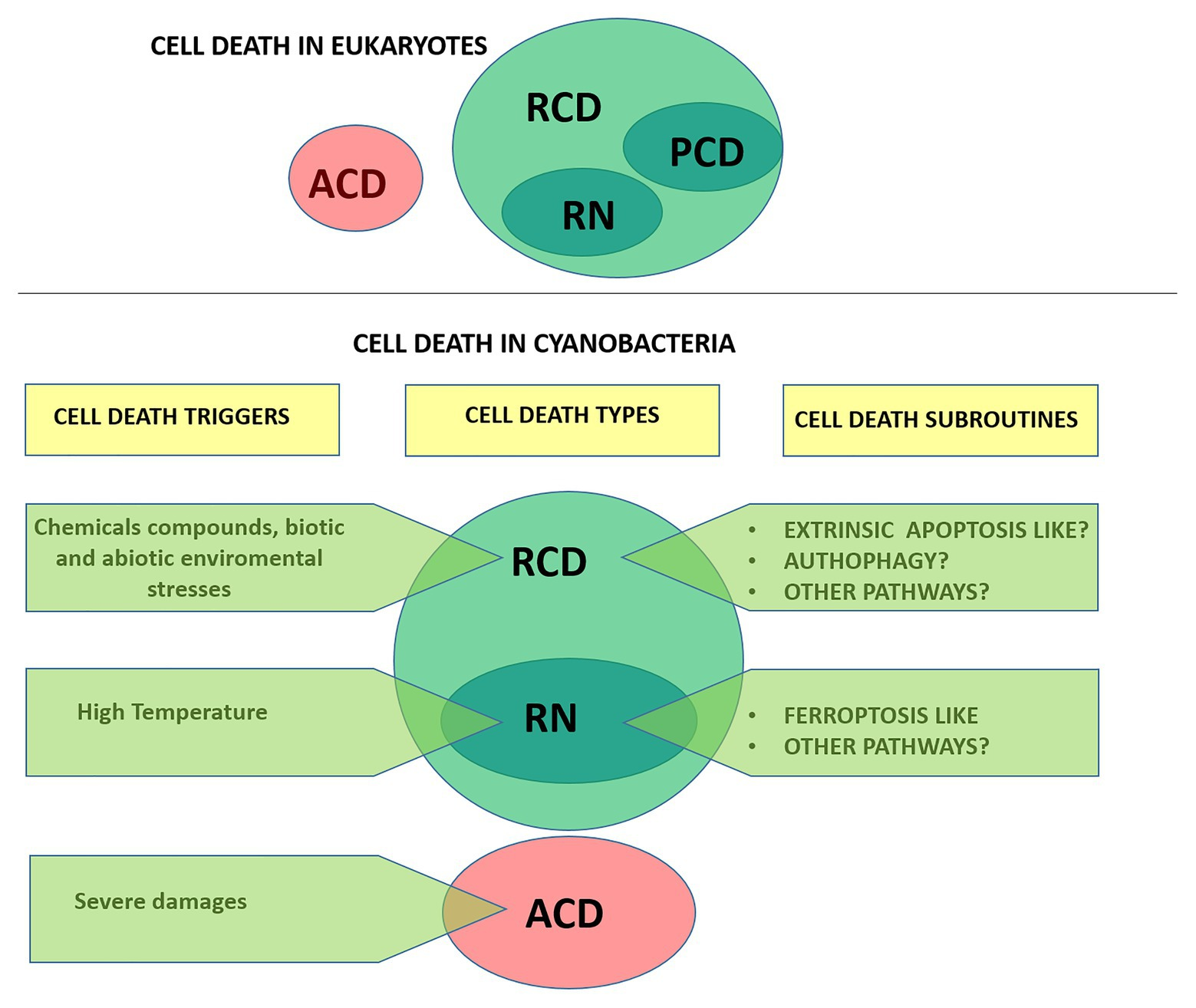
Cell death in eukaryotes and cyanobacteria Types of cell death according to the Nomenclature Committee on Cell Death (upper panel; and proposed for cyanobacteria (lower panel). Cells exposed to extreme injury die in an uncontrollable manner, reflecting the loss of structural integrity. This type of cell death is called "accidental cell death" (ACD). "Regulated cell death (RCD)" is encoded by a genetic pathway that can be modulated by genetic or pharmacologic interventions. Programmed cell death (PCD) is a type of RCD that occurs as a developmental program, and has not been addressed in cyanobacteria yet. RN, regulated necrosis.

New insights into how cyanobacteria form blooms have come from a 2021 study on the cyanobacterium Synechocystis. These use a set of genes that regulate the production and export of sulphated polysaccharides, chains of sugar molecules modified with sulphate groups that can often be found in marine algae and animal tissue. Many bacteria generate extracellular polysaccharides, but sulphated ones have only been seen in cyanobacteria. In Synechocystis these sulphated polysaccharide help the cyanobacterium form buoyant aggregates by trapping oxygen bubbles in the slimy web of cells and polysaccharides.

Previous studies on Synechocystis have shown type IV pili, which decorate the surface of cyanobacteria, also play a role in forming blooms. These retractable and adhesive protein fibres are important for motility, adhesion to substrates and DNA uptake. The formation of blooms may require both type IV pili and Synechan – for example, the pili may help to export the polysaccharide outside the cell. Indeed, the activity of these protein fibres may be connected to the production of extracellular polysaccharides in filamentous cyanobacteria. A more obvious answer would be that pili help to build the aggregates by binding the cells with each other or with the extracellular polysaccharide. As with other kinds of bacteria, certain components of the pili may allow cyanobacteria from the same species to recognise each other and make initial contacts, which are then stabilised by building a mass of extracellular polysaccharide.

The bubble flotation mechanism identified by Maeda et al. joins a range of known strategies that enable cyanobacteria to control their buoyancy, such as using gas vesicles or accumulating carbohydrate ballasts. Type IV pili on their own could also control the position of marine cyanobacteria in the water column by regulating viscous drag. Extracellular polysaccharide appears to be a multipurpose asset for cyanobacteria, from floatation device to food storage, defence mechanism and mobility aid.

=== Cellular death ===
One of the most critical processes determining cyanobacterial eco-physiology is cellular death. Evidence supports the existence of controlled cellular demise in cyanobacteria, and various forms of cell death have been described as a response to biotic and abiotic stresses. However, cell death research in cyanobacteria is a relatively young field and understanding of the underlying mechanisms and molecular machinery underpinning this fundamental process remains largely elusive. However, reports on cell death of marine and freshwater cyanobacteria indicate this process has major implications for the ecology of microbial communities/ Different forms of cell demise have been observed in cyanobacteria under several stressful conditions, and cell death has been suggested to play a key role in developmental processes, such as akinete and heterocyst differentiation, as well as strategy for population survival.

Programmed cell death and microcystins

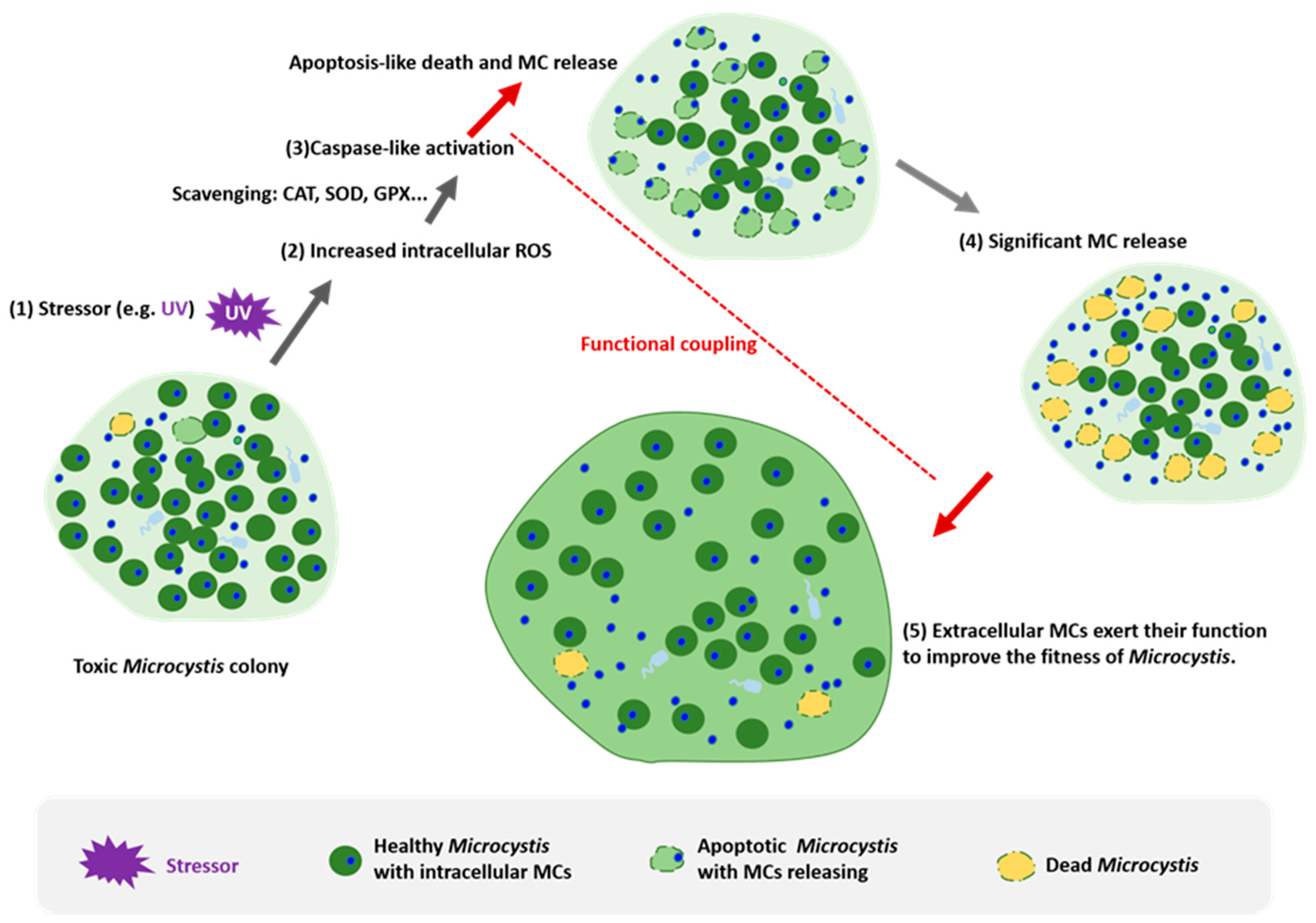

A hypothetical conceptual model couples programmed cell death and the role of microcystins in Microcystis. (1) The extracellular stressor (e.g., ultraviolet radiation) acts on the cell. (2) Intracellular oxidative stress increases; the intracellular reactive oxygen species content exceeds the antioxidative capacity of the cell (mediated mostly by an enzymatic system involving a superoxide dismutase, catalase, and glutathione peroxidase) and causes molecular damage. (3) The damage further activates the caspase-like activity, and apoptosis-like death is initiated. Simultaneously, intracellular microcystins begin to be released into the extracellular environment. (4) The extracellular microcystins have been significantly released from dead Microcystis cells. (5) They act on the remaining Microcystis cells, and exert extracellular roles, for example, extracellular microcystins can increase the production of extracellular polysaccharides that are involved in colony formation. Eventually, the colonial form improves the survival of the remaining cells under stressful conditions.

=== Cyanophages ===
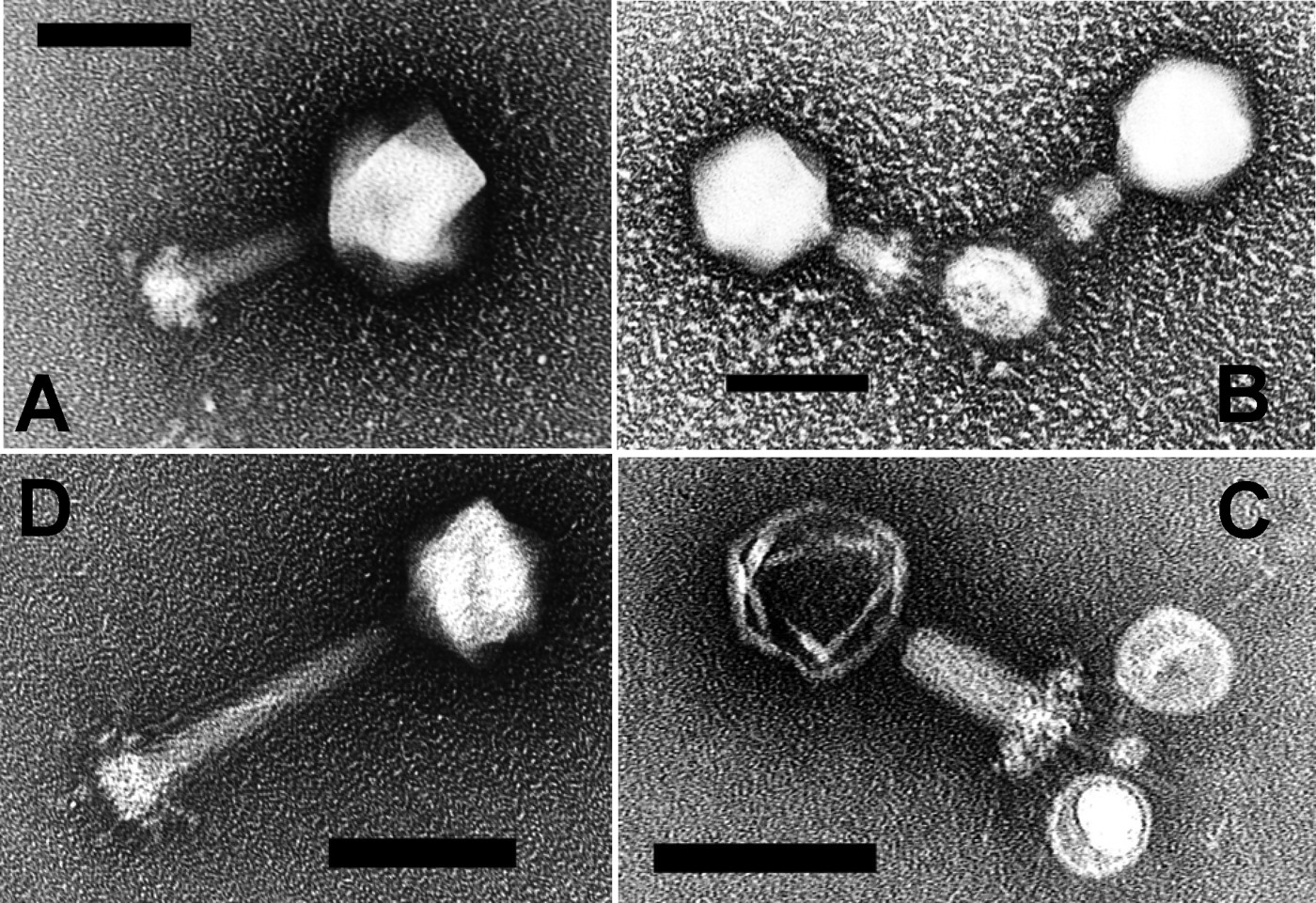
Electron micrograph of negative-stained Prochlorococcus myoviruses

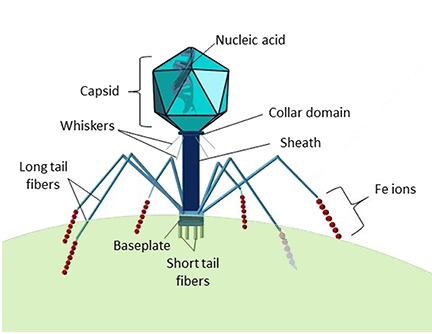
Typical structure of a myovirus

Cyanophages are viruses that infect cyanobacteria. Cyanophages can be found in both freshwater and marine environments. Marine and freshwater cyanophages have icosahedral heads, which contain double-stranded DNA, attached to a tail by connector proteins. The size of the head and tail vary among species of cyanophages. Cyanophages, like other bacteriophages, rely on Brownian motion to collide with bacteria, and then use receptor binding proteins to recognize cell surface proteins, which leads to adherence. Viruses with contractile tails then rely on receptors found on their tails to recognize highly conserved proteins on the surface of the host cell.

Cyanophages infect a wide range of cyanobacteria and are key regulators of the cyanobacterial populations in aquatic environments, and may aid in the prevention of cyanobacterial blooms in freshwater and marine ecosystems. These blooms can pose a danger to humans and other animals, particularly in eutrophic freshwater lakes. Infection by these viruses is highly prevalent in cells belonging to Synechococcus spp. in marine environments, where up to 5% of cells belonging to marine cyanobacterial cells have been reported to contain mature phage particles.

The first cyanophage, LPP-1, was discovered in 1963. Cyanophages are classified within the bacteriophage families Myoviridae (e.g. AS-1, N-1), Podoviridae (e.g. LPP-1) and Siphoviridae (e.g. S-1).

== Movement ==
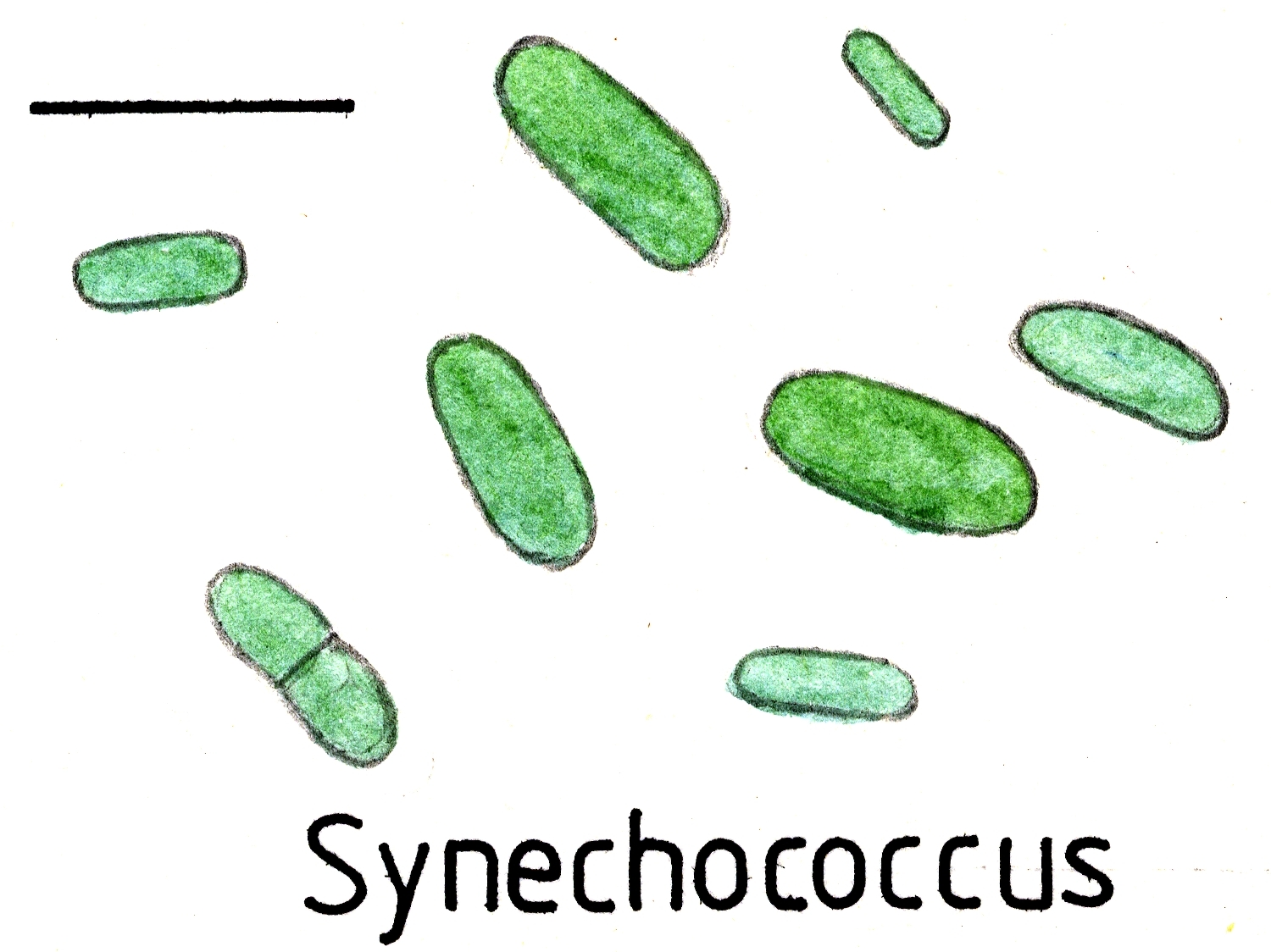
Synechococcus uses a gliding technique to move at 25 μm/s. Scale bar is about 10 μm.

It has long been known that filamentous cyanobacteria perform surface motions, and that these movements result from type IV pili. Additionally, Synechococcus, a marine cyanobacteria, is known to swim at a speed of 25 μm/s by a mechanism different to that of bacterial flagella. Formation of waves on the cyanobacteria surface is thought to push surrounding water backwards. Cells are known to be motile by a gliding method and a novel uncharacterized, non-phototactic swimming method that does not involve flagellar motion.

Many species of cyanobacteria are capable of gliding. Gliding is a form of cell movement that differs from crawling or swimming in that it does not rely on any obvious external organ or change in cell shape and it occurs only in the presence of a substrate. Gliding in filamentous cyanobacteria appears to be powered by a "slime jet" mechanism, in which the cells extrude a gel that expands quickly as it hydrates providing a propulsion force, although some unicellular cyanobacteria use type IV pili for gliding.

Cyanobacteria have strict light requirements. Too little light can result in insufficient energy production, and in some species may cause the cells to resort to heterotrophic respiration. Too much light can inhibit the cells, decrease photosynthesis efficiency and cause damage by bleaching. UV radiation is especially deadly for cyanobacteria, with normal solar levels being significantly detrimental for these microorganisms in some cases.

Filamentous cyanobacteria that live in microbial mats often migrate vertically and horizontally within the mat in order to find an optimal niche that balances their light requirements for photosynthesis against their sensitivity to photodamage. For example, the filamentous cyanobacteria Oscillatoria sp. and Spirulina subsalsa found in the hypersaline benthic mats of Guerrero Negro, Mexico migrate downwards into the lower layers during the day in order to escape the intense sunlight and then rise to the surface at dusk. In contrast, the population of Microcoleus chthonoplastes found in hypersaline mats in Camargue, France migrate to the upper layer of the mat during the day and are spread homogeneously through the mat at night. An in vitro experiment using Phormidium uncinatum also demonstrated this species' tendency to migrate in order to avoid damaging radiation. These migrations are usually the result of some sort of photomovement, although other forms of taxis can also play a role.

Photomovement – the modulation of cell movement as a function of the incident light – is employed by the cyanobacteria as a means to find optimal light conditions in their environment. There are three types of photomovement: photokinesis, phototaxis and photophobic responses.

Photokinetic microorganisms modulate their gliding speed according to the incident light intensity. For example, the speed with which Phormidium autumnale glides increases linearly with the incident light intensity.

Phototactic microorganisms move according to the direction of the light within the environment, such that positively phototactic species will tend to move roughly parallel to the light and towards the light source. Species such as Phormidium uncinatum cannot steer directly towards the light, but rely on random collisions to orient themselves in the right direction, after which they tend to move more towards the light source. Others, such as Anabaena variabilis, can steer by bending the trichome.

Finally, photophobic microorganisms respond to spatial and temporal light gradients. A step-up photophobic reaction occurs when an organism enters a brighter area field from a darker one and then reverses direction, thus avoiding the bright light. The opposite reaction, called a step-down reaction, occurs when an organism enters a dark area from a bright area and then reverses direction, thus remaining in the light.

== Evolution ==
=== Earth history ===
Life timeline
← / Earth formed; ← / Earliest water; ← / LUCA; ← / Earliest fossils; ← / Great Oxygenation Event; ← / Sexual reproduction; ← / Earliest fungi; ← / Neoproterozoic oxygenation event; ← / Ediacaran biota; ← / Cambrian explosion; ← / Earliest tetrapods; ← / Earliest hominoid
(million years ago)

Stromatolites are layered biochemical accretionary structures formed in shallow water by the trapping, binding, and cementation of sedimentary grains by biofilms (microbial mats) of microorganisms, especially cyanobacteria.

Cyanobacteria likely first evolved in a freshwater environment. During the Precambrian, stromatolite communities of microorganisms grew in most marine and non-marine environments in the photic zone. After the Cambrian explosion of marine animals, grazing on the stromatolite mats by herbivores greatly reduced the occurrence of the stromatolites in marine environments. Since then, they are found mostly in hypersaline conditions where grazing invertebrates cannot live (e.g. Shark Bay, Western Australia). Stromatolites provide ancient records of life on Earth by fossil remains which date from 3.5 Ga ago. The oldest undisputed evidence of cyanobacteria is dated to be 2.1 Ga ago, but there is some evidence for them as far back as 2.7 Ga ago. Cyanobacteria might have also emerged 3.5 Ga ago. Oxygen concentrations in the atmosphere remained around or below 0.001% of today's level until 2.4 Ga ago (the Great Oxygenation Event). The rise in oxygen may have caused a fall in the concentration of atmospheric methane, and triggered the Huronian glaciation from around 2.4 to 2.1 Ga ago. In this way, cyanobacteria may have killed off most of the other bacteria of the time.

Oncolites are sedimentary structures composed of oncoids, which are layered structures formed by cyanobacterial growth. Oncolites are similar to stromatolites, but instead of forming columns, they form approximately spherical structures that were not attached to the underlying substrate as they formed. The oncoids often form around a central nucleus, such as a shell fragment, and a calcium carbonate structure is deposited by encrusting microbes. Oncolites are indicators of warm waters in the photic zone, but are also known in contemporary freshwater environments. These structures rarely exceed 10 cm in diameter.

One former classification scheme of cyanobacterial fossils divided them into the porostromata and the spongiostromata. These are now recognized as form taxa and considered taxonomically obsolete; however, some authors have advocated for the terms remaining informally to describe form and structure of bacterial fossils.

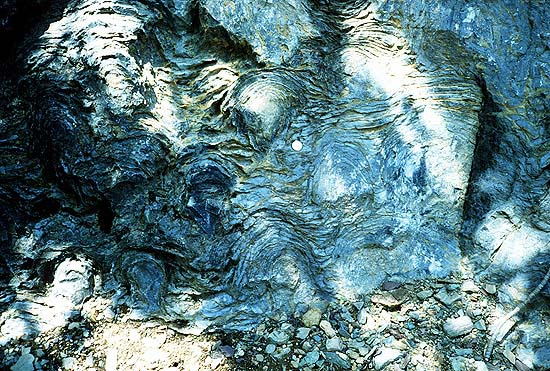
Stromatolites left behind by cyanobacteria are the oldest known fossils of life on Earth. This fossil is one billion years old.

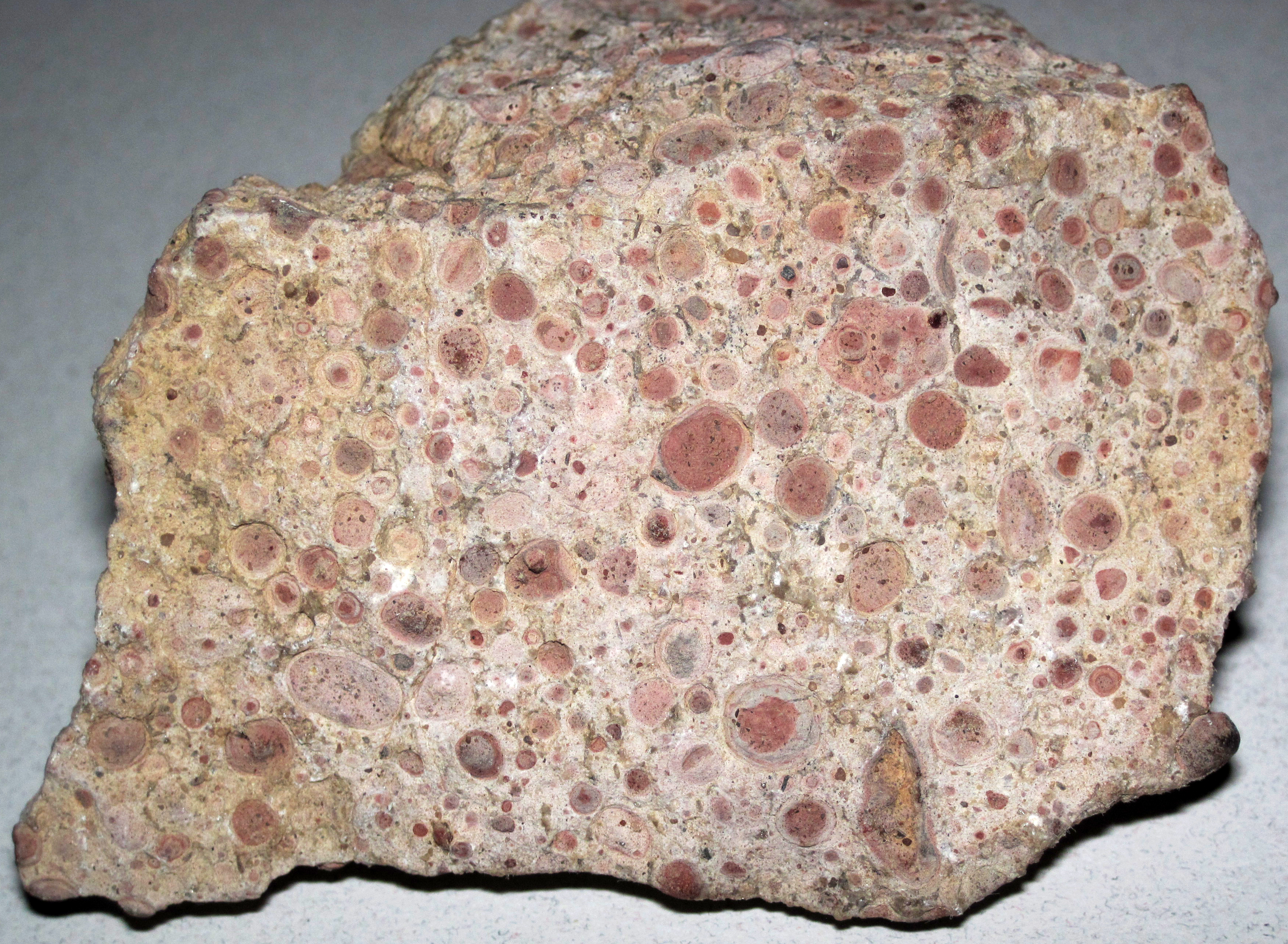
Oncolitic limestone formed from successive layers of calcium carbonate precipitated by cyanobacteria

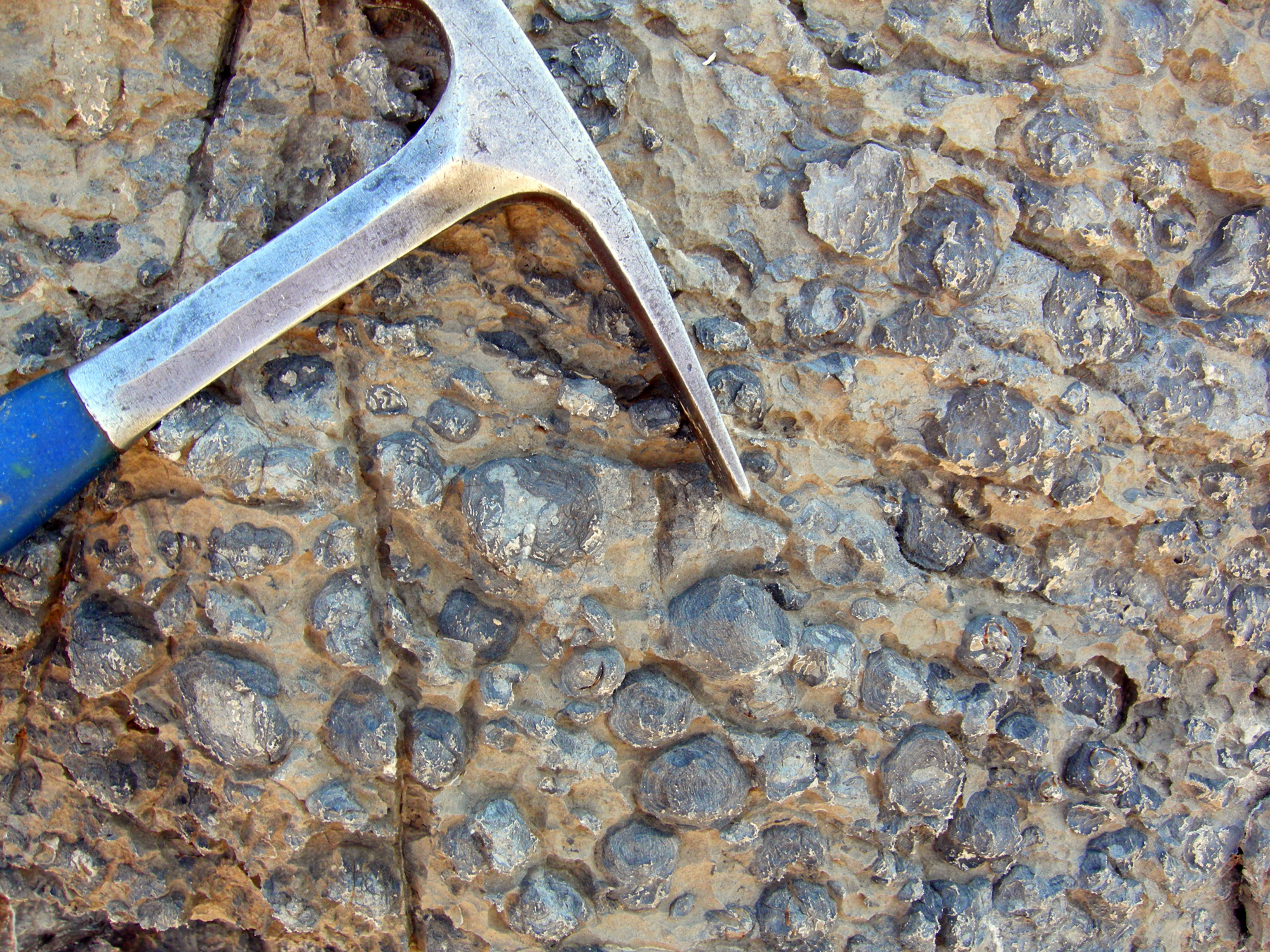
Oncolites from the Late Devonian Alamo bolide impact in Nevada

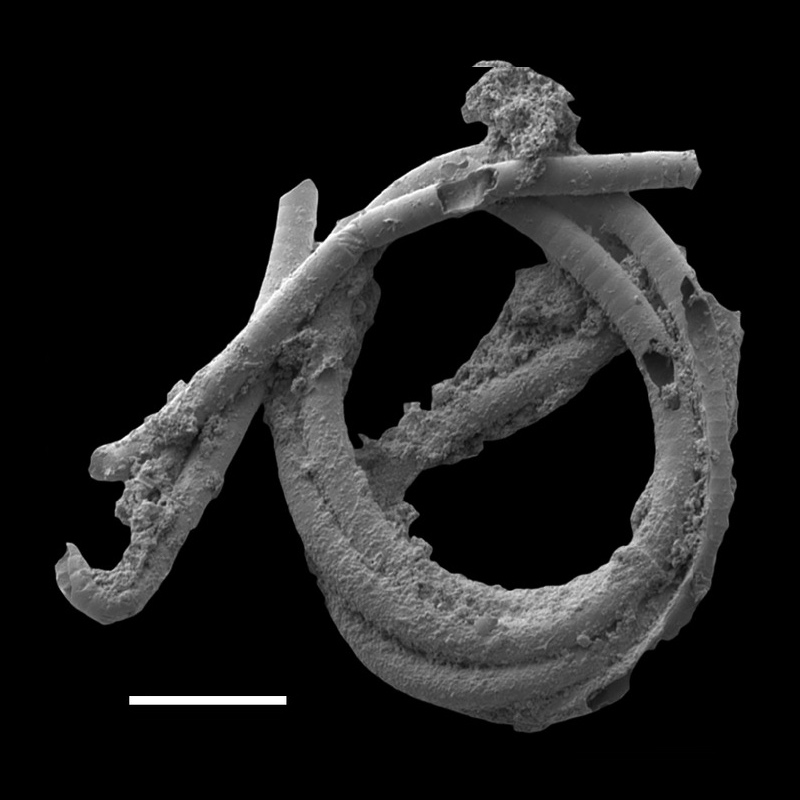
Cyanobacterial remains of an annulated tubular microfossil Oscillatoriopsis longa
Scale bar: 100 μm

=== Origin of photosynthesis ===
Oxygenic photosynthesis only evolved once (in prokaryotic cyanobacteria), and all photosynthetic eukaryotes (including all plants and algae) have acquired this ability from endosymbiosis with cyanobacteria or their endosymbiont hosts. In other words, all the oxygen that makes the atmosphere breathable for aerobic organisms originally comes from cyanobacteria or their plastid descendants.

Cyanobacteria remained the principal primary producers throughout the latter half of the Archean eon and most of the Proterozoic eon, in part because the redox structure of the oceans favored photoautotrophs capable of nitrogen fixation. However, their population is argued to have varied considerably across this eon. Archaeplastids such as green and red algae eventually surpassed cyanobacteria as major primary producers on continental shelves near the end of the Neoproterozoic, but only with the Mesozoic (251–65 Ma) radiations of secondary photoautotrophs such as dinoflagellates, coccolithophorids and diatoms did primary production in marine shelf waters take modern form. Cyanobacteria remain critical to marine ecosystems as primary producers in oceanic gyres, as agents of biological nitrogen fixation, and, in modified form, as the plastids of marine algae.

=== Origin of chloroplasts ===
Primary chloroplasts are cell organelles found in some eukaryotic lineages, where they are specialized in performing photosynthesis. They are considered to have evolved from endosymbiotic cyanobacteria. After some years of debate, it is now generally accepted that the three major groups of primary endosymbiotic eukaryotes (i.e. green plants, red algae and glaucophytes) form one large monophyletic group called Archaeplastida, which evolved after one unique endosymbiotic event.

The morphological similarity between chloroplasts and cyanobacteria was first reported by German botanist Andreas Franz Wilhelm Schimper in the 19th century Chloroplasts are only found in plants and algae, thus paving the way for Russian biologist Konstantin Mereschkowski to suggest in 1905 the symbiogenic origin of the plastid. Lynn Margulis brought this hypothesis back to attention more than 60 years later but the idea did not become fully accepted until supplementary data started to accumulate. The cyanobacterial origin of plastids is now supported by various pieces of phylogenetic, genomic, biochemical and structural evidence. The description of another independent and more recent primary endosymbiosis event between a cyanobacterium and a separate eukaryote lineage (the rhizarian Paulinella chromatophora) also gives credibility to the endosymbiotic origin of the plastids.

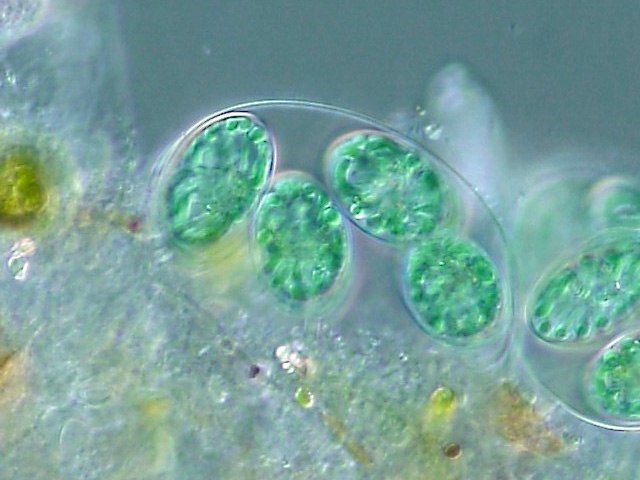
The chloroplasts of glaucophytes have a peptidoglycan layer, evidence suggesting their endosymbiotic origin from cyanobacteria.

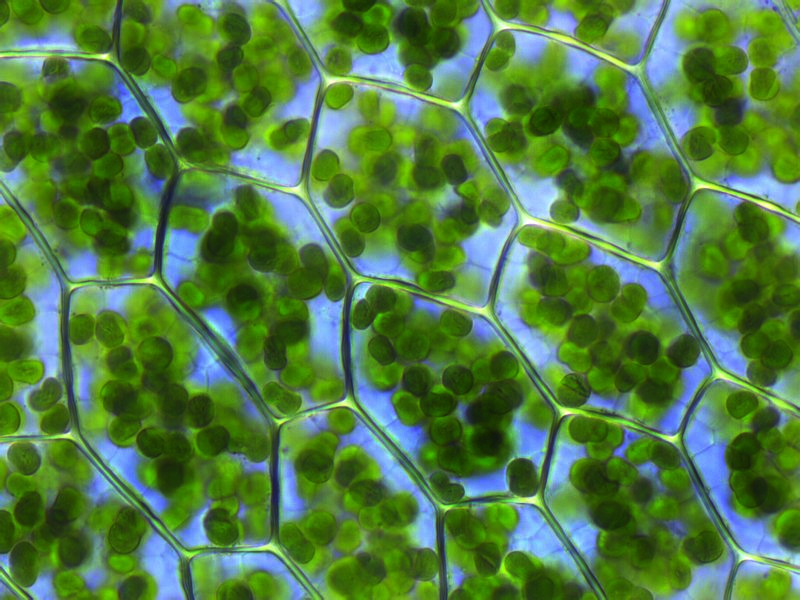
Plant cells with visible chloroplasts (from a moss, Plagiomnium affine)

In addition to this primary endosymbiosis, many eukaryotic lineages have been subject to secondary or even tertiary endosymbiotic events, that is the "Matryoshka-like" engulfment by a eukaryote of another plastid-bearing eukaryote. For example, the ciliate Mesodinium rubrum can perform photosynthesis from kleptoplasty of secondary algae known as cryptomonads, which contain endosymbiont red algae, whose chloroplasts originate from endosymbiosis of cyanobacteria.

Chloroplasts have many similarities with cyanobacteria, including a circular chromosome, prokaryotic-type ribosomes, and similar proteins in the photosynthetic reaction center. The endosymbiotic theory suggests that photosynthetic bacteria were acquired (by endocytosis) by early eukaryotic cells to form the first plant cells. Therefore, chloroplasts may be photosynthetic bacteria that adapted to life inside plant cells. Like mitochondria, chloroplasts still possess their own DNA, separate from the nuclear DNA of their plant host cells and the genes in this chloroplast DNA resemble those in cyanobacteria. DNA in chloroplasts codes for redox proteins such as photosynthetic reaction centers. The CoRR hypothesis proposes this co-location is required for redox regulation.

=== Origin of marine planktonic cyanobacteria ===
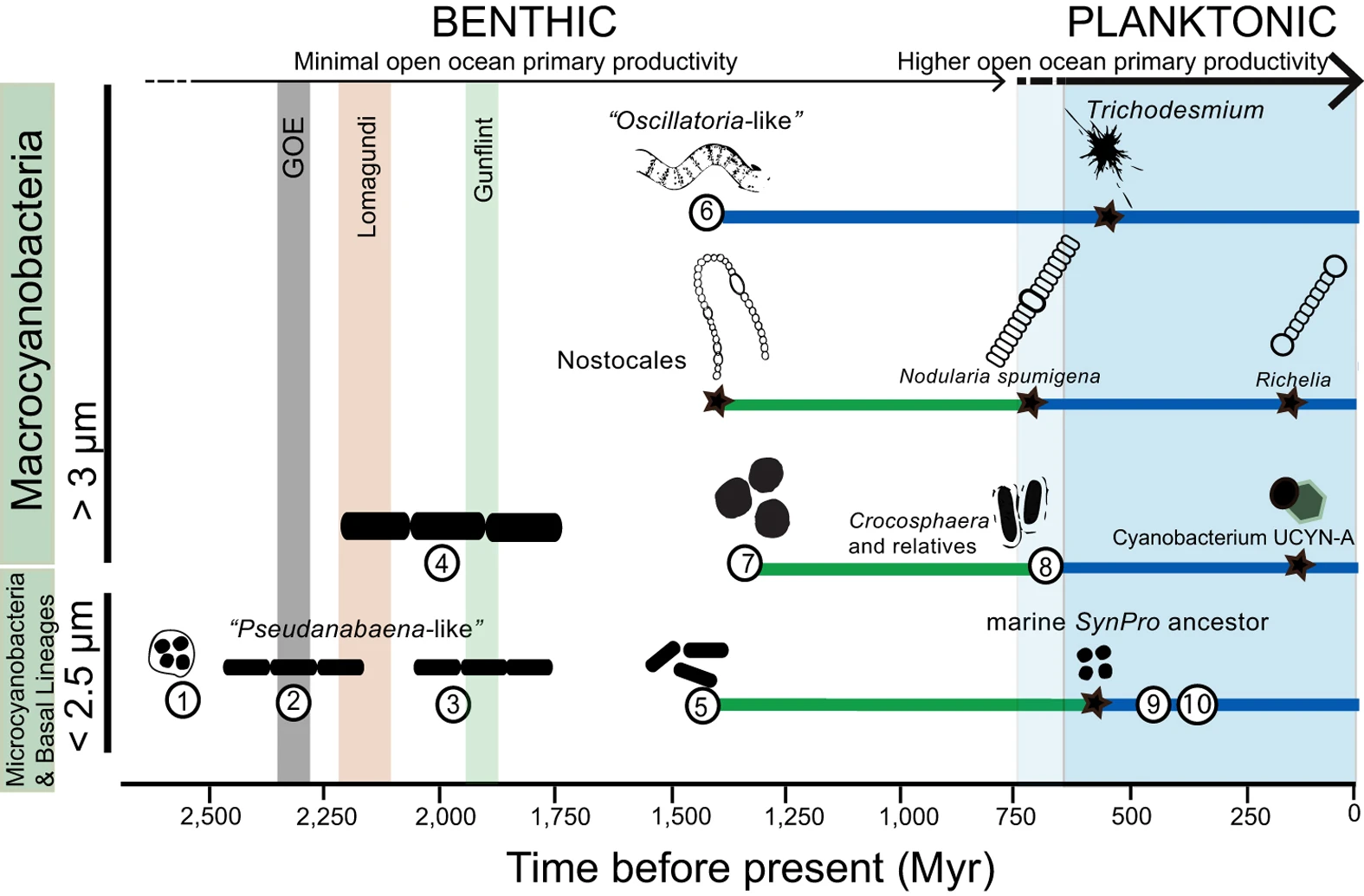
Timing and trends in cell diameter, loss of filamentous forms and habitat preference within cyanobacteria Based on data: nodes (1–10) and stars representing common ancestors from Sánchez-Baracaldo et al., 2015, timing of the Great Oxidation Event (GOE), the Lomagundi-Jatuli Excursion, and Gunflint formation. Green lines represent freshwater lineages and blue lines represent marine lineages are based on Bayesian inference of character evolution (stochastic character mapping analyses). Taxa are not drawn to scale – those with smaller cell diameters are at the bottom and larger at the top

Cyanobacteria have fundamentally transformed the geochemistry of the planet. Multiple lines of geochemical evidence support the occurrence of intervals of profound global environmental change at the beginning and end of the Proterozoic (2,500–542 Mya). While it is widely accepted that the presence of molecular oxygen in the early fossil record was the result of cyanobacteria activity, little is known about how cyanobacteria evolution (e.g., habitat preference) may have contributed to changes in biogeochemical cycles through Earth history. Geochemical evidence has indicated that there was a first step-increase in the oxygenation of the Earth's surface, which is known as the Great Oxidation Event (GOE), in the early Paleoproterozoic (2,500–1,600 Mya). A second but much steeper increase in oxygen levels, known as the Neoproterozoic Oxygenation Event (NOE), occurred at around 800 to 500 Mya. Recent chromium isotope data point to low levels of atmospheric oxygen in the Earth's surface during the mid-Proterozoic, which is consistent with the late evolution of marine planktonic cyanobacteria during the Cryogenian; both types of evidence help explain the late emergence and diversification of animals.

Understanding the evolution of planktonic cyanobacteria is important because their origin fundamentally transformed the nitrogen and carbon cycles towards the end of the Pre-Cambrian. It remains unclear, however, what evolutionary events led to the emergence of open-ocean planktonic forms within cyanobacteria and how these events relate to geochemical evidence during the Pre-Cambrian. So far, it seems that ocean geochemistry (e.g., euxinic conditions during the early- to mid-Proterozoic) and nutrient availability likely contributed to the apparent delay in diversification and widespread colonization of open ocean environments by planktonic cyanobacteria during the Neoproterozoic.

== Genetics ==
Cyanobacteria are capable of natural genetic transformation. Natural genetic transformation is the genetic alteration of a cell resulting from the direct uptake and incorporation of exogenous DNA from its surroundings. For bacterial transformation to take place, the recipient bacteria must be in a state of competence, which may occur in nature as a response to conditions such as starvation, high cell density or exposure to DNA damaging agents. In chromosomal transformation, homologous transforming DNA can be integrated into the recipient genome by homologous recombination, and this process appears to be an adaptation for repairing DNA damage.

=== DNA repair ===
Cyanobacteria are challenged by environmental stresses and internally generated reactive oxygen species that cause DNA damage. Cyanobacteria possess numerous E. coli-like DNA repair genes. Several DNA repair genes are highly conserved in cyanobacteria, even in small genomes, suggesting that core DNA repair processes such as recombinational repair, nucleotide excision repair and methyl-directed DNA mismatch repair are common among cyanobacteria.

== Classification ==
=== Taxonomy ===
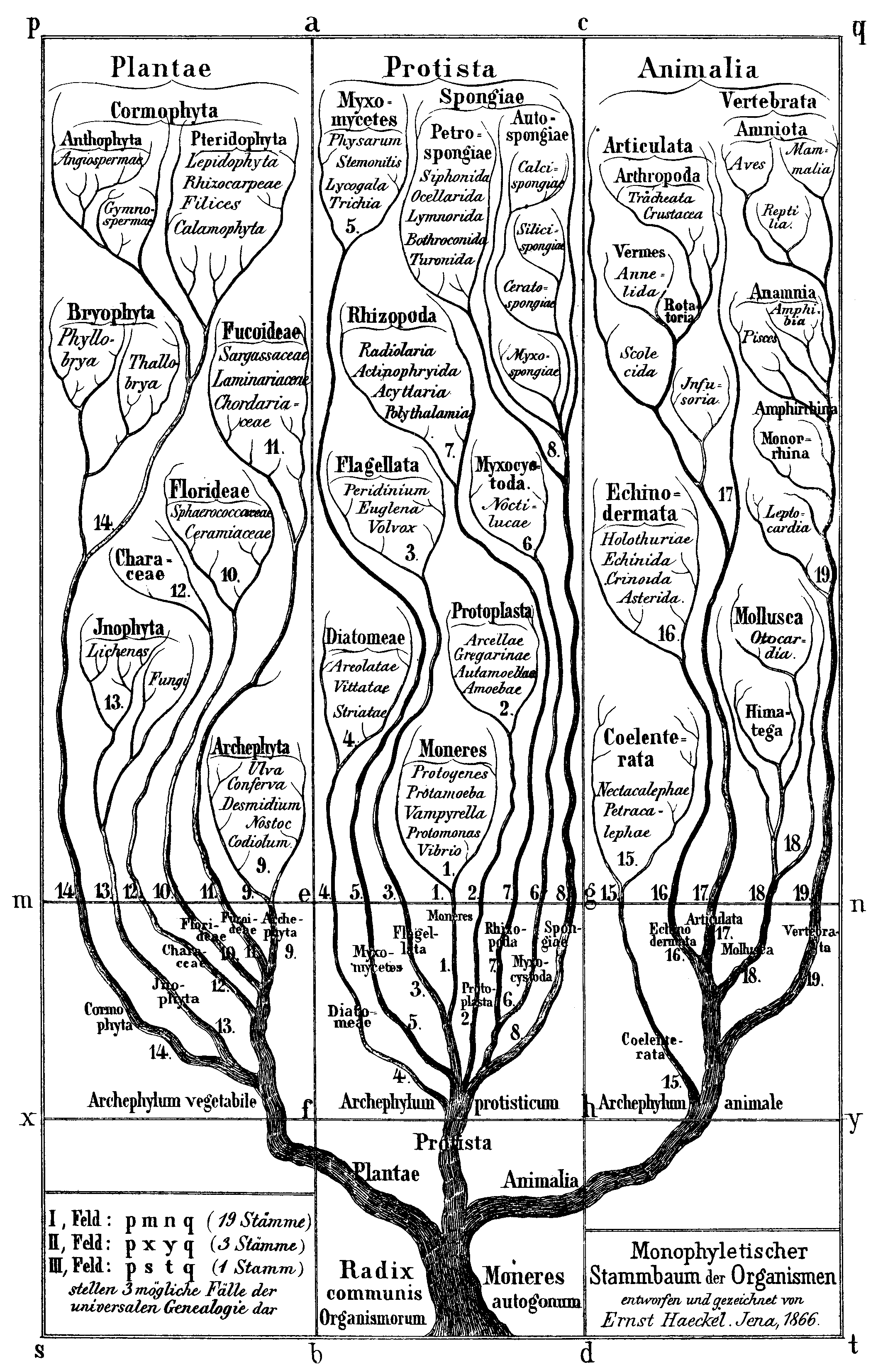
Tree of Life in Generelle Morphologie der Organismen (1866). Note the location of the genus Nostoc with algae and not with bacteria (kingdom "Monera")

Historically, bacteria were first classified as plants constituting the class Schizomycetes, which along with the Schizophyceae (blue-green algae/Cyanobacteria) formed the phylum Schizophyta, then in the phylum Monera in the kingdom Protista by Haeckel in 1866, comprising Protogens, Protamaeba, Vampyrella, Protomonae, and Vibrio, but not Nostoc and other cyanobacteria, which were classified with algae, later reclassified as the Prokaryotes by Chatton.

The cyanobacteria were traditionally classified by morphology into five sections, referred to by the numerals I–V. The first three – Chroococcales, Pleurocapsales, and Oscillatoriales – are not supported by phylogenetic studies. The latter two – Nostocales and Stigonematales – are monophyletic as a unit, and make up the heterocystous cyanobacteria.

The members of Chroococales are unicellular and usually aggregate in colonies. The classic taxonomic criterion has been the cell morphology and the plane of cell division. In Pleurocapsales, the cells have the ability to form internal spores (baeocytes). The rest of the sections include filamentous species. In Oscillatoriales, the cells are uniseriately arranged and do not form specialized cells (akinetes and heterocysts). In Nostocales and Stigonematales, the cells have the ability to develop heterocysts in certain conditions. Stigonematales, unlike Nostocales, include species with truly branched trichomes.

Formerly, some bacteria, like Beggiatoa, were thought to be colorless Cyanobacteria.

Like other bacteria, cyanobacterial taxonomy was traditionally based on morphology. Unlike the Prokaryotic Code which sets the nomenclatural starting point at 1980, the Botanical Code (International Code of Nomenclature for algae, fungi, and plants [ICNafp], which most cyanobacteria taxa are published under) uses a much earlier date of 1753, producing a much longer list of legitimate names. It also does not require live cultures to be kept, instead relying on preserved herbarium specimens, which has slightly slowed the coverage of molecular phylogeny to individual species. The limited (but growing) collection of molecular data has identified numerous disagreements between morphological classification and the natural history of taxa, leading to several overhauls on the taxonomy. Two recent, nomenclaturally legetimate, overhauls include the "polyphasic" (mainly 16S supplemented by morphology) approach of Komarek et al. (2014) and the "phylogenomic and polyphasic" (mainly 16S grafted onto a phylogenomic backbone) approach of Strunecký et al. (2023).

==== The Code question ====
The nomenclature of cyanobacteria remains mainly based on the Botanical Code as of 2021. Despite occasional proposals to forgo the historical baggage and start anew under the Prokaryotic Code, most researchers were unwilling to take on the clerical work of re-documenting almost every taxon under a different code. As of 2022, the following cyanobacterial taxa are validly published under the International Code of Nomenclature of Prokaryotes (ICNP):

- The phylum Cyanobacteriota
- The families Prochloraceae and Prochlorotrichaceae
- The genera Cyanobacterium, Halospirulina, Planktothricoides, Prochlorococcus, Prochloron, and Prochlorothrix

The Botanical Code has long recognized names validly published under the Prokaryotic Code as valid. In 2022, the Prokaryotic Code was amended to reciprocate and accept names from the botanical side. Among other effects, this allows families (and higher taxa) based on a genus name from the Botanical Code to be published under the Prokaryotic Code, enabling bacteriologists to handle and rearrange the botanical names like they are already allowed to with the bacteriological names.

=== Current taxonomy ===
The currently accepted taxonomy as of 2025 is based on National Center for Biotechnology Information (NCBI). More authoritative sources include List of Prokaryotic names with Standing in Nomenclature (LPSN) and AlgaeBase. The 2023 summary by Strunecký et al. is also useful.

- Class Cyanophyceae
  - Order Acaryochloridales Miyashita et al. 2003 ex Strunecký & Mareš 2022 (syn. "Thermosynechococcales")
    - Family Thermosynechococcaceae
  - Order Aegeococcales Strunecký & Mareš 2022
  - Order Chroococcales (synonyms Pleurocapsales)
  - Order Chroococcidiopsidales
  - Order Coleofasciculales
  - Order Desertifilales
  - Order Geitlerinematales Strunecký & Mareš 2022
  - Order Gloeobacterales
  - Order Gloeomargaritales Moreira et al. 2016
  - Order Gomontiellales
  - Order Graniferales
  - Order Leptolyngbyales (synonym Phormidesmiales) Strunecký & Mareš 2022
  - Order Nodosilineales Strunecký & Mareš 2022
  - Order Nostocales (synonym Stigonematales)
  - Order Oculatellales (synonym Elainellales) Strunecký & Mareš 2022
  - Order Oscillatoriales
  - Order Pelonematales
  - Order Prochlorotrichales Strunecký & Mareš 2022 (PCC-9006)
    - Family Prochlorococcaceae Komárek & Strunecky 2020 {"PCC-6307"}
  - Order Sarmaellales
  - Order Spirulinales
  - Order Synechococcales Hoffmann, Komárek & Kastovsky 2005
  - Order Pseudanabaenales Hoffmann, Komárek & Kastovsky 2005 nom.nud.
  - Order Thermostichales Komárek & Strunecký 2020
- Class Vampirovibrionophyceae
  - Order Vampirovibrionales

=== Phylogeny ===
Notes:

1. The botanical and bacteriological communities disagree on the name and scope of this phylum or division. Specifically, the bacteriological community prefer the name Cyanobacteriota not necessarily including the non-photosynthetic Vampirovibrionophyceae, while the botanical community prefers the name Cyanobacteria and the inclusion of Vampirovibrionophyceae. Some bacteriologists refer to Vampirovibrionophyceae as a phylum Melainabacteria or Melainobacteriota.
  In the dedrograms below, botanical (ICNafp) names are put above the line, and bacteriological (ICNP) names below the line if it differs from the botanical. In addition, a popular bacteriological synonym for Cyanobacteriota s.s. is Cyanobacteria.
2. The discovery and study of non-photosynthetic lineages related to typical photosynthetic cyanobacteria (Cyanophyceae) is still very active. The treatment of these groups may change.
3. The GTDB tree contains a lot of links to non-existent pages because GTDB re-assigns the boundaries of taxonomic levels based on genomic divergence. The type genus of these invented taxa can be inferred from the name.
  - For example, Cyanobacteriales is formed from Cyanobacterium Rippka & Cohen-Bazire 1983 [validated 2022] (ICNP) and includes important genera such as Nostoc. It corresponds to the sum of the following orders in the 2023 taxonomy: Desertifilales, Geitlerinematales, Oscillatoriales, Spirulinales, Coleofasciculales, Chroococales, Gomontiellales, Chroococcidiopsidales, Nostocales.

16S rRNA based LTP_12_2021

- - Vampirovibrionophyceae "Melainobacteriota"
    "Vampirovibrionales"
  - Cyanobacteriota
    - Gloeobacterales
    - "Phycobacteria"
      - "Thermosynechococcales"
      - - Synechococcophycidae
          Synechococcales
        - Nostocophycidae
          - - - Pleurocapsales
              - Spirulinales
            - Chroococcales
          - - Oscillatoriales
            - Nostocales

GTDB 08-RS214 by Genome Taxonomy Database

- - "Margulisbacteria"
    - "Saganbacteria" (WOR1)
    - - "Marinamargulisbacteria"
      - - "Riflemargulisbacteria" (GWF2_35_9)
        - "Termititenacia"
  - Cyanobacteriota s. l.
    - - Vampirovibrionophyceae "Melainobacteriota"
        - - "Caenarcanales"
          - "Obscuribacterales"
        - - "Vampirovibrionales"
          - "Gastranaerophilales"
    - - "Sericytochromatia"
        - UBA7694 ("Blackallbacteria")
        - S15B-MN24 ("Sericytochromatia"; "Tanganyikabacteria")
      - Cyanobacteriota
        - - "Gloeobacteria"
            Gloeobacterales
        - - "Phycobacteria"
            ⊞
            ⊟
            - Thermostichales
            - - Pseudanabaenales (Pseudanabaena + Tumidithrix)
              - - - Gloeoemargaritales
                  - Prochlorococcaceae {PCC-6307}
                - - "Acaryochloridales"
                  - - - Synechococcophycidae
                        - "Limnothrix rosea"
                        - - Prochlorotrichales {PCC-9006}
                          - Synechococcales (Synechococcus)
                    - - - "Phormidesmiales"
                        - "Nodosilineales" (non-GTDB split)
                      - - - Oculatellales (non-GTDB split)
                          - "Elainellales"
                        - - "Leptolyngbyales"
                          - - Nostocophycidae
                              Cyanobacteriales

Example of different circumscriptions among sources:

- LPSN uses Cyanobacteriota s.l. with two classes, with the botanical -phyceae class suffix.
- GTDB uses Cyanobacteriota s.l. with three classes, the added one being Sericytochromatia. The bacteriological class suffix -ia is used, hence Cyanobacteriia and Vampirovibrionia.
- NCBI uses Cyanobacteriota s.s. In addition, its Cyanobacteriota/Melainabacteria group includes not only Cyanobacteriota s.l., but also "Margulisiibacteriota" and "Ca. Adamsella". (In GTDB, "Ca. Adamsella" is nested in Gastranaerophilales.)
- AlgaeBase uses Cyanobacteria with only Cyanophyceae.
- Strunecký et al. (2023) uses Cyanobacteria with two botanical classes.

== Relation to humans ==
=== Biotechnology ===
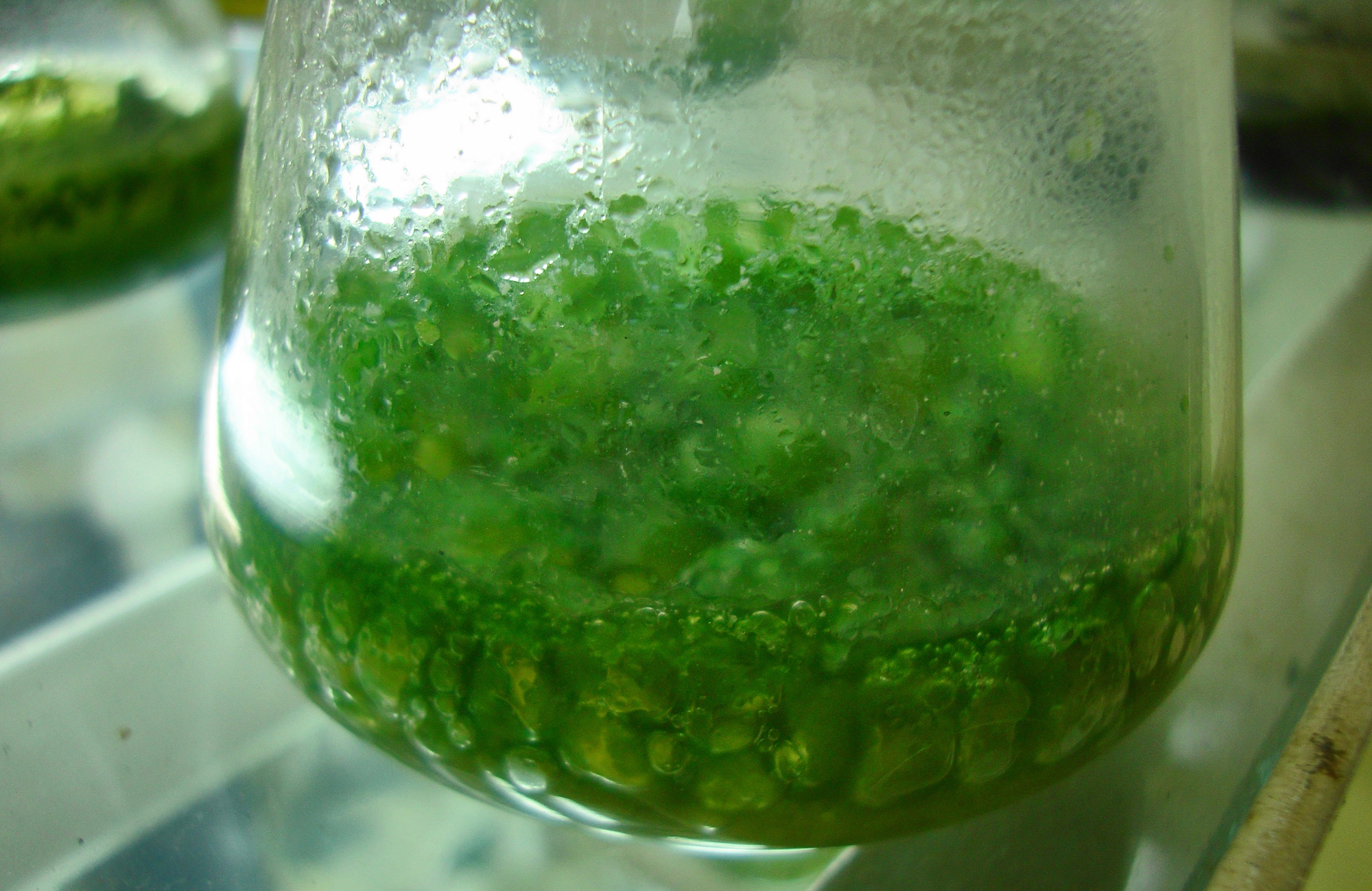
Cyanobacteria cultured in specific media: Cyanobacteria can be helpful in agriculture as they have the ability to fix atmospheric nitrogen in soil.

The unicellular cyanobacterium Synechocystis sp. PCC6803 was the third prokaryote and first photosynthetic organism whose genome was completely sequenced. It continues to be an important model organism. Crocosphaera subtropica ATCC 51142 is an important diazotrophic model organism. The smallest genomes of a photosynthetic organism have been found in Prochlorococcus spp. (1.7 Mb) and the largest in Nostoc punctiforme (9 Mb). Those of Calothrix spp. are estimated at 12–15 Mb, as large as yeast.

Recent research has suggested the potential application of cyanobacteria to the generation of renewable energy by directly converting sunlight into electricity. Internal photosynthetic pathways can be coupled to chemical mediators that transfer electrons to external electrodes. In the shorter term, efforts are underway to commercialize algae-based fuels such as diesel, gasoline, and jet fuel. Cyanobacteria have been also engineered to produce ethanol and experiments have shown that when one or two CBB genes are being over expressed, the yield can be even higher.

Cyanobacteria may possess the ability to produce substances that could one day serve as anti-inflammatory agents and combat bacterial infections in humans. Cyanobacteria's photosynthetic output of sugar and oxygen has been demonstrated to have therapeutic value in rats with heart attacks. While cyanobacteria can naturally produce various secondary metabolites, they can serve as advantageous hosts for plant-derived metabolites production owing to biotechnological advances in systems biology and synthetic biology.

Spirulina's extracted blue color is used as a natural food coloring.

Researchers from several space agencies argue that cyanobacteria could be used for producing goods for human consumption in future crewed outposts on Mars, by transforming materials available on this planet.

=== Human nutrition ===
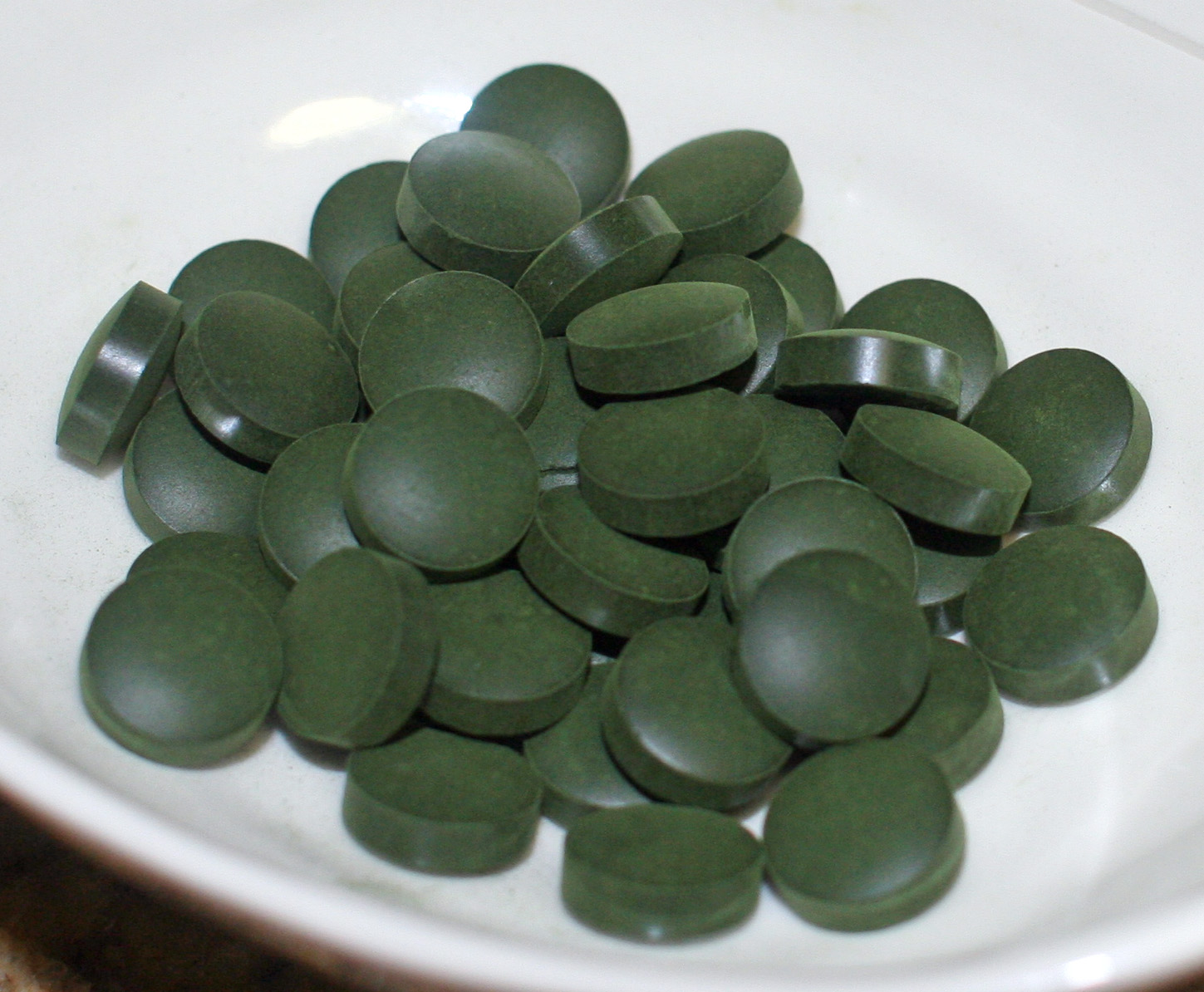
Spirulina tablets

Some cyanobacteria are sold as food, notably Limnospira platensis (spirulina), Aphanizomenon flos-aquae (Klamath Lake AFA), and others.

Some microalgae contain substances of high biological value, such as polyunsaturated fatty acids, amino acids, proteins, pigments, antioxidants, vitamins, and minerals. Edible blue-green algae reduce the production of pro-inflammatory cytokines by inhibiting NF-κB pathway in macrophages and splenocytes. Sulfate polysaccharides exhibit immunomodulatory, antitumor, antithrombotic, anticoagulant, anti-mutagenic, anti-inflammatory, antimicrobial, and even antiviral activity against HIV, herpes, and hepatitis.

=== Health risks ===
Some cyanobacteria can produce neurotoxins, cytotoxins, endotoxins, and hepatotoxins (e.g., the microcystin-producing bacteria genus microcystis), which are collectively known as cyanotoxins.

Specific toxins include anatoxin-a, guanitoxin, aplysiatoxin, cyanopeptolin, cylindrospermopsin, domoic acid, nodularin R (from Nodularia), neosaxitoxin, and saxitoxin. Cyanobacteria reproduce explosively under certain conditions. This results in algal blooms which can become harmful to other species and pose a danger to humans and animals if the cyanobacteria involved produce toxins. Several cases of human poisoning have been documented, but a lack of knowledge prevents an accurate assessment of the risks,.

Recent studies suggest that significant exposure to high levels of cyanobacteria producing toxins such as BMAA can cause amyotrophic lateral sclerosis (ALS). People living within half a mile of cyanobacterially contaminated lakes have had a 2.3 times greater risk of developing ALS than the rest of the population; people around New Hampshire's Lake Mascoma had an up to 25 times greater risk of ALS than the expected incidence. BMAA from desert crusts found throughout Qatar might have contributed to higher rates of ALS in Gulf War veterans.

=== Chemical control ===
Several chemicals can eliminate cyanobacterial blooms from smaller water-based systems such as swimming pools. They include calcium hypochlorite, copper sulphate, Cupricide (chelated copper), and simazine. The calcium hypochlorite amount needed varies depending on the cyanobacteria bloom, and treatment is needed periodically. According to the Department of Agriculture Australia, a rate of 12 g of 70% material in 1000 L of water is often effective to treat a bloom. Copper sulfate is also used commonly, but no longer recommended by the Australian Department of Agriculture, as it kills livestock, crustaceans, and fish. Cupricide is a chelated copper product that eliminates blooms with lower toxicity risks than copper sulfate. Dosage recommendations vary from 190 mL to 4.8 L per 1000 m^{2}. Ferric alum treatments at the rate of 50 mg/L will reduce algae blooms. Simazine, which is also a herbicide, will continue to kill blooms for several days after an application. Simazine is marketed at different strengths (25, 50, and 90%), the recommended amount needed for one cubic meter of water per product is 25% product 8 mL; 50% product 4 mL; or 90% product 2.2 mL.

=== Climate change ===
Climate change is likely to increase the frequency, intensity and duration of cyanobacterial blooms in many eutrophic lakes, reservoirs and estuaries. Bloom-forming cyanobacteria produce a variety of neurotoxins, hepatotoxins and dermatoxins, which can be fatal to birds and mammals (including waterfowl, cattle and dogs) and threaten the use of waters for recreation, drinking water production, agricultural irrigation and fisheries. Toxic cyanobacteria have caused major water quality problems, for example in Lake Taihu (China), Lake Erie (Canada/USA), Lake Okeechobee (USA), Lake Victoria (Africa) and the Baltic Sea.

Climate change favours cyanobacterial blooms both directly and indirectly. Many bloom-forming cyanobacteria can grow at relatively high temperatures. Increased thermal stratification of lakes and reservoirs enables buoyant cyanobacteria to float upwards and form dense surface blooms, which gives them better access to light and hence a selective advantage over nonbuoyant phytoplankton organisms. Protracted droughts during summer increase water residence times in reservoirs, rivers and estuaries, and these stagnant warm waters can provide ideal conditions for cyanobacterial bloom development.

The capacity of the harmful cyanobacterial genus Microcystis to adapt to elevated CO_{2} levels was demonstrated in both laboratory and field experiments. Microcystis spp. take up CO_{2} and HCO^{−}_{3} and accumulate inorganic carbon in carboxysomes, and strain competitiveness was found to depend on the concentration of inorganic carbon. As a result, climate change and increased CO_{2} levels are expected to affect the strain composition of cyanobacterial blooms.

== Gallery ==
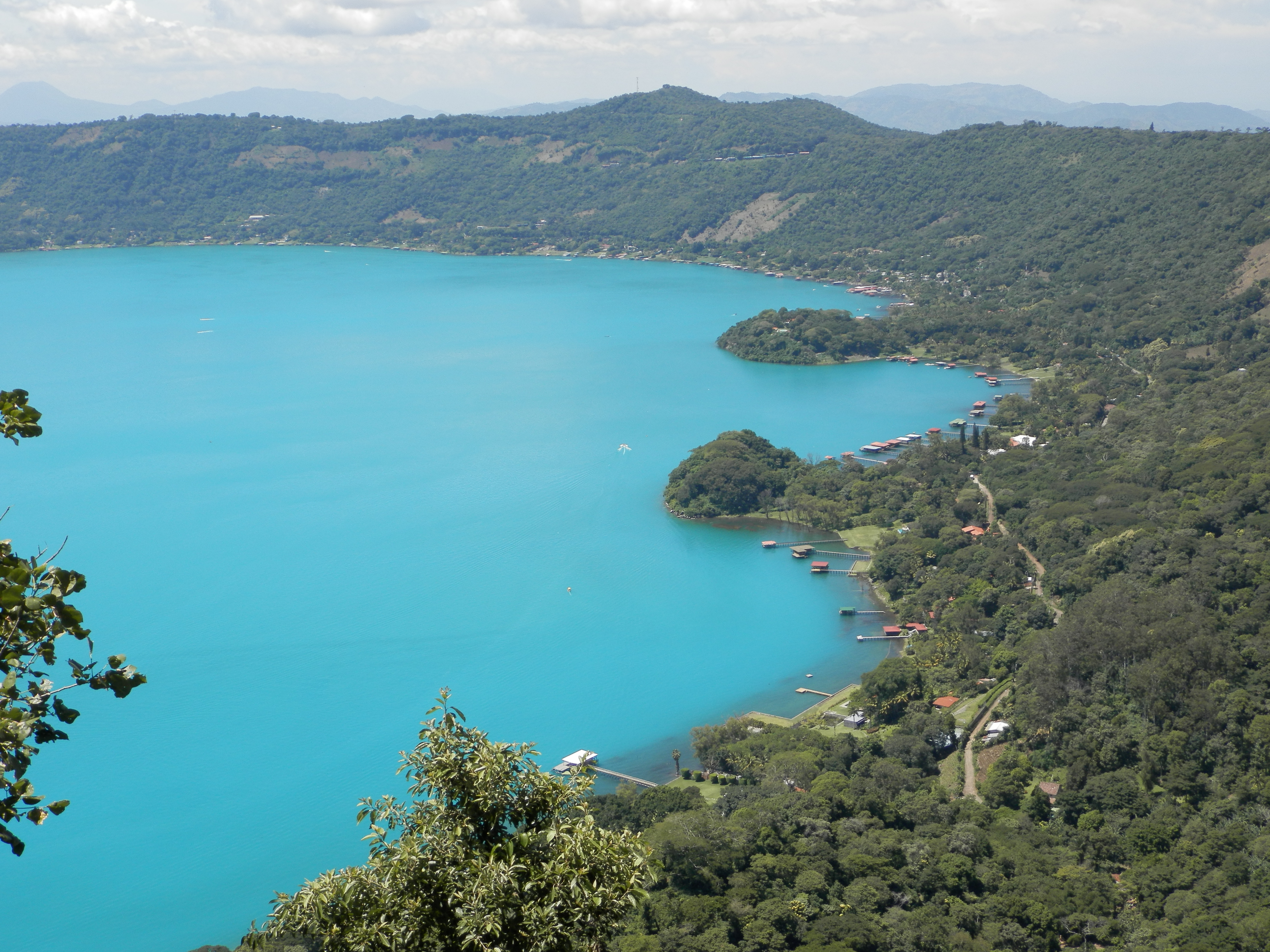
Cyanobacteria activity turns Coatepeque Caldera lake a turquoise color

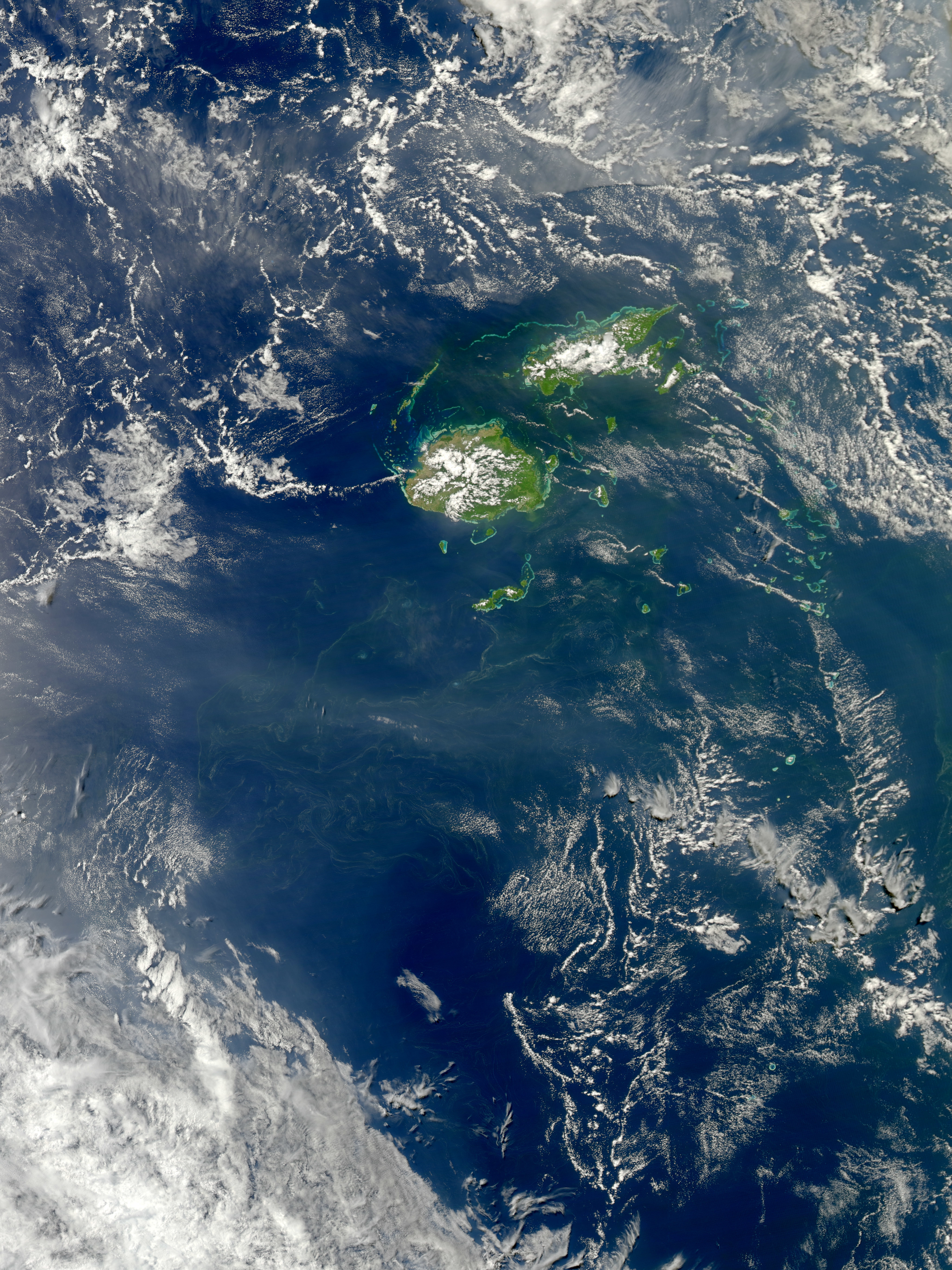
Cyanobacterial bloom near Fiji

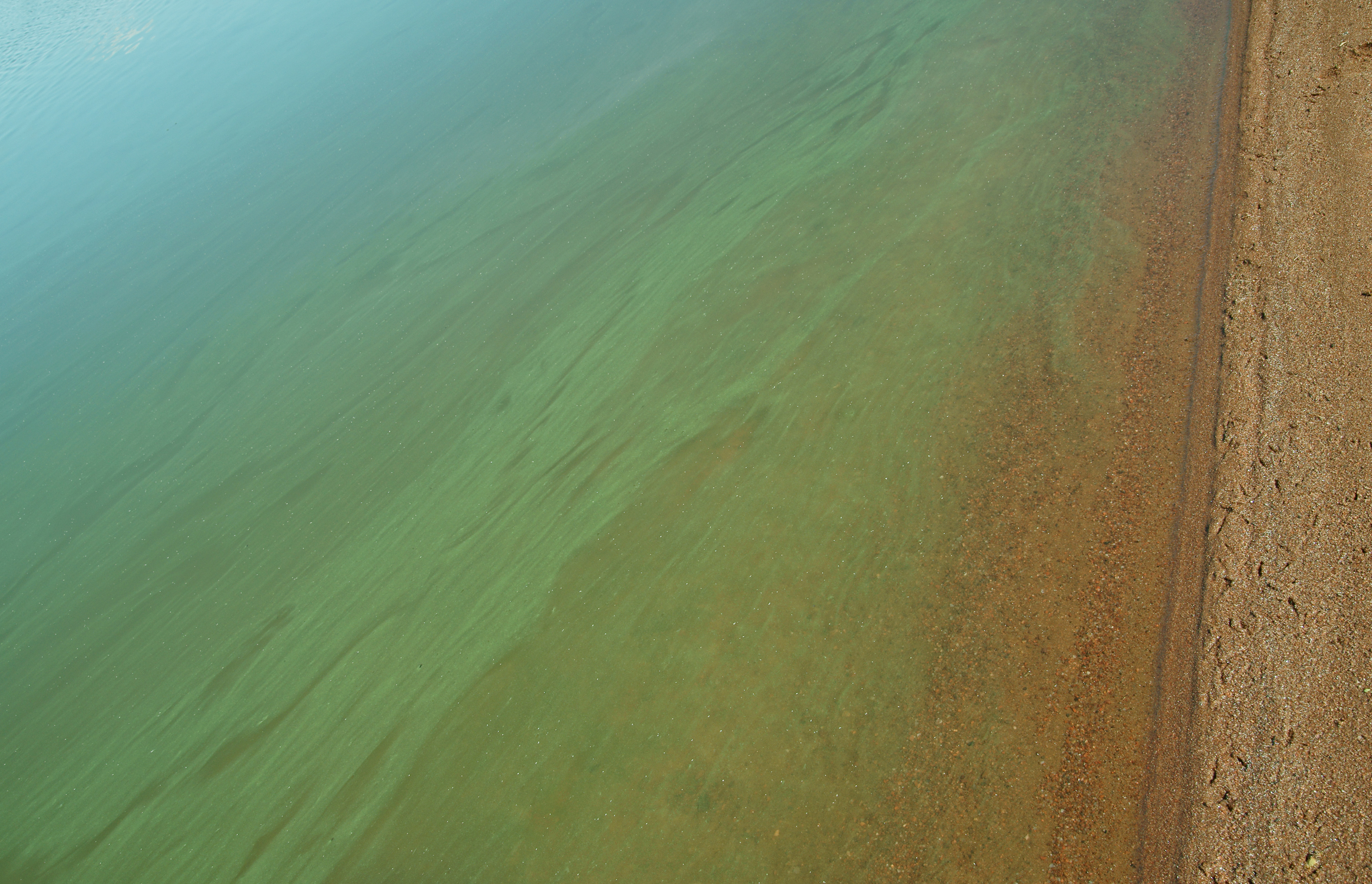
Cyanobacteria in Lake Köyliö.

Video – Oscillatoria and Gleocapsa – with oscillatory movement as filaments of Oscillatoria orient towards light

== See also ==
- Archean Eon
- Bacterial phyla, other major lineages of Bacteria
- Biodiesel
- Cyanobiont
- Endosymbiotic theory
- Geological history of oxygen
- Hypolith
- UTEX 3222
