= Cyanobacterial morphology =

Form and structure of a phylum

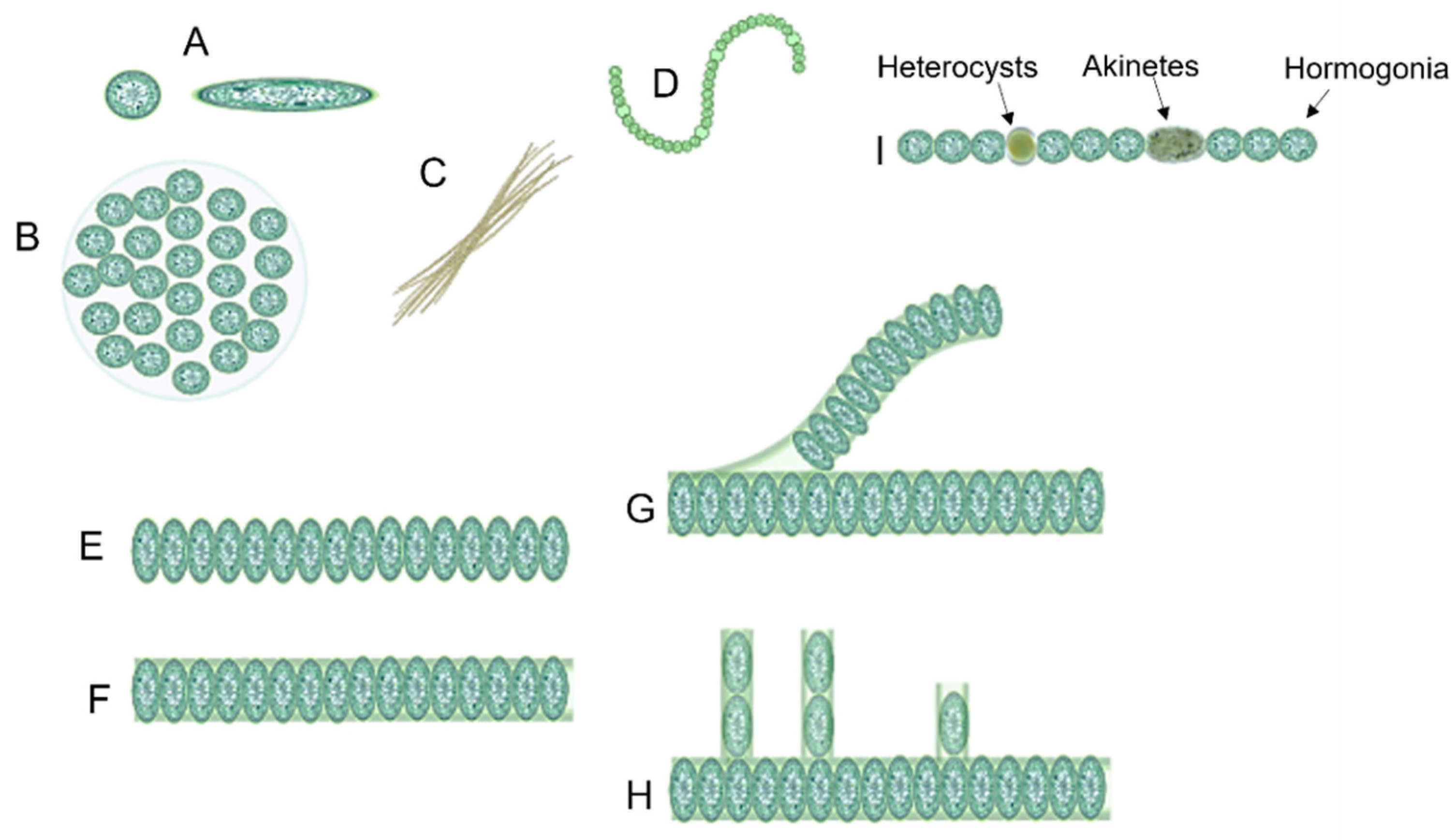
Different forms of cyanobacteria (A) spherical and ovoid unicellular, (B) colonial, (C) filamentous, (D) spiral, (E) unsheathed trichome, (F) sheathed trichome, (G) false branching, (H) true branching, (I) different cell types in filamentous cyanobacteria.

Cyanobacterial morphology refers to the form or shape of cyanobacteria. Cyanobacteria are a large and diverse phylum of bacteria defined by their unique combination of pigments and their ability to perform oxygenic photosynthesis.

Cyanobacteria often live in colonial aggregates that can take a multitude of forms. Of particular interest among the many species of cyanobacteria are those that live colonially in elongate hair-like structures, known as trichomes. These filamentous species can contain hundreds to thousands of cells. They often dominate the upper layers of microbial mats found in extreme environments such as hot springs, hypersaline water, deserts and polar regions, as well as being widely distributed in more mundane environments.

Many filamentous species are also motile, gliding along their long axis, and displaying photomovement by which a trichome modulates its gliding according to the incident light. The latter has been found to play an important role in guiding the trichomes to optimal lighting conditions, which can either inhibit the cells if the incident light is too weak, or damage the cells if too strong.

== Overview ==
Cellular functions require a well-organized and coordinated internal structure to operate effectively. Cells need to build, sustain, and sometimes modify their shape, which allows them to rapidly change their behaviour in response to external factors. During different life cycle stages, such as cell growth, cell division or cell differentiation, internal structures must dynamically adapt to the current requirements. In eukaryotes, these manifold tasks are fulfilled by the cytoskeleton: proteinaceous polymers that assemble into stable or dynamic filaments or tubules in vivo and in vitro. The eukaryotic cytoskeleton is historically divided into three classes: the actin filaments (consisting of actin monomers), the microtubules (consisting of tubulin subunits) and the intermediate filaments (IFs), although other cytoskeletal classes have been identified in recent years. Only the collaborative work of all three cytoskeletal systems enables proper cell mechanics.

The long-lasting dogma that prokaryotes, based on their simple cell shapes, do not require cytoskeletal elements was finally abolished by the discovery of FtsZ, a prokaryotic tubulin homolog, and MreB, a bacterial actin homolog. These discoveries started an intense search for other cytoskeletal proteins in bacteria and archaea which finally led to the identification of bacterial IF-like proteins such as Crescentin from Caulobacter crescentus and even bacterial-specific cytoskeletal protein classes, including bactofilins. Constant influx of new findings finally established that numerous prokaryotic cellular functions, including cell division, cell elongation or bacterial microcompartment segregation are governed by the prokaryotic cytoskeleton.

Cyanobacteria are today's only known prokaryotes capable of performing oxygenic photosynthesis. Based on the presence of an outer membrane, cyanobacteria are generally considered Gram-negative bacteria. However, unlike other Gram-negative bacteria, cyanobacteria contain an unusually thick peptidoglycan (PG) layer between the inner and outer membrane, thus containing features of both Gram phenotypes. Additionally, the degree of PG crosslinking is much higher in cyanobacteria than in other Gram-negative bacteria, although teichoic acids, typically present in Gram-positive bacteria, are absent.

While Cyanobacteria are monophyletic, their cellular morphologies are extremely diverse and range from unicellular species to complex cell-differentiating, multicellular species. Based on this observation, cyanobacteria have been classically divided into five subsections. Subsection I cyanobacteria (Chroococcales) are unicellular and divide by binary fission or budding, whereas subsection II cyanobacteria (Pleurocapsales) are also unicellular but can undergo multiple fission events, giving rise to many small daughter cells termed baeocytes. Subsection III comprises multicellular, non-cell differentiating cyanobacteria (Oscillatoriales) and subsection IV and V cyanobacteria (Nostocales and Stigonematales) are multicellular, cell differentiating cyanobacteria that form specialized cell types in the absence of combined nitrogen (heterocysts), during unfavorable conditions (akinetes) or to spread and initiate symbiosis (hormogonia). Whereas subsections III and IV form linear cell filaments (termed trichomes) that are surrounded by a common sheath, subsection V can produce lateral branches and/or divide in multiple planes, establishing multiseriate trichomes. Considering this complex morphology, it was postulated that certain subsection V-specific (cytoskeletal) proteins could be responsible for this phenotype. However, no specific gene was identified whose distribution was specifically correlated with the cell morphology among different cyanobacterial subsections. Therefore, it seems more likely that differential expression of cell growth and division genes rather than the presence or absence of a single gene is responsible for the cyanobacterial morphological diversity.

== Cell walls ==
To protect bacteria from unpredictable and often hostile environments, their cells are enclosed by a complex multilayered structure. The structure of this layer is not similar for all bacteria and is divided into two major categories known as Gram-positive and Gram-negative. Gram-positive bacteria are surrounded by a thick layer of peptidoglycan and lack an outer membrane. By contrast, Gram-negative bacteria generally have a thin peptidoglycan cell wall, as well as an outer membrane containing lipopolysaccharide.

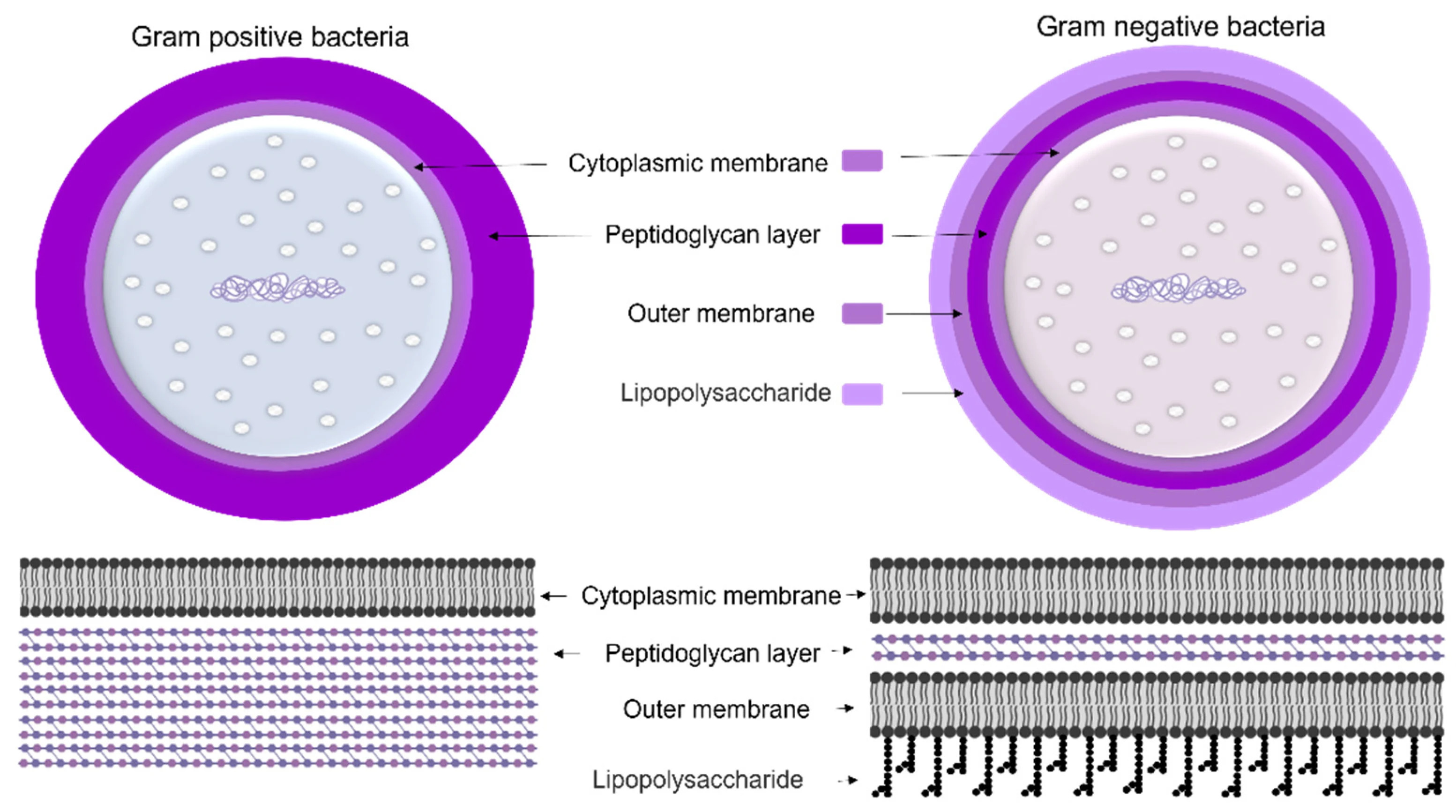
Cell wall composition of Gram-positive and Gram-negative bacteria

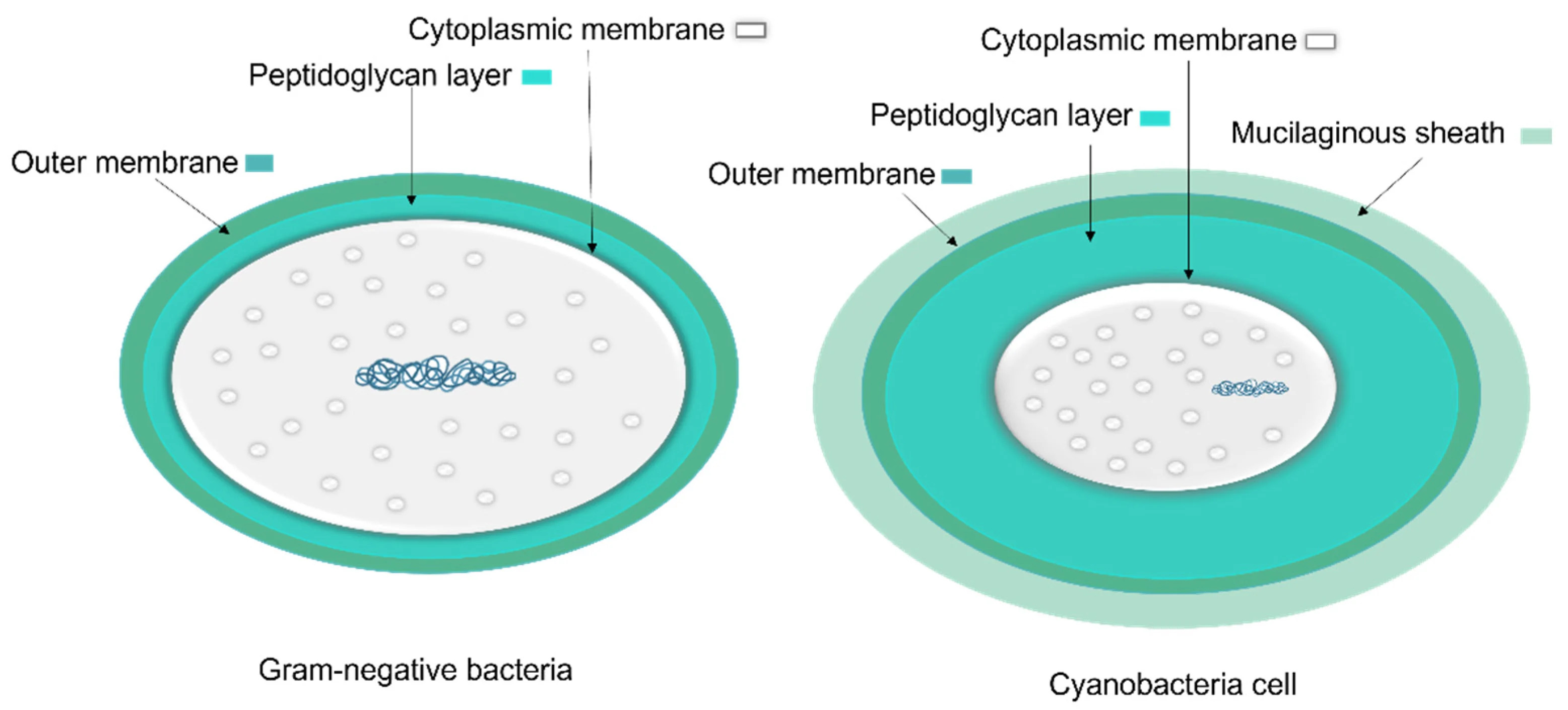
A comparison of general Gram-negative bacteria and cyanobacteria cell envelopes. The peptidoglycan layer in cyanobacteria is thicker than other Gram-negative bacteria and a mucilaginous sheath is present in some taxa.

All described species of cyanobacteria are Gram-negative. Gram-negative means the cell wall composition has specific characteristics involving a layer of peptidoglycan which is generally thin and a lipopolysaccharide outer membrane. However, cyanobacteria's peptidoglycan layer is thicker (10–700 nm) compared to most Gram-negative bacteria (2–6 nm). Unicellular strains such as Synechococcus have relatively thin peptidoglycan layers (about 15 nm), while filamentous strains such as Oscillatoria princeps have relatively thick layers (about 700 nm).

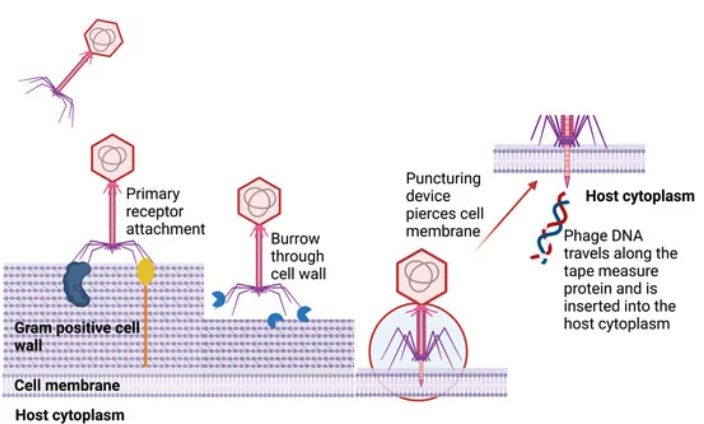
Infection process of tailed bacteriophage on a Gram-positive bacterium

Aside from protection and sensing environmental stress, transport of nutrients and metabolites into and out of the cell is one of the major roles of the cellular membrane. Marine systems teem with viruses (bacteriophages) that target bacteria. The outer membrane in cyanobacteria provides an extra layer of protection against phage attachment and injection. Many marine phages specifically recognize LPS or outer membrane proteins. Gram-positive bacteria lack the additional outer membrane, which means they can be more easily injected by phages, as illustrated in the diagram.

Cyanobacterial grazing by protists (e.g., flagellates, ciliates) can be intense in the photic zone, and the outer membrane may reduce vulnerability to engulfment or enzymatic attack. The outer membrane can also confer resistance to toxins or osmotic fluctuations common in marine gradients (e.g., salinity changes).

Cyanobacteria were the endosymbionts that gave rise to plastids in eukaryotic algae and plants. The double-membrane structure of plastids (inner from cyanobacterial plasma membrane, outer often derived from host or modified bacterial outer membrane) mirrors the diderm Gram-negative envelope. This structural match facilitated successful endosymbiosis, which in turn amplified cyanobacterial-like photosynthesis in marine eukaryotic phytoplankton (like diatoms and coccolithophoress). Gram-positive bacteria would lack this compatible envelope for such integration.

The thinner peptidoglycan and outer membrane makes Gram-negative cells generally smaller and more streamlined than Gram-positive cells. This aids buoyancy regulation and diffusion in water columns. As a result, many cyanobacteria can use gas vesicles as buoyancy control for vertical positioning to optimise light. Some cyanobacteria have thick peptidoglycan (thicker than typical Gram-negatives). This can combine robustness with the protective outer membrane—ideal for withstanding shear forces or ultraviolet light in surface waters.

== Morphogenesis ==
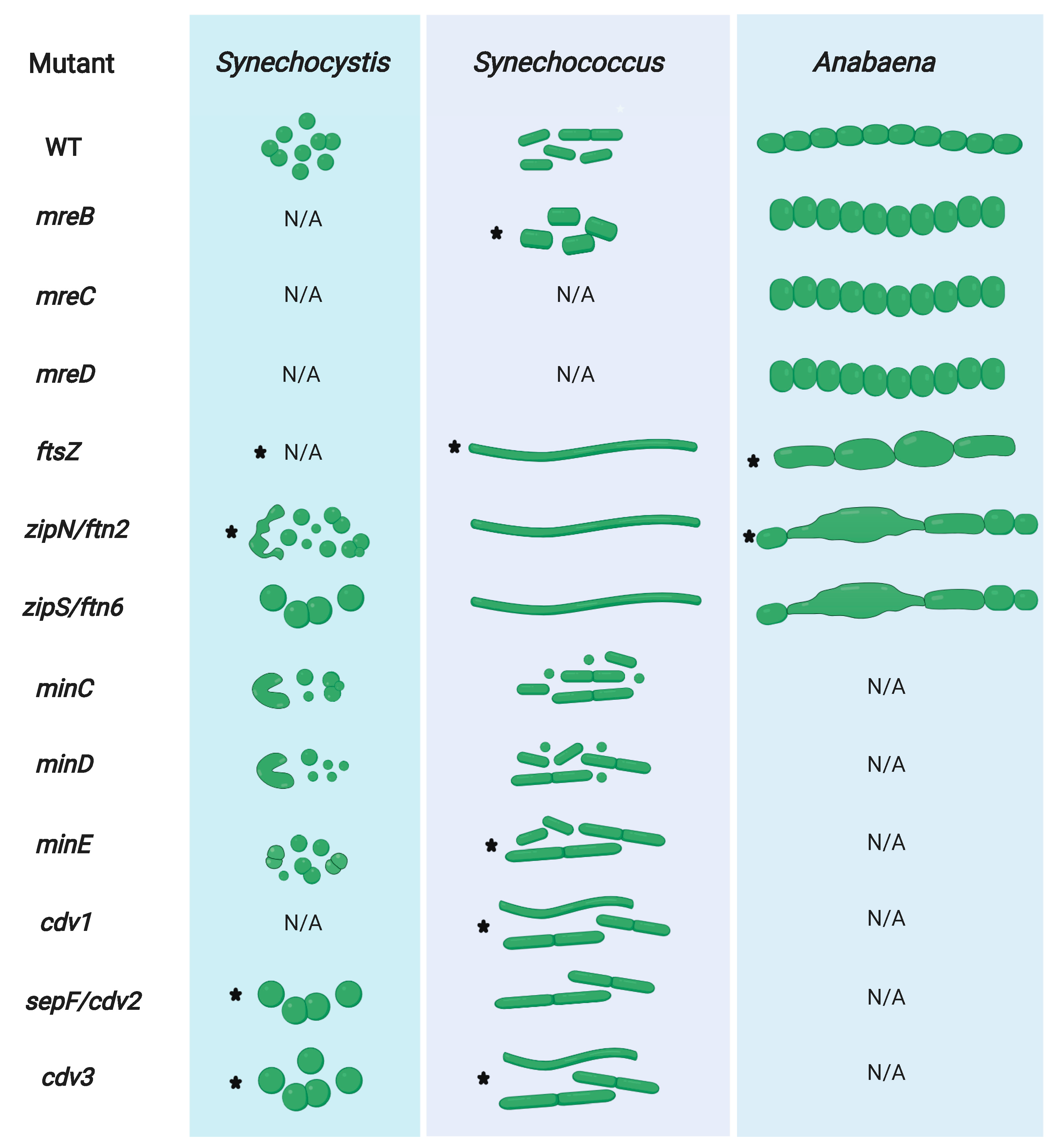
Cyanobacterial cell division and cell growth mutant phenotypes in Synechocystis, Synechococcus, and Anabaena. Stars indicate gene essentiality in the respective organism. While one gene can be essential in one cyanobacterial organism/morphotype, it does not necessarily mean it is essential in all other cyanobacteria. N/A indicates that no mutant phenotypes have been described. WT: wild type.

Morphogenesis is the biological process that causes an organism to develop its shape. Cyanobacteria show a high degree of morphological diversity and can undergo a variety of cellular differentiation processes in order to adapt to certain environmental conditions. This helps them thrive in almost every habitat on Earth, ranging from freshwater to marine and terrestrial habitats, including even symbiotic interactions.

One factor which can drive morphological changes in cyanobacteria is light. As cyanobacteria are bacteria that use light to fuel their energy-producing photosynthetic machinery they depend on perceiving light in order to optimize their response and to avoid harmful light that could result in the formation of reactive oxygen species and subsequently in their death. Optimal light conditions may be defined by quantity (irradiance), duration (day–night cycle) and wavelength (color of light). The photosynthetically usable light range of the solar spectrum is generally referred to as PAR (photosynthetically active radiation), but some cyanobacteria may expand on PAR by not only absorbing in the visible spectrum, but also the near-infrared light spectrum. This employs a variety of chlorophylls and allows phototrophic growth up to a wavelength of 750 nm. To sense the light across this range of wavelengths, cyanobacteria possess various photoreceptors of the phytochrome superfamily.

Morphological plasticity, or the ability of one cell to alternate between different shapes, is a common strategy of many bacteria in response to environmental changes or as part of their normal life cycle. Bacteria may alter their shape by simpler transitions from rod to coccoid (and vice versa) as in Escherichia coli, by more complex transitions while establishing multicellularity or by the development of specialized cells, structures or appendages where the population presents a pleomorphic lifestyle. The precise molecular circuits that govern those morphological changes are yet to be identified, however, a so-far constant factor is that the cell shape is determined by the rigid PG sacculus which consists of glycan strands crosslinked by peptides. To grow, cells must synthesize new PG while breaking down the existent polymer to insert the newly synthesized material. How cells grow and elongate has been extensively reviewed in model organisms of both, rod-shaped and coccoid bacteria. The molecular basis for morphological plasticity and pleomorphism in more complex bacteria, however, is slowly being elucidated as well.

Despite their morphological complexity, cyanobacteria contain all conserved and so far known bacterial morphogens. Understanding cyanobacterial morphogenesis is challenging, as there are numerous morphotypes among cyanobacterial taxa, which can also vary within a given strain during its life cycle. Changes in cellular or even trichome morphologies are tasks that would require active cell wall remodelling and thus far no genes attributed to the different morphotypes have been identified in cyanobacteria. Therefore, the most likely scenario is that genes or their products are differentially regulated during these cell morphology transitions, as it has been hypothesized for most bacteria. In multicellular cyanobacteria, division of labor between cells within a trichome is achieved by different cell programing strategies. Thus, gene regulation occurs differentially in these specific cell types [30,97,98].

== Diversity of forms ==
Cyanobacteria present remarkable variability in terms of morphology: from unicellular and colonial to multicellular filamentous forms. Their cell size varies from less than 1 μm in diameter (picocyanobacteria) up to 100 μm (some tropical forms in the genus Oscillatoria)

Filamentous forms exhibit functional cell differentiation such as heterocysts (for nitrogen fixation), akinetes (resting stage cells), and hormogonia (reproductive, motile filaments). These, together with the intercellular connections they possess, are considered the first signs of multicellularity.

Many cyanobacteria form motile filaments of cells, called hormogonia, that travel away from the main biomass to bud and form new colonies elsewhere. The cells in a hormogonium are often thinner than in the vegetative state, and the cells on either end of the motile chain may be tapered. To break away from the parent colony, a hormogonium often must tear apart a weaker cell in a filament, called a necridium.

Diversity in cyanobacteria morphology

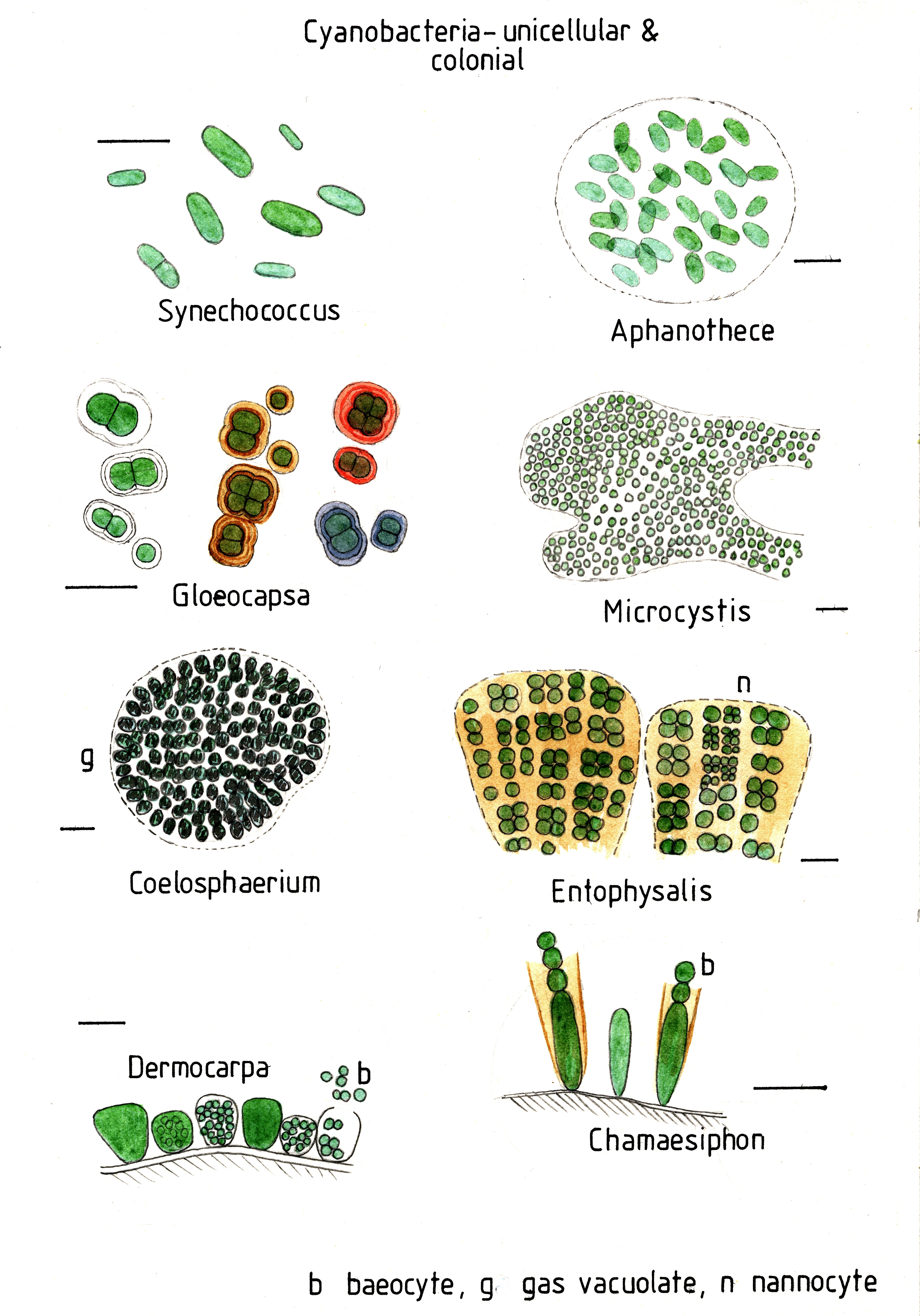
Unicellular and colonial cyanobacteria
scale bars about 10 μm

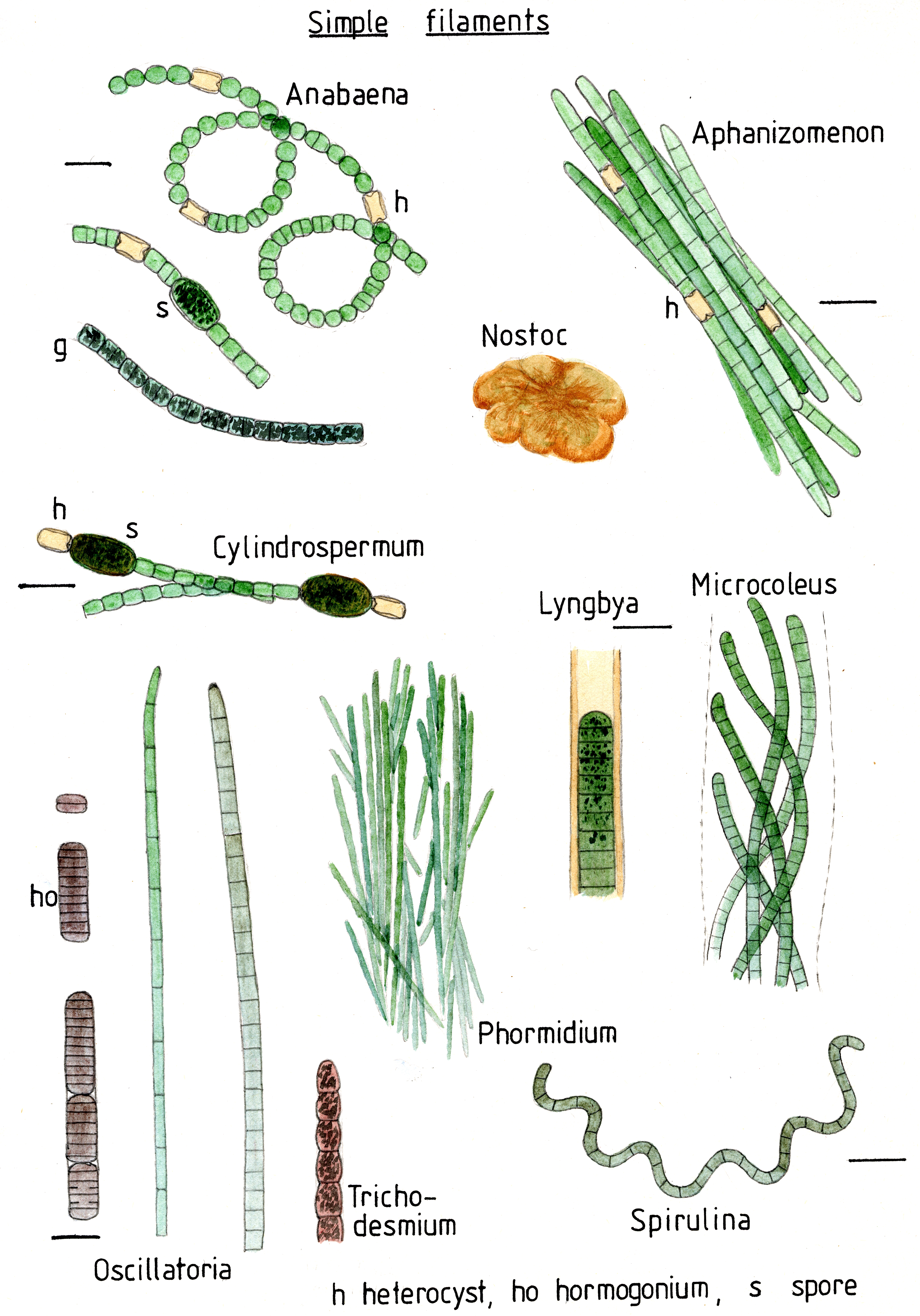
Simple cyanobacterial filaments Nostocales, Oscillatoriales and Spirulinales

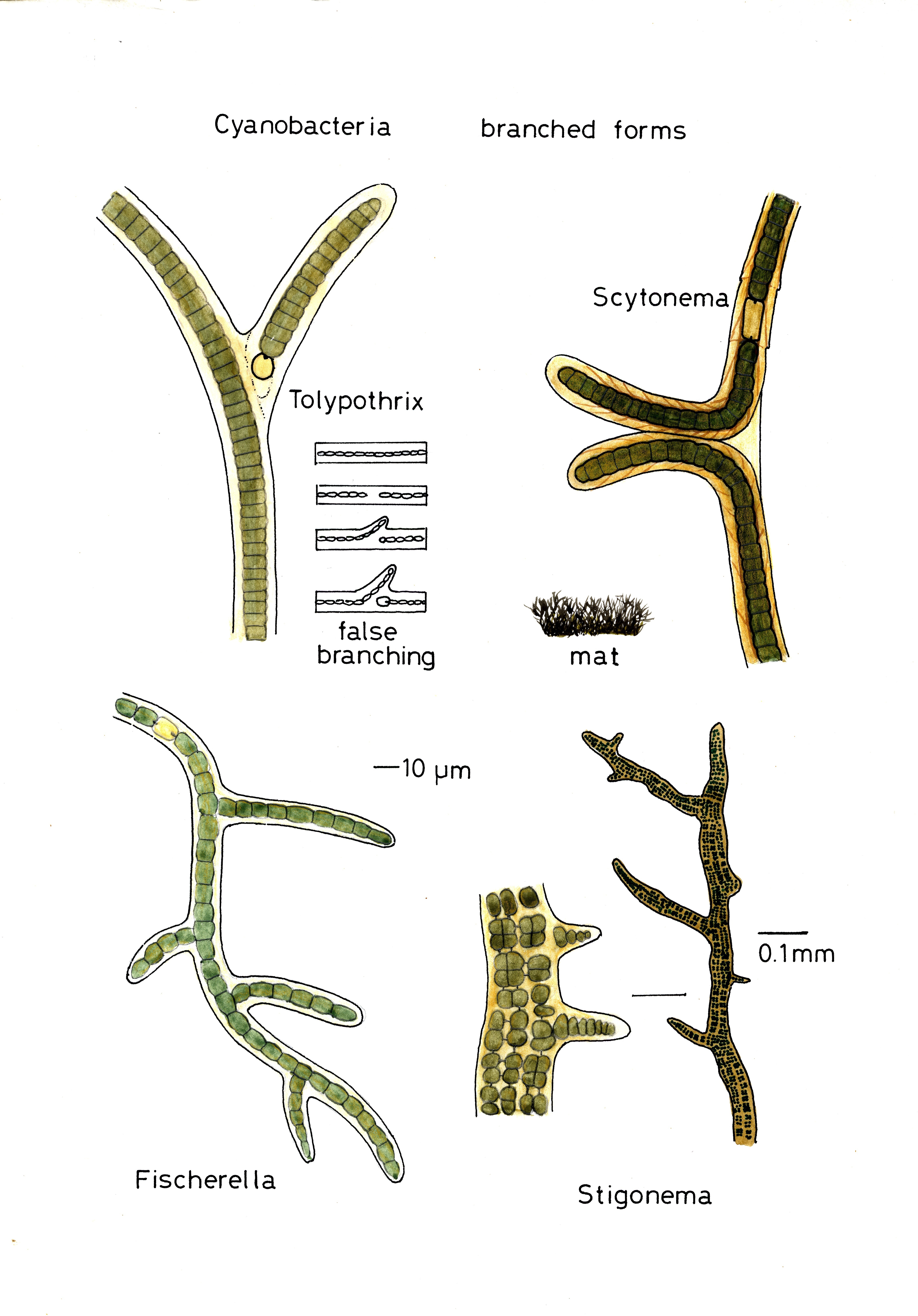
Branched forms
Tolypothrix, Scytonema, Stigonema and Fischerella

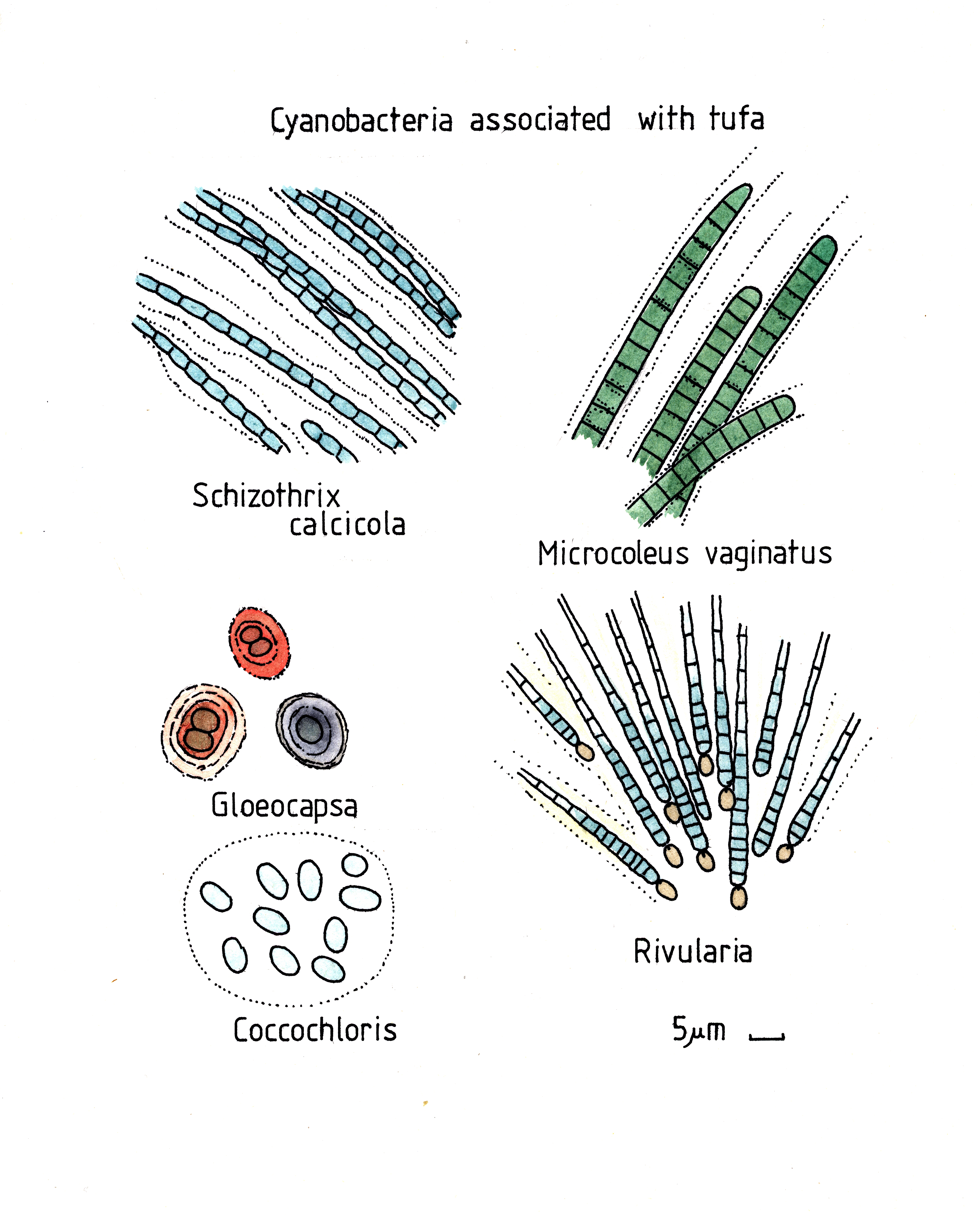
Cyanobacteria associated with tufa
Schizothrix calcicola, Gloeocapsa, Coccochloris, Microcoleus vaginatus and Rivularia

Drawings by Allan Pentecost

=== Colonial and unicellular ===
In aquatic habitats, unicellular cyanobacteria are considered as an important group regarding abundance, diversity, and ecological character. Unicellular cyanobacteria have spherical, ovoid, or cylindrical cells that may aggregate into irregular or regular colonies bound together by the mucous matrix (mucilage) secreted during the growth of the colony. Based on the species, the number of cells in each colony may vary from two to several thousand.

Each individual cell (each single cyanobacterium) typically has a thick, gelatinous cell wall. They lack flagella, but hormogonia of some species can move about by gliding along surfaces.

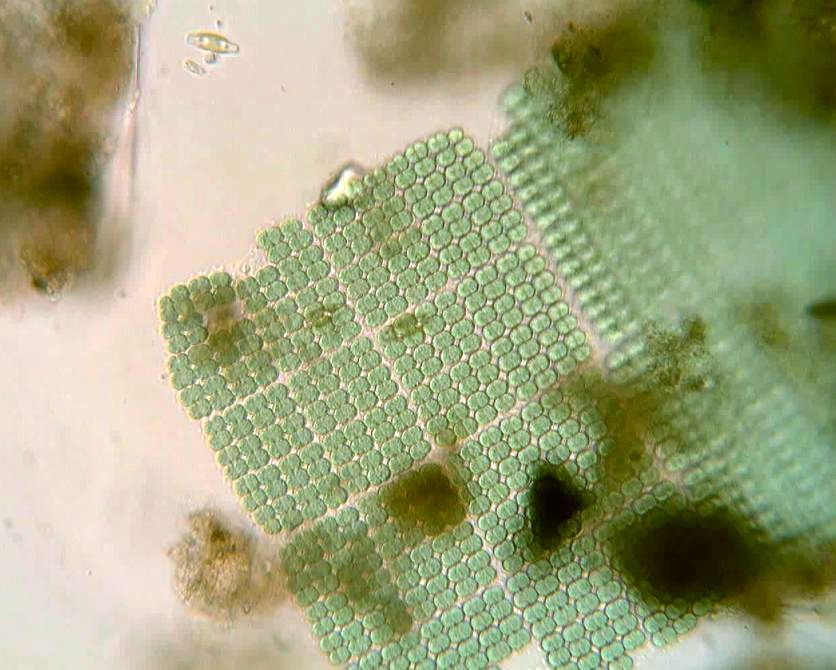
Merismopedia forms rectangular colonies held together by a mucilaginous matrix. Species in this genus divide in only two directions, creating a characteristic grid-like pattern arranged in rows and flats.
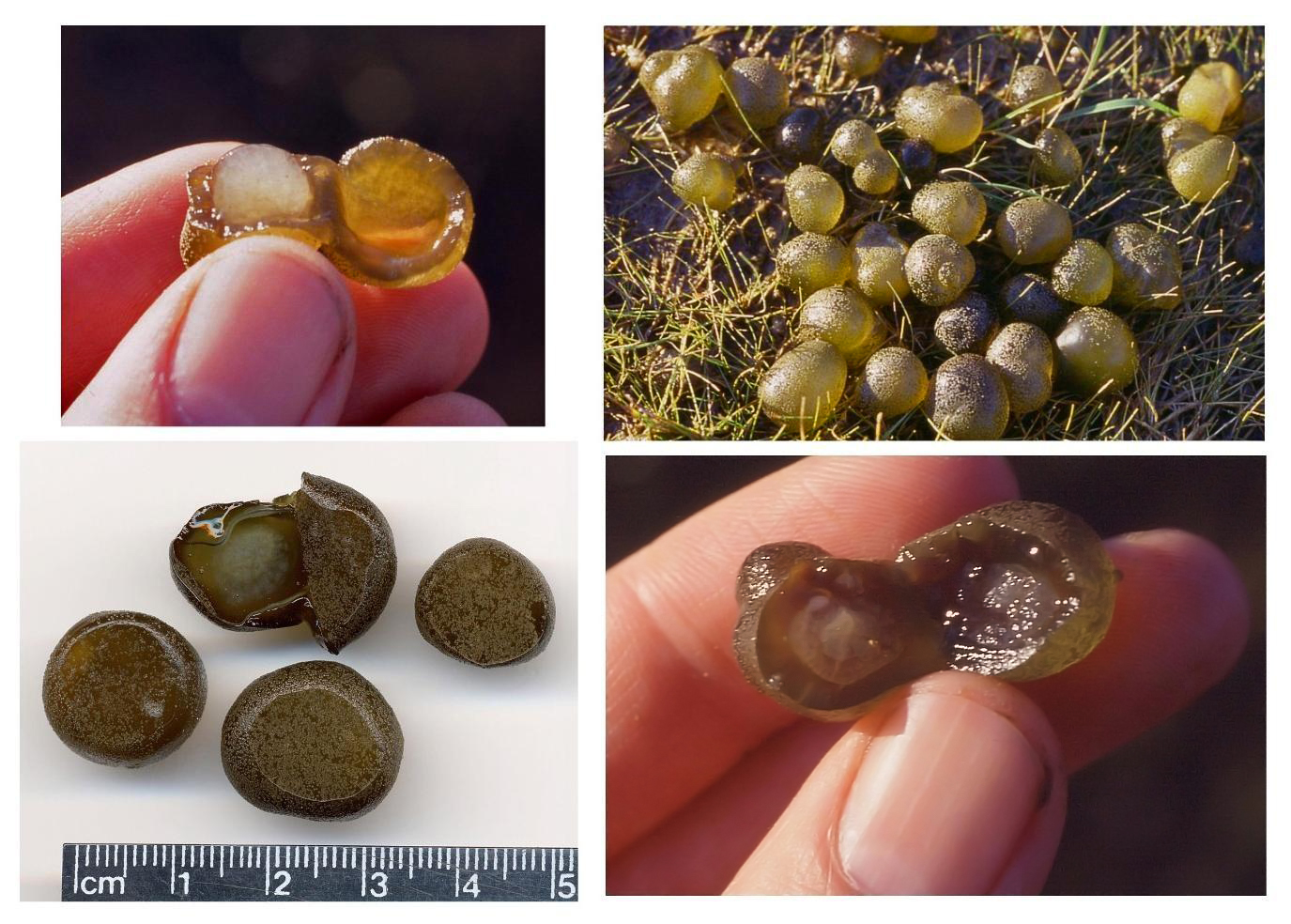
Colonies of Nostoc pruniforme "jelly balls"
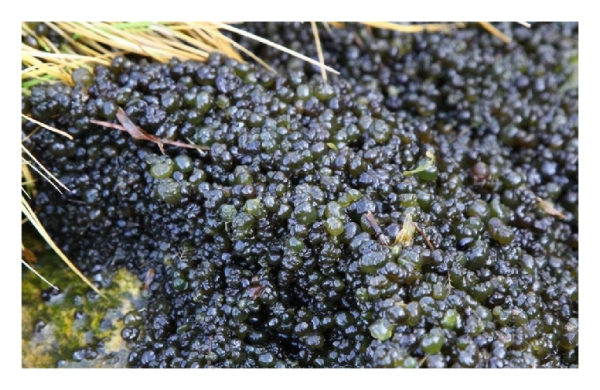
Colonial cyanobacteria Stratonostoc

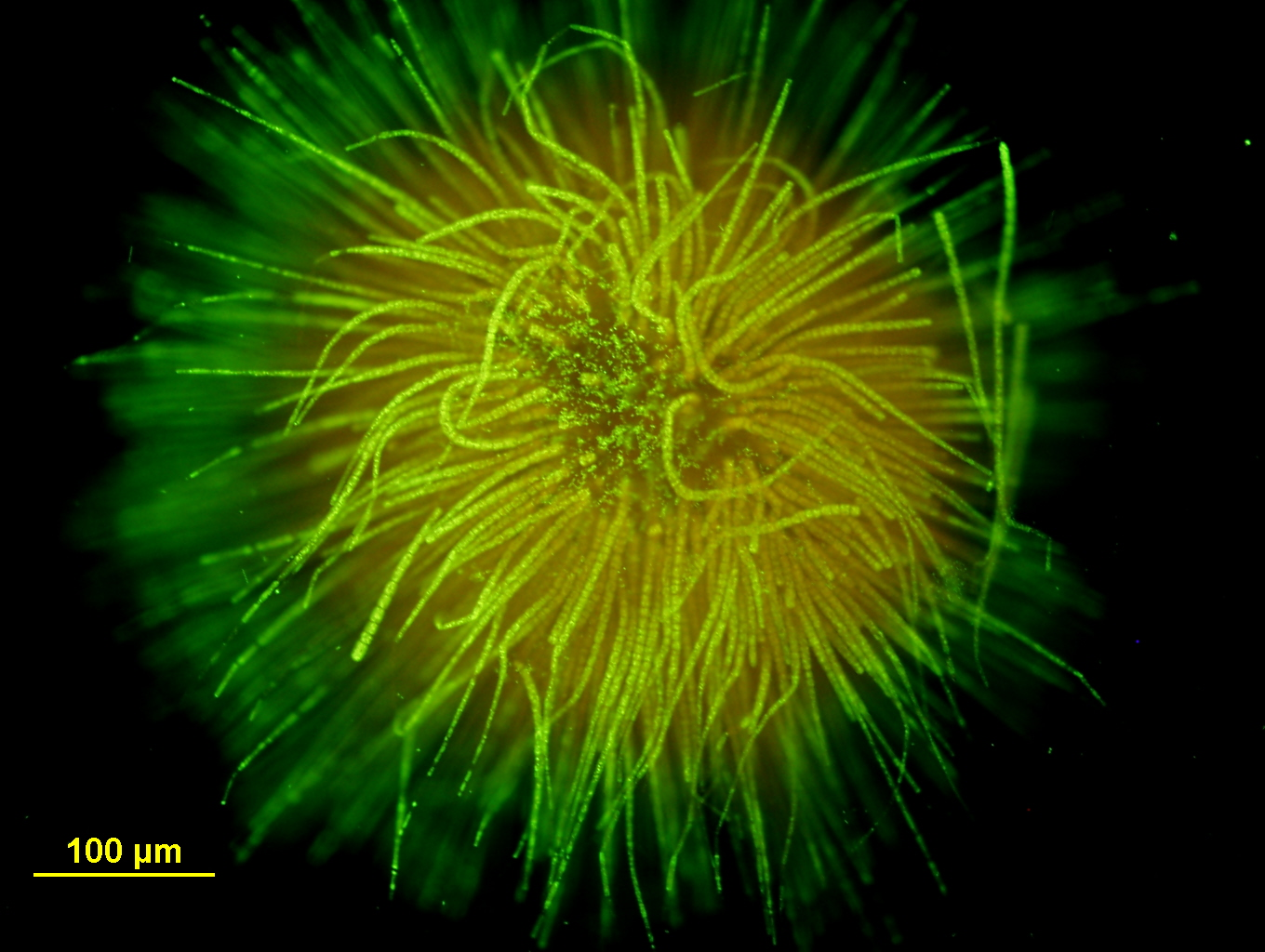
Ball-shaped colony of Gloeotrichia echinulata

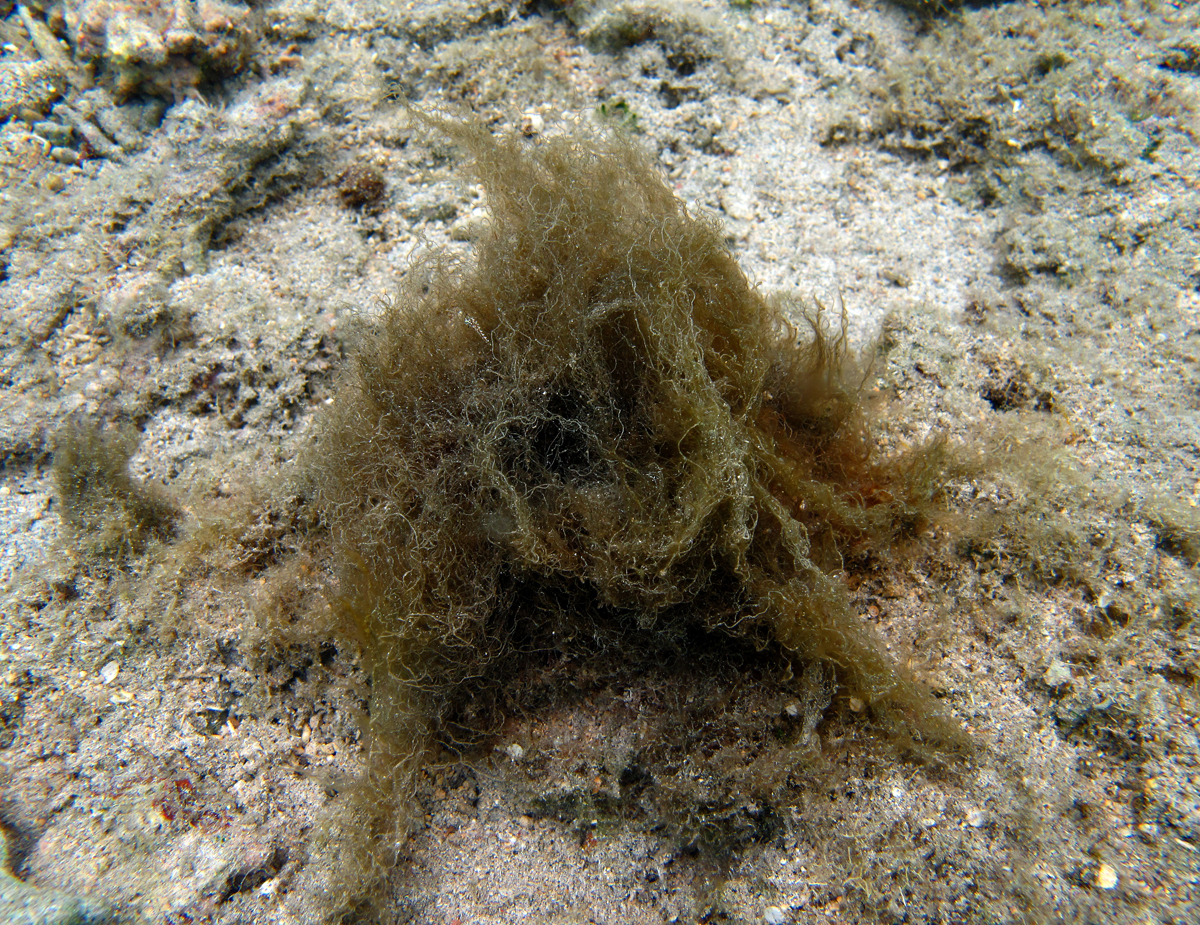
Cyanobacterial colony of Lyngbya majuscula

=== Filamentous and multicellular ===
Some filamentous species can differentiate into several different cell types:

- vegetative cells – the normal, photosynthetic cells that are formed under favorable growing conditions
- akinetes – climate-resistant spores that may form when environmental conditions become harsh
- thick-walled heterocysts – which contain the enzyme nitrogenase vital for nitrogen fixation in an anaerobic environment due to its sensitivity to oxygen.

Many of the multicellular filamentous forms of Oscillatoria are capable of a waving motion; the filament oscillates back and forth. In water columns, some cyanobacteria float by forming gas vesicles, as in archaea. These vesicles are not organelles as such. They are not bounded by lipid membranes but by a protein sheath.

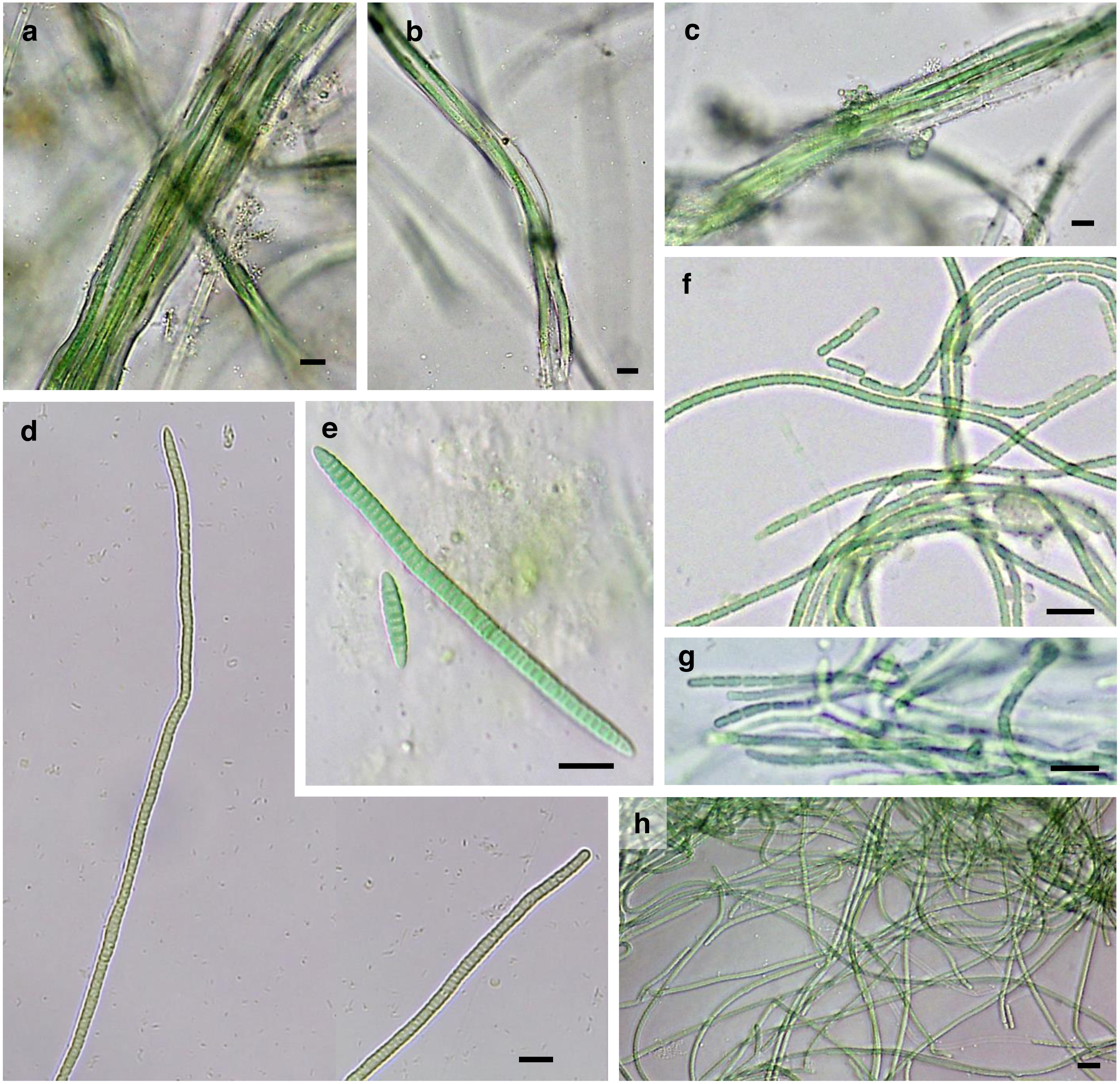
Microphotographs of bundle-forming filamentous cyanobacteria A–C: Microcoleus steenstrupii D–E: Tolypothrix desertorum F: Scytonema cf. calcicola G: S. cf. calcicola H: S. cf. c alcicola Scale bar =10 μm

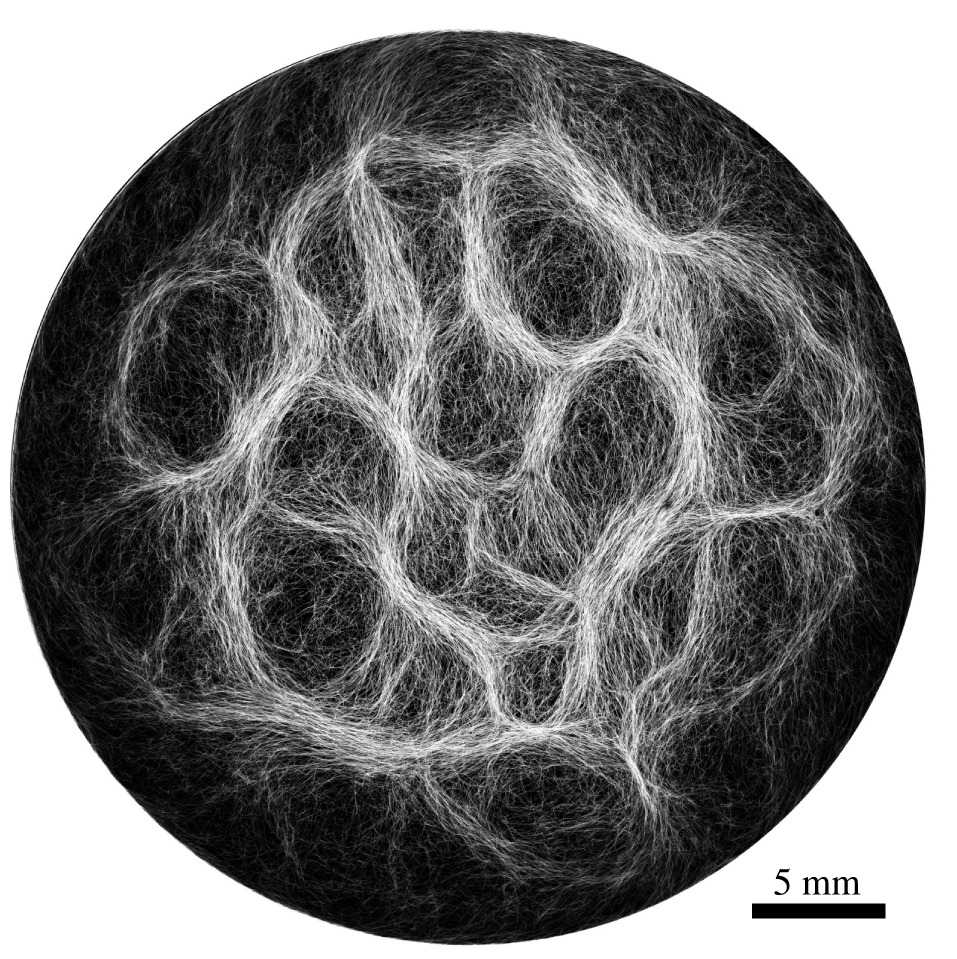
Example of filamentous cyanobacteria structure (Oscillatoria lutea) showing a reticulate pattern
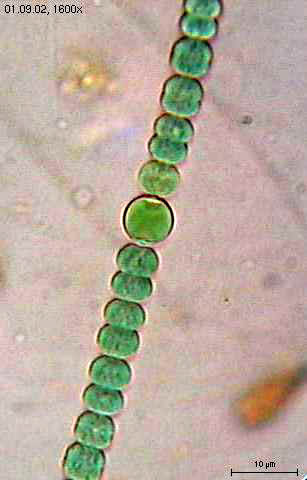
Anabaena sperica

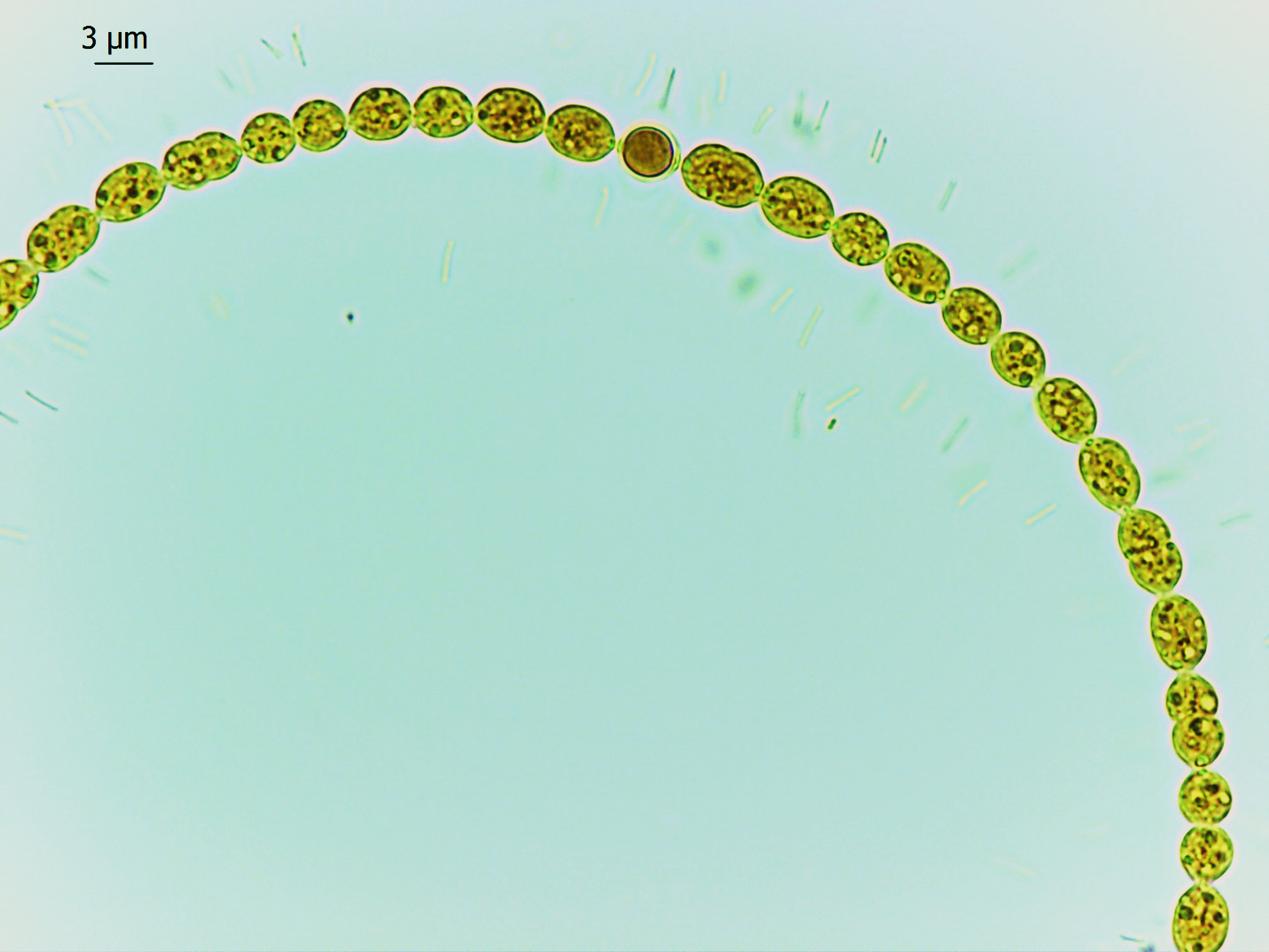
Anabaena is used as a model organism to study simple vision

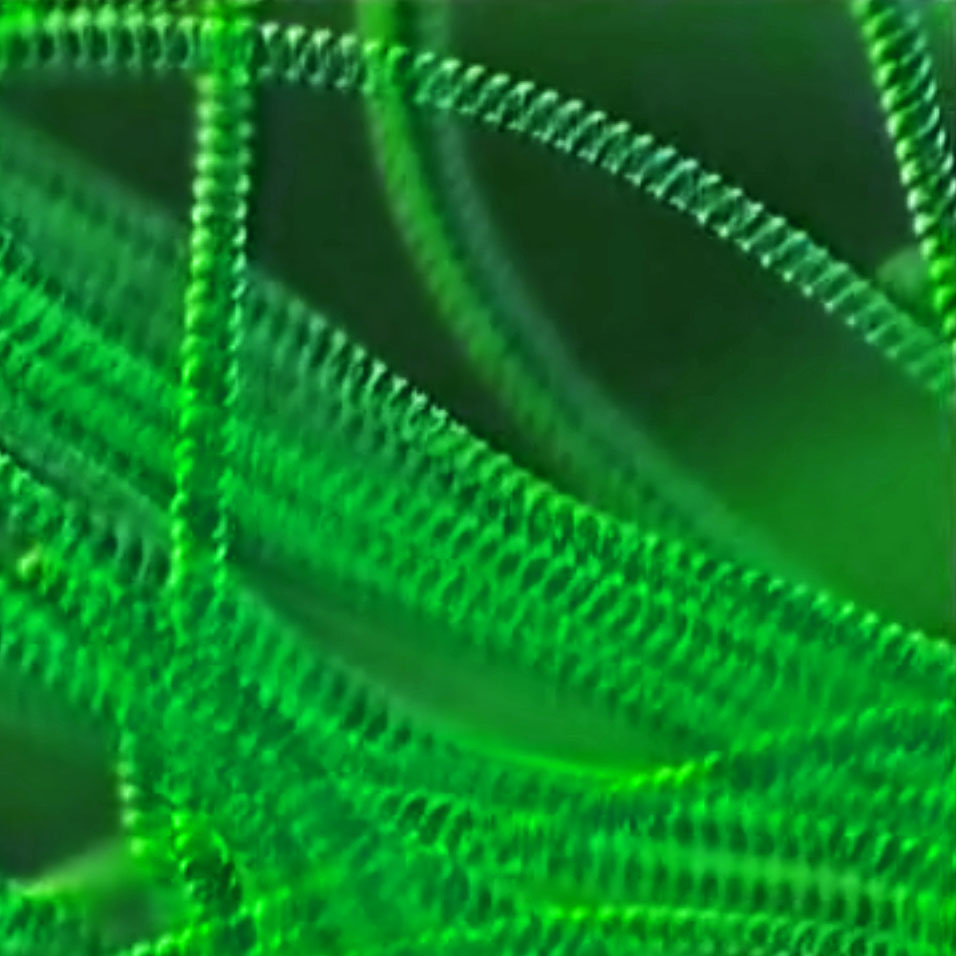
Helical filaments of cyanobacteria

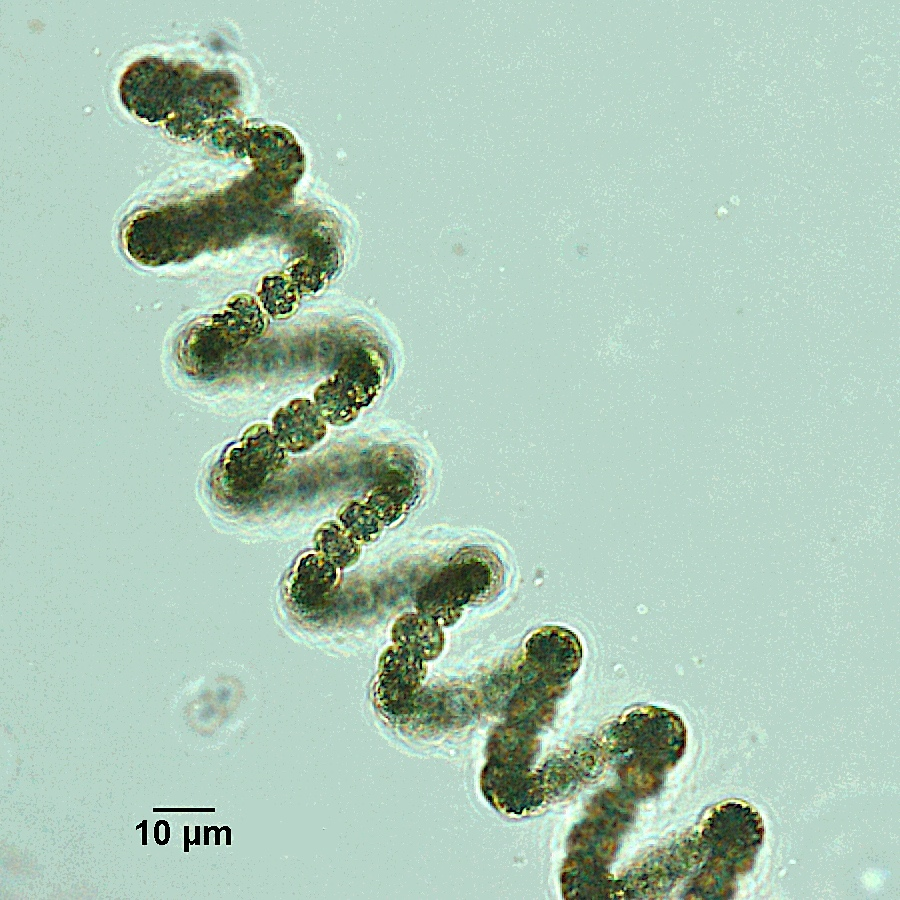
Helical filament from Dolichospermum

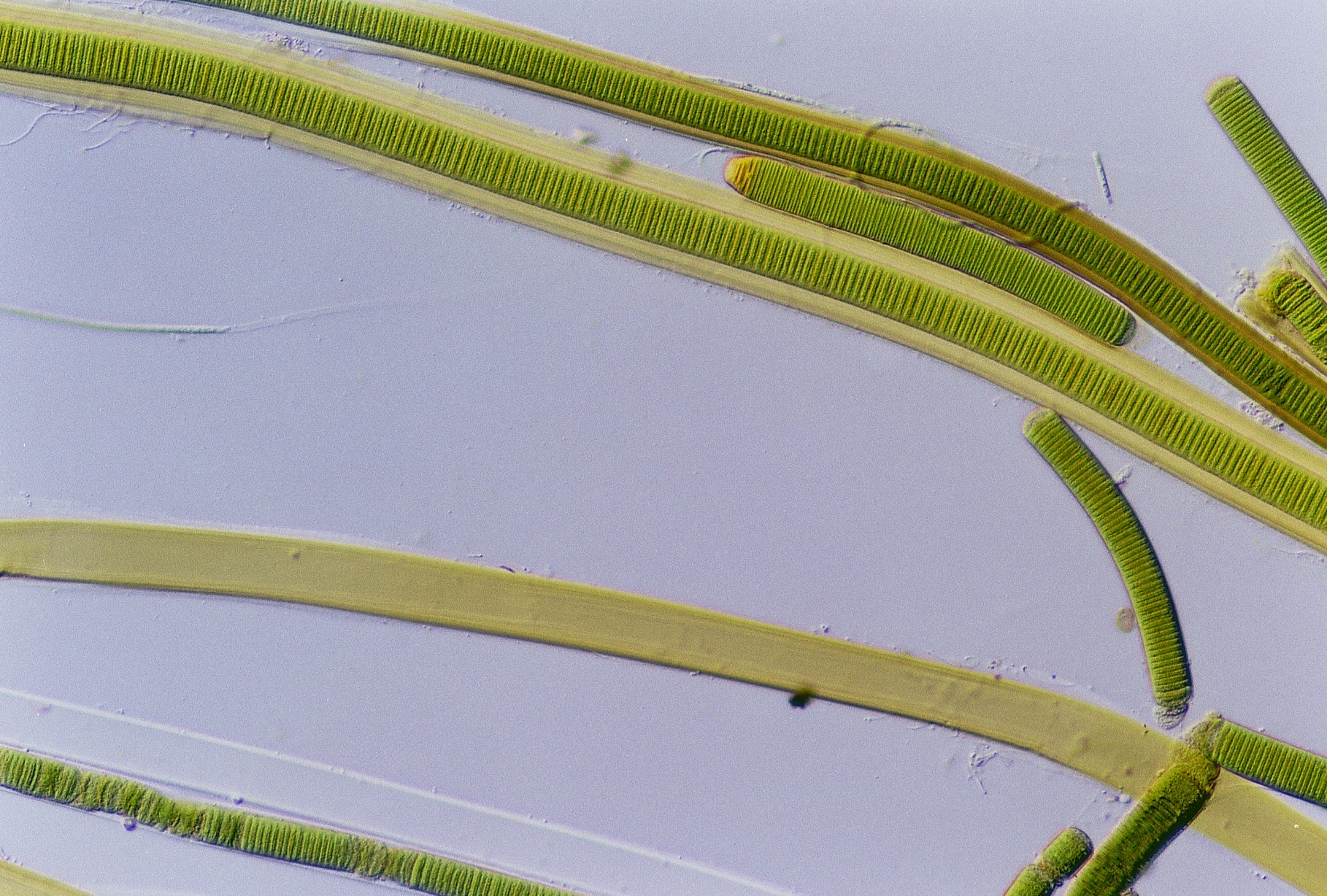
Lyngbya species form long, unbranching filaments inside rigid mucilaginous sheaths which can form tangles or mats, intermixed with other phytoplankton species

=== Branched ===
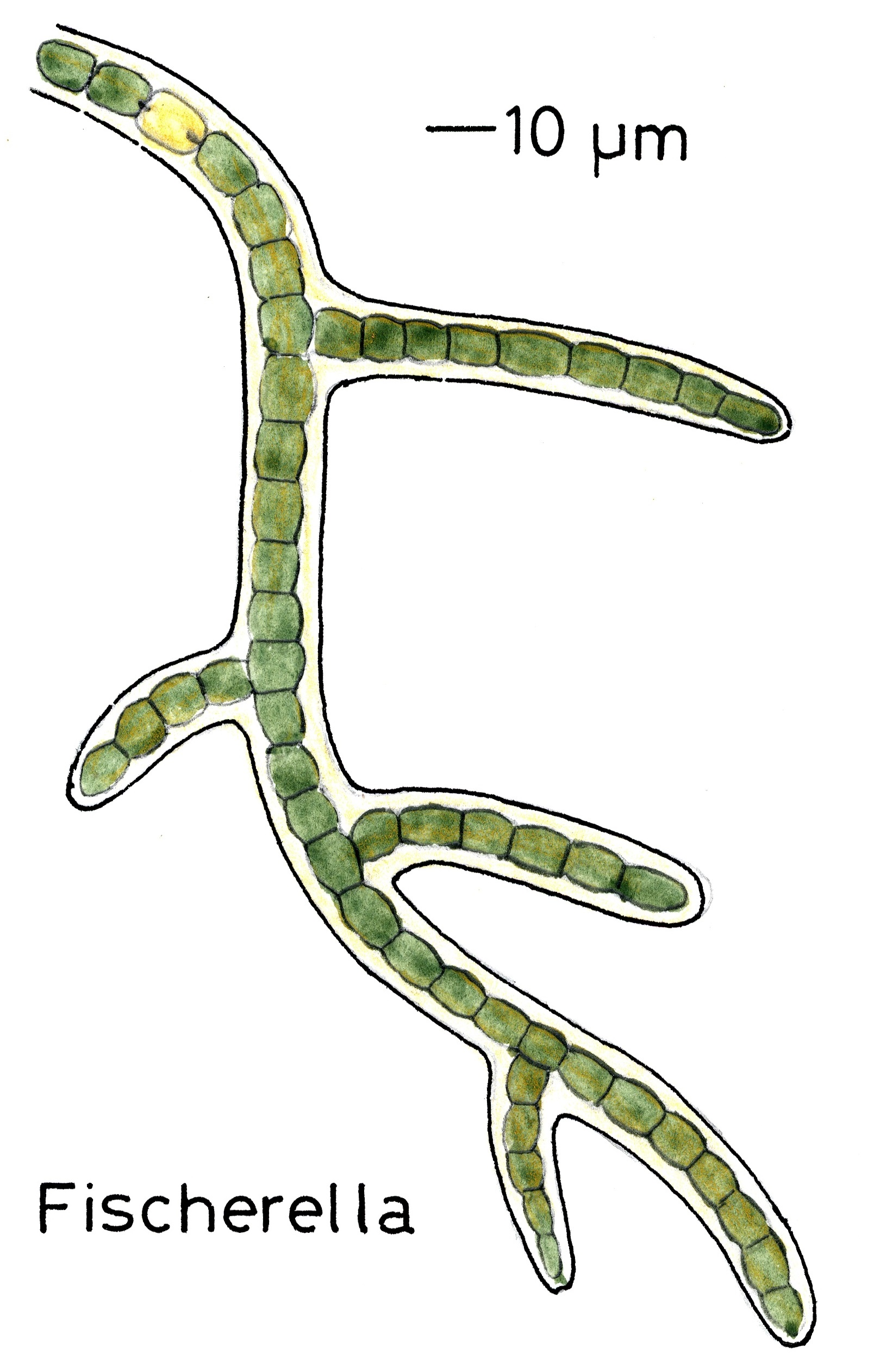
Fischerella

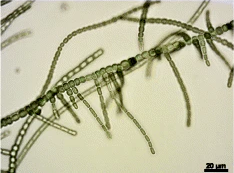
True branching phenotype of a Fischerella thermalis colony

== Heterocysts ==
Heterocysts are specialized nitrogen-fixing cells formed during nitrogen starvation by some filamentous cyanobacteria, such as Nostoc punctiforme, Cylindrospermum stagnale, and Anabaena sphaerica. They fix nitrogen from atmospheric N_{2} using the enzyme nitrogenase, in order to provide the cells in the filament with nitrogen for biosynthesis.

== Movement ==
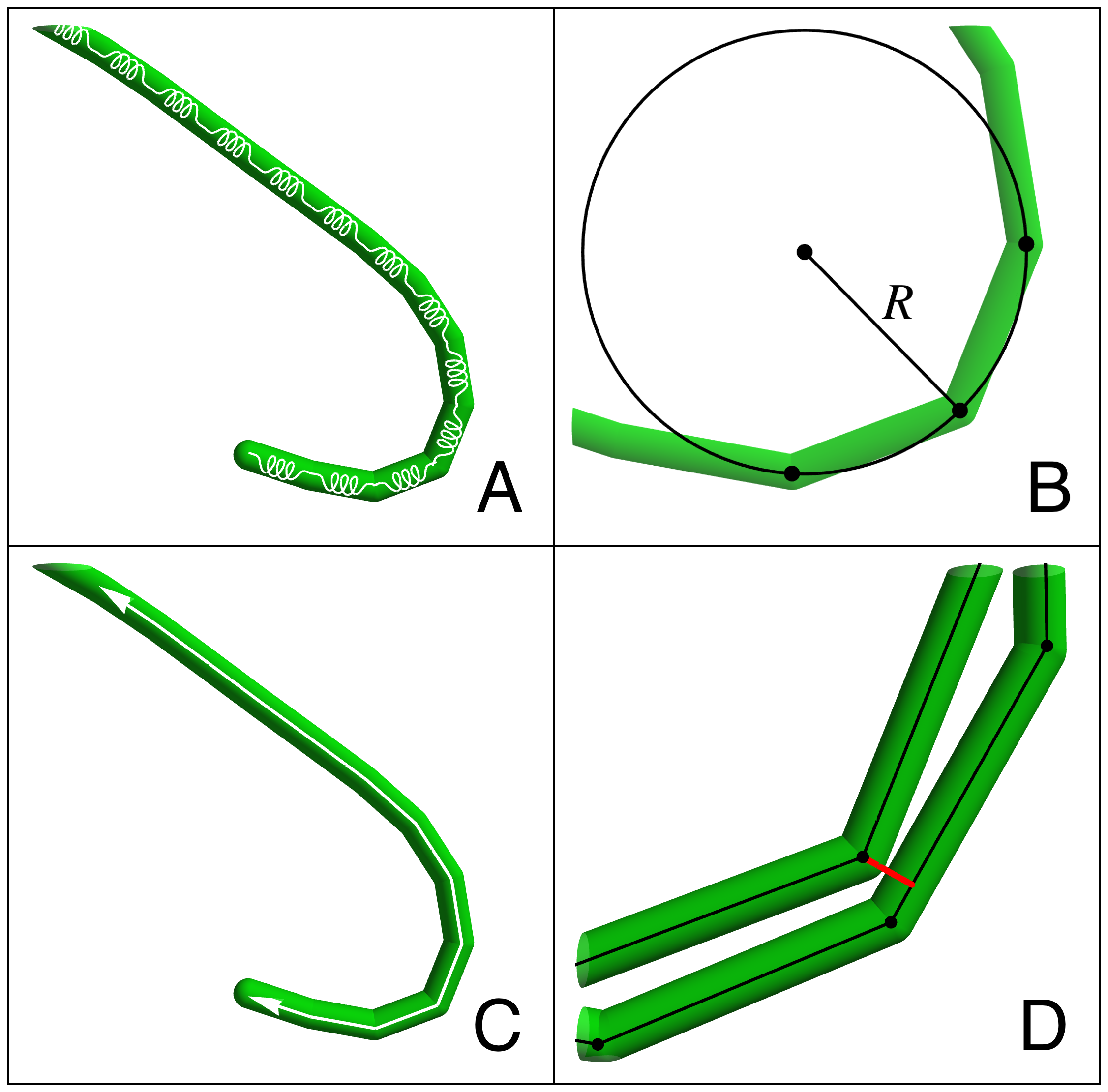
Modeling filamentous cyanobacteria Model components: (A) Trichomes are modeled as thin flexible rods that are discretized into sequences of 50 μm edges. Each edge is loaded with a linear spring. (B) The local bending moment is a function of the radius of curvature. (C) Trichomes can glide along their long axis and reverse their direction of movement photophobically. (D) Trichome collisions are defined between edge-vertex pairs. A vertex that penetrates an edge's volume is repulsed by equal and opposite forces between the pair.

Cyanobacteria are ubiquitous, finding habitats in most water bodies and in extreme environments such as the polar regions, deserts, brine lakes and hot springs. They have also evolved surprisingly complex collective behaviours that lie at the boundary between single-celled and multicellular life. For example, filamentous cyanobacteria live in long chains of cells that bundle together into larger structures including biofilms, biomats and stromatolites. These large colonies provide a rigid, stable and long-term environment for their communities of bacteria. In addition, cyanobacteria-based biofilms can be used as bioreactors to produce a wide range of chemicals, including biofuels like biodiesel and ethanol. However, despite their importance to the history of life on Earth, and their commercial and environmental potentials, there remain basic questions of how filamentous cyanobacteria move, respond to their environment and self-organize into collective patterns and structures.

All known cyanobacteria lack flagella; however, many filamentous species move on surfaces by gliding, a form of locomotion where no physical appendages are seen to aid movement. The actual mechanism behind gliding is not fully understood, although over a century has elapsed since its discovery. One theory suggests that gliding motion in cyanobacteria is mediated by the continuous secretion of polysaccharides through pores on individual cells. Another theory suggests that gliding motion involves the use of type IV pili, polymeric assemblies of the protein pilin, as the driving engines of motion. However, it is not clear how the action of these pili would lead to motion, with some suggesting they retract, while others suggest they push, to generate forces. Other scholars have suggested surface waves generated by the contraction of a fibril layer as the mechanism behind gliding motion in Oscillatoria. Recent work also suggests that shape fluctuations and capillary forces could be involved in gliding motion.

Through collective interaction, filamentous cyanobacteria self-organize into colonies or biofilms, symbiotic communities found in a wide variety of ecological niches. Their larger-scale collective structures are characterized by diverse shapes including bundles, vortices and reticulate patterns. Similar patterns have been observed in fossil records. For filamentous cyanobacteria, the mechanics of the filaments is known to contribute to self-organization, for example in determining how one filament will bend when in contact with other filaments or obstacles. Further, biofilms and biomats show some remarkably conserved macro-mechanical properties, typically behaving as viscoelastic materials with a relaxation time of about 20 min.

Cyanobacteria have strict light requirements. Too little light can result in insufficient energy production, and in some species may cause the cells to resort to heterotrophic respiration. Too much light can inhibit the cells, decrease photosynthesis efficiency and cause damage by bleaching. UV radiation is especially deadly for cyanobacteria, with normal solar levels being significantly detrimental for these microorganisms in some cases.

Filamentous cyanobacteria that live in microbial mats often migrate vertically and horizontally within the mat in order to find an optimal niche that balances their light requirements for photosynthesis against their sensitivity to photodamage. For example, the filamentous cyanobacteria Oscillatoria sp. and Spirulina subsalsa found in the hypersaline benthic mats of Guerrero Negro, Mexico migrate downwards into the lower layers during the day in order to escape the intense sunlight and then rise to the surface at dusk. In contrast, the population of Microcoleus chthonoplastes found in hypersaline mats at Salin-de-Giraud, Camargue, France migrate to the upper layer of the mat during the day and are spread homogenously through the mat at night. An in vitro experiment using P. uncinatum also demonstrated this species' tendency to migrate in order to avoid damaging radiation. These migrations are usually the result of some sort of photomovement, although other forms of taxis can also play a role.

Many species of cyanobacteria are capable of gliding. Gliding is a form of cell movement that differs from crawling or swimming in that it does not rely on any obvious external organ or change in cell shape and it occurs only in the presence of a substrate. Gliding in filamentous cyanobacteria appears to be powered by a "slime jet" mechanism, in which the cells extrude a gel that expands quickly as it hydrates providing a propulsion force, although some unicellular cyanobacteria use type IV pili for gliding. Individual cells in a trichome have two sets of pores for extruding slime. Each set is organized in a ring at the cell septae and extrudes slime at an acute angle. The sets extrude slime in opposite directions and so only one set is likely to be activated during gliding. An alternative hypothesis is that the cells use contractive elements that produce undulations running over the surface inside the slime tube like an earthworm. The trichomes rotate in a spiral fashion, the angle of which corresponds with the pitch angle of Castenholz's contractile trichomes.

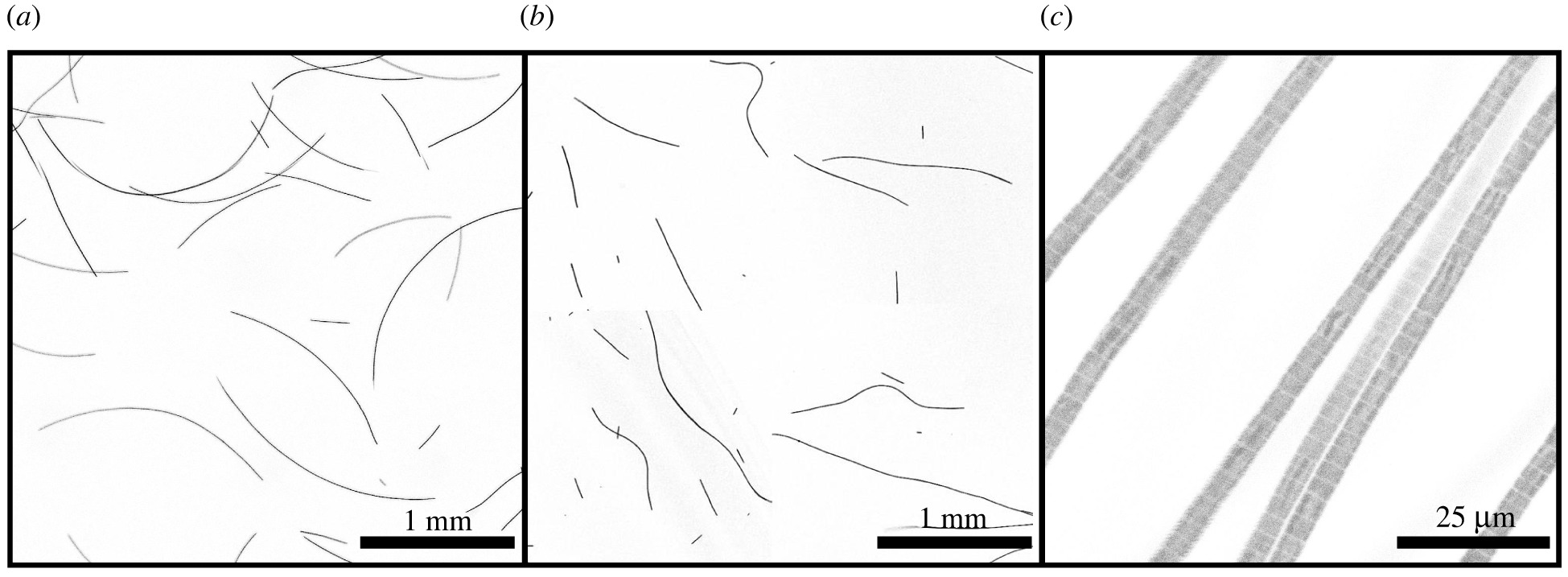
(a) Under ideal conditions active gliding specimens of Oscillatoria lutea appear as long thin curved filaments. (b) When rendered inactive, for example by being briefly cooled, the same filaments adopt a more random shape. (c) Under higher magnification O. lutea is seen to be composed of one-cell-wide strands of connected cells.

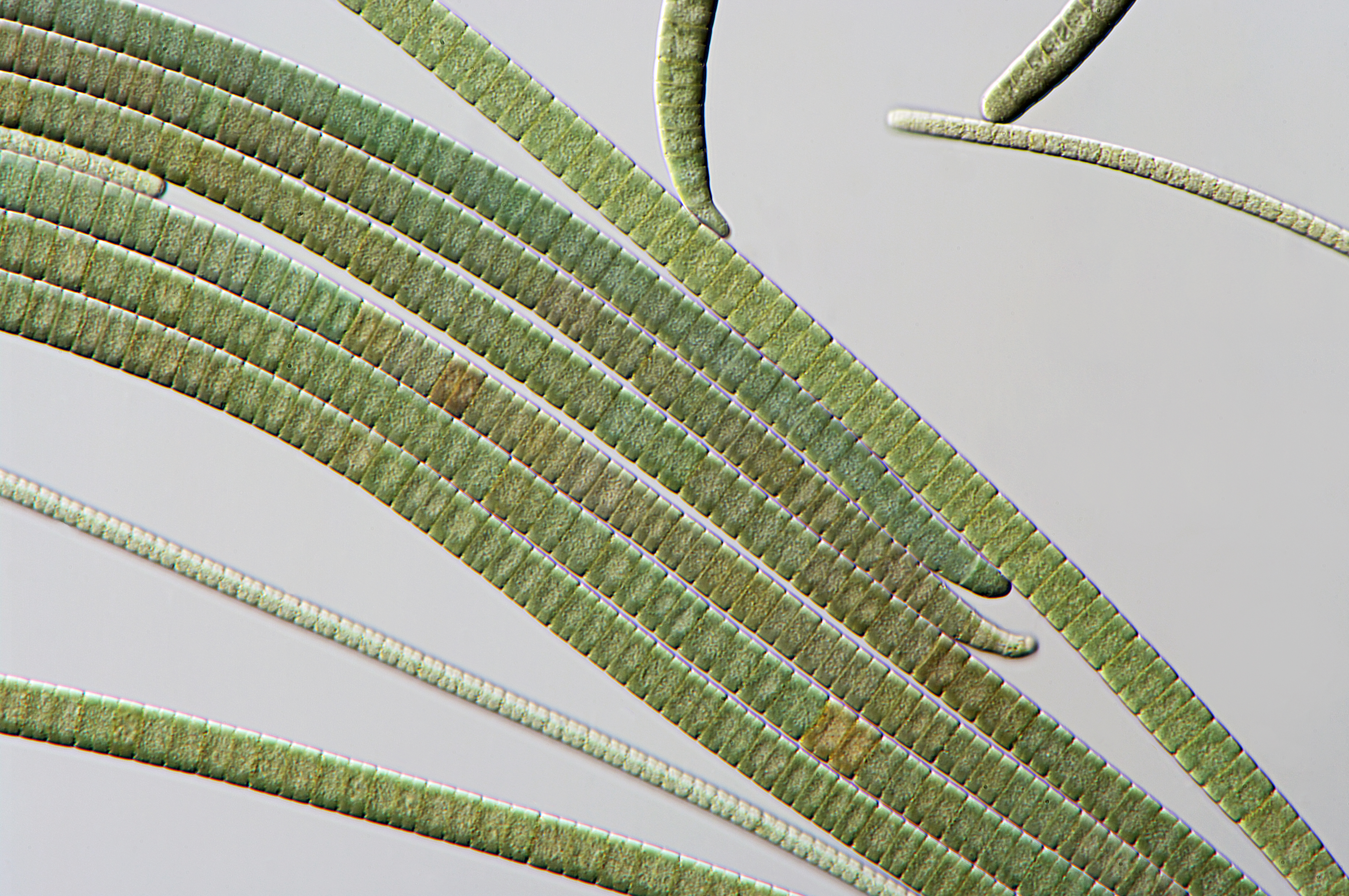
Oscillatoria are capable of a waving motion

The cells appear to coordinate their gliding direction by an electrical potential that establishes polarity in the trichomes, and thus establishes a "head" and the "tail". Trichomes usually reverse their polarity randomly with an average period on the order of minutes to hours. Many species also form a semi-rigid sheath that is left behind as a hollow tube as the trichome moves forward. When the trichome reverses direction, it can move back into the sheath or break out.

Oscillatoria is a genus of filamentous cyanobacterium named after the oscillation in its movement. Filaments in colonies slide back and forth against each other until the whole mass is reoriented to its light source. Oscillatoria is mainly blue-green or brown-green and is commonly found in watering-troughs. It reproduces by fragmentation forming long filaments of cells which can break into fragments called hormogonia. The hormogonia can then grow into new, longer filaments.

== See also ==
- Bacterial cellular morphologies
- Colonial morphology
