= O. princeps =

O. princeps may refer to:

- Ochotona princeps, the American pika, a mammal species found in western North America
- Oscillatoria princeps, a cyanobacterium species in the genus Oscillatoria
