= Phormidium willei =

Scientific classification
- Domain: Bacteria
- Kingdom: Bacillati
- Phylum: Cyanobacteriota
- Class: Cyanophyceae
- Order: Oscillatoriales
- Family: Oscillatoriaceae
- Genus: Phormidium
- Species: P. willei

Binomial name
- Phormidium willei (N. L. Gardner) Anagnostidis & Komárek

Species of bacterium

Phormidium willei is a species of bacteria that is able to photosynthesize to make food, similarly to plants.

== Anatomy ==
Bacteria of the genus Phormidium occur in rows of cells of similar size. They form filaments called trichomes. Many trichomes are enveloped in a firm casing, but in this genus the casing is almost non-existent. This gives the filaments easier mobility in all directions.

== Nitrogen fixing ability ==
This species of Phormidium is able to fix nitrogen, but unlike other bacteria, it is uncertain whether or not it has cells specialized for that particular purpose.

== Hormogonia ==
Fragments of filaments of Phormidium willei are called hormogonia. They consist of dozens of cells, which sometimes break off to reproduce by establishing new colonies.

== Danger to Humans ==
Like other species of cyanobacteria, this species can cause skin irritation in humans who come in close contact with them in the tropics.
