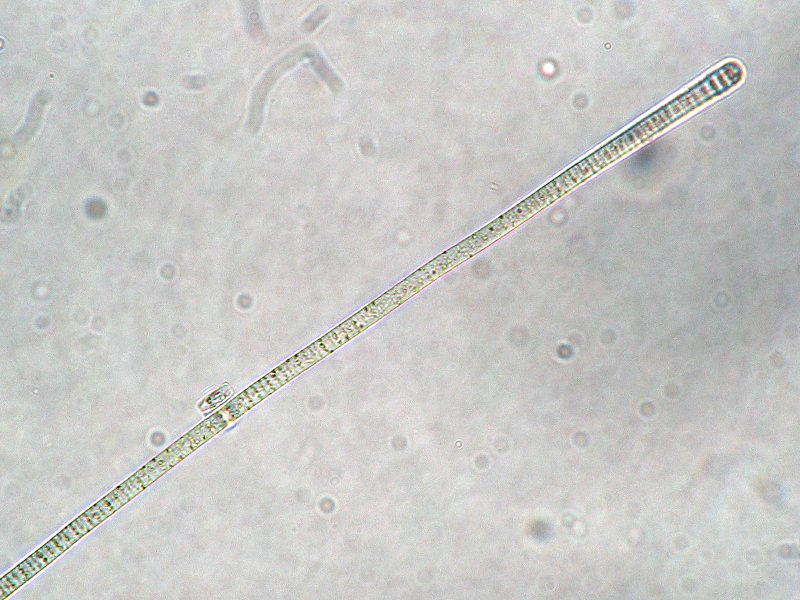
- Oscillatoria brevis

Scientific classification
- Domain: Bacteria
- Kingdom: Bacillati
- Phylum: Cyanobacteriota
- Class: Cyanophyceae
- Order: Oscillatoriales
- Family: Oscillatoriaceae
- Genus: Oscillatoria
- Species: O. brevis

Binomial name
- Oscillatoria brevis Kützing ex Gomont 1892

= Oscillatoria brevis =

Species of bacterium

Oscillatoria brevis is a species of the genus Oscillatoria first identified in 1892. It is a blue-green filamentous cyanobacterium, which can be found in brackish and fresh waterways. O. brevis can also be isolated from soil.

Oscillatoria brevis is a mesophile but can bear a temperature of -16°C, and can perform photosynthesis at a temperature of 70°C. It is a photoautotroph, containing Chlorophyll a and c-phycocyanin, but can perform anoxygenic photosynthesis by reducing sulfur. It is able to fix nitrogen, and can be cultured from soils. It, along with other nitrogen fixing cyanobacteria found in the soil, has been found to positively correlate with soil richness and the microbe density. O. brevis has also been shown to be tolerant of some heavy metal ions, namely copper, silver, zinc, and cadmium.Oscillatoria is able to glide via microfibrils. The genus name Oscillatoria is in reference to the look of oscillation when gliding. The species name, brevis, is Latin for short or small, yet the microbe is 10 μm wide and length varies in the genus from 5–70 μm.

== Metabolites ==
Oscillatoria brevis is identified as an cyanobacteria that produces Geosmin, a compound with a heavy earthy smell, which correlates with chlorophyll production. Like many cyanobacteria, O. brevis have lipopolysaccharides which can cause illness in humans and animals through ingestion or through an open wound. Other species in the Oscillatoria genus have been identified to have genes for producing cytotoxin, cylindrospermopsin, along with two neurotoxins, anatoxin-a and homoanatoxin-a.
