= Heterocyst =

Nitrogen-fixing cells

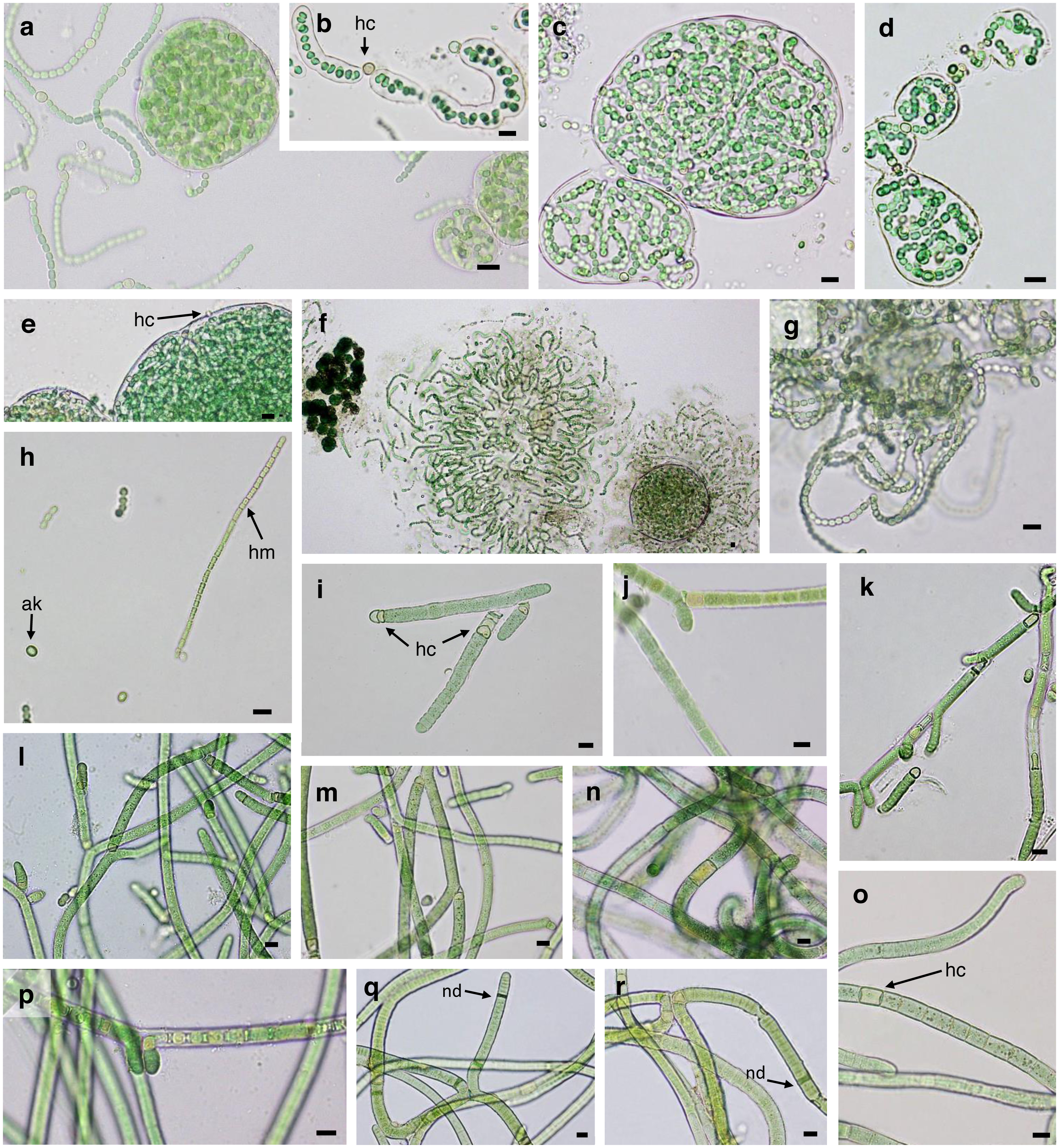
Microphotographs of heterocystous cyanobacteria A–F: Nostoc commune G–H: Nostoc calcicola I–M: Tolypothrix distorta N–R: Scytonema hyalinum Scale bar = 10 μm. Abbreviations: hc - heterocyst, ak - akinete, hm - hormogonium, nd - necridia

Heterocysts or heterocytes are specialized nitrogen-fixing cells formed during nitrogen starvation by some filamentous cyanobacteria, such as Nostoc, Cylindrospermum, and Anabaena. They fix nitrogen from dinitrogen (N_{2}) in the air using the enzyme nitrogenase, in order to provide the cells in the filament with nitrogen for biosynthesis.

Nitrogenase is inactivated by oxygen, so the heterocyst must create a microanaerobic environment. The heterocysts' unique structure and physiology require a global modification in gene expression. For example, heterocysts:

- produce three additional cell walls, including one of glycolipid that forms a hydrophobic barrier to oxygen and carbon dioxide
- produce nitrogenase and other proteins involved in nitrogen fixation
- degrade photosystem II, which produces oxygen (oxygen inactivates nitrogenase)
- up-regulate glycolytic enzymes
- produce proteins that scavenge any remaining oxygen
- contain polar plugs composed of cyanophycin which slows down cell-to-cell diffusion

Cyanobacteria usually obtain a fixed carbon (carbohydrate) by photosynthesis. The lack of water-splitting in photosystem II prevents heterocysts from performing photosynthesis, so the vegetative cells provide them with carbohydrates, which is thought to be sucrose. The fixed carbon and nitrogen sources are exchanged through channels between the cells in the filament. Heterocysts maintain photosystem I, allowing them to generate ATP by cyclic photophosphorylation.

Single heterocysts develop about every 9-15 cells, producing a one-dimensional pattern along the filament. The interval between heterocysts remains approximately constant even though the cells in the filament are dividing. The bacterial filament can be seen as a multicellular organism with two distinct yet interdependent cell types. Such behavior is highly unusual in prokaryotes and may have been the first example of multicellular patterning in evolution. Once a heterocyst has formed it cannot revert to a vegetative cell. Certain heterocyst-forming bacteria can differentiate into spore-like cells called akinetes or motile cells called hormogonia, making them the most phenotypically versatile of all prokaryotes.

== Gene expression ==
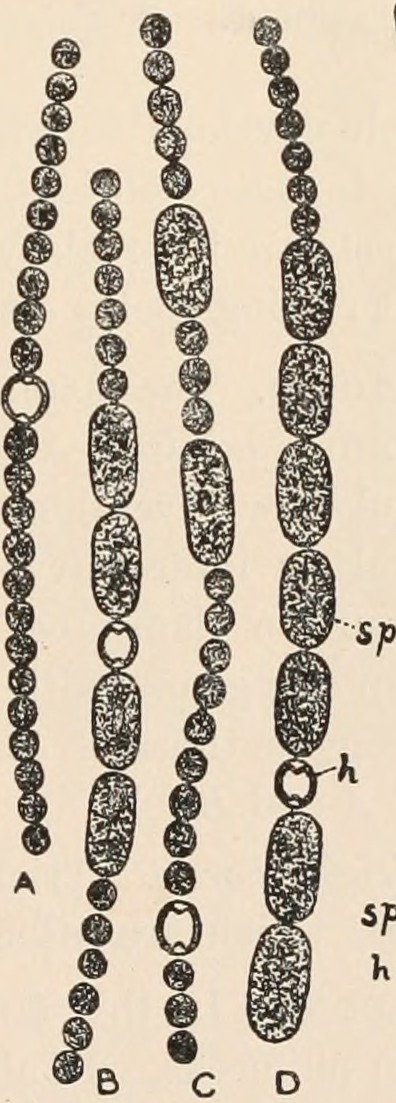
Illustration of Anabaena inaequalis, where heterocysts are labeled with letter h

In low nitrogen environments, heterocyst differentiation is triggered by the transcriptional regulator NtcA. NtcA influences heterocyst differentiation by signaling proteins involved in the process of heterocyst differentiation. For instance, NtcA controls the expression of several genes, including HetR, which is crucial for heterocyst differentiation as it up-regulates other genes such as hetR, patS, and hepA by binding to their promoter and thus acting as a transcription factor. It is also worthy to note that the expression of ntcA and HetR are dependent on each other and their presence promotes heterocyst differentiation even in the presence of nitrogen. It has also been recently found that other genes such as PatA and hetP regulate heterocyst differentiation. PatA patterns the heterocysts along the filaments, and it is also important for cell division. PatS influences the heterocyst patterning by inhibiting heterocyst differentiation when a group of differentiating cells come together to form a pro- heterocyst (immature heterocyst). Heterocyst maintenance is dependent on an enzyme called hetN. Heterocyst formation is inhibited by the presence of a fixed nitrogen source, such as ammonium or nitrate.

== Heterocyst formation ==
The following sequences take place in formation of heterocysts from a vegetative cell:

- The cell enlarges.
- Granular inclusions decrease.
- Photosynthetic lammel reorients.
- The wall finally becomes triple-layered. These three layers develop outside the cell's outer layer.
  - The middle layer is homogeneous.
  - The inner layer is laminated.
- The senescent heterocyst undergoes vacuolation and finally breaks off from the filament causing fragmentation. These fragments are called hormogonia (singular hormogonium) and undergo asexual reproduction.

The cyanobacteria that form heterocysts are divided into the orders Nostocales and Stigonematales, which form simple and branching filaments respectively. Together they form a monophyletic group, with very low genetic variability.

== Symbiotic relationships ==
Division of labor in cyanobacteria Some cells within clonal filaments differentiate into heterocysts (large, round cell, right). Heterocysts abandon oxygen-producing photosynthesis in order to fix nitrogen with the oxygen-sensitive enzyme nitrogenase. Vegetative and heterocyst cells divide labor by exchanging sugars and nitrogen.

The bacteria may also enter a symbiotic relationship with certain plants. In such a relationship, the bacteria do not respond to the availability of nitrogen, but to signals produced by the plant for heterocyst differentiation. Up to 60% of the cells can become heterocysts, providing fixed nitrogen to the plant in return for fixed carbon. The signal produced by the plant and the stage of heterocyst differentiation it affects is unknown. Presumably, the symbiotic signal generated by the plant acts before NtcA activation as hetR is required for symbiotic heterocyst differentiation. For the symbiotic association with the plant, ntcA is needed as bacteria with mutated ntcA cannot infect plants.

=== Anabaena-Azolla ===
A notable symbiotic relationship is that of Anabaena azollae (Note: Currently Trichormus azollae (Strasburger 1884) Komárek and Anagnostidis 1989. Synonyms: Nostoc azollae Strasburger 1883, Anabaena azollae Strasburger 1884, Desikacharya azollae (Strasburger 1884) Saraf et al. 2019.) cyanobacteria with Azolla plants. Anabaena reside on the stems and within leaves of Azolla plants. The Azolla plant undergoes photosynthesis and provides fixed carbon for the Anabaena to use as an energy source for dinitrogenases in the heterocyst cells. In return, the heterocysts are able to provide the vegetative cells and the Azolla plant with fixed nitrogen in the form of ammonia which supports growth of both organisms.

This symbiotic relationship is exploited by humans in agriculture. In Asia, Azolla plants containing Anabaena species are used as biofertilizer where nitrogen is limiting as well as in animal feed. Different strains of Azolla-Anabaena are suited for different environments and may lead to differences in crop production. Rice crops grown with Azolla-Anabaena as biofertilizer have been shown to result in a much greater quantity and quality of produce compared to crops without the cyanobacteria. Azolla-Anabaena plants are grown before and after rice crops are planted. As the Azolla-Anabaena plants grow, they accumulate fixed nitrogen due to the actions of the nitrogenase enzymes and organic carbon from photosynthesis by the Azolla plants and Anabaena vegetative cells. When the Azolla-Anabaena plants die and decompose, they release high amounts of fixed nitrogen, phosphorus, organic carbon, and many other nutrients into the soil, providing a rich environment ideal for the growth of rice crops.

The Anabaena-Azolla relationship has also been explored as a possible method of removing pollutants from the environment, a process known as phytoremediation. Anabaena sp. together with Azolla caroliniana has been shown to be successful in removing uranium, a toxic pollutant caused by mining, as well as the heavy metals mercury(II), chromium(III), and chromium(VI) from contaminated waste water.

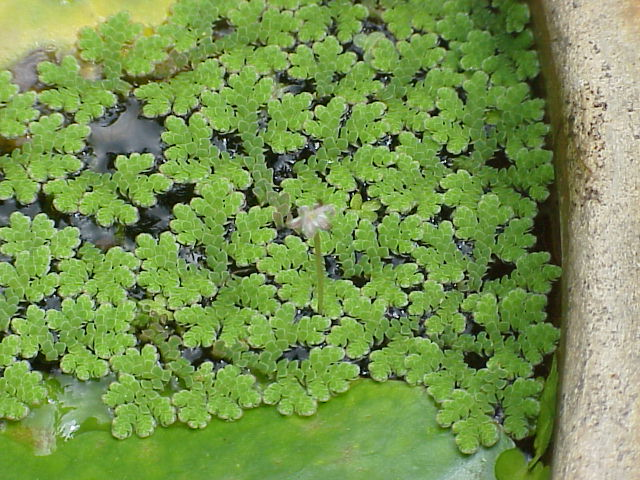
Azolla caroliniana plant

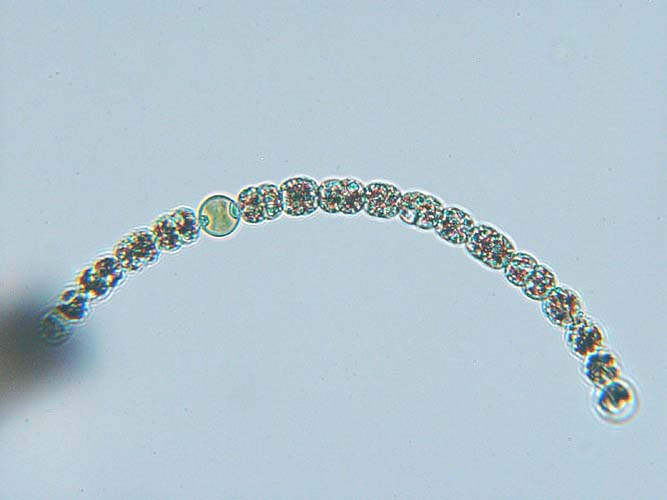
Anabaena circinalis filament

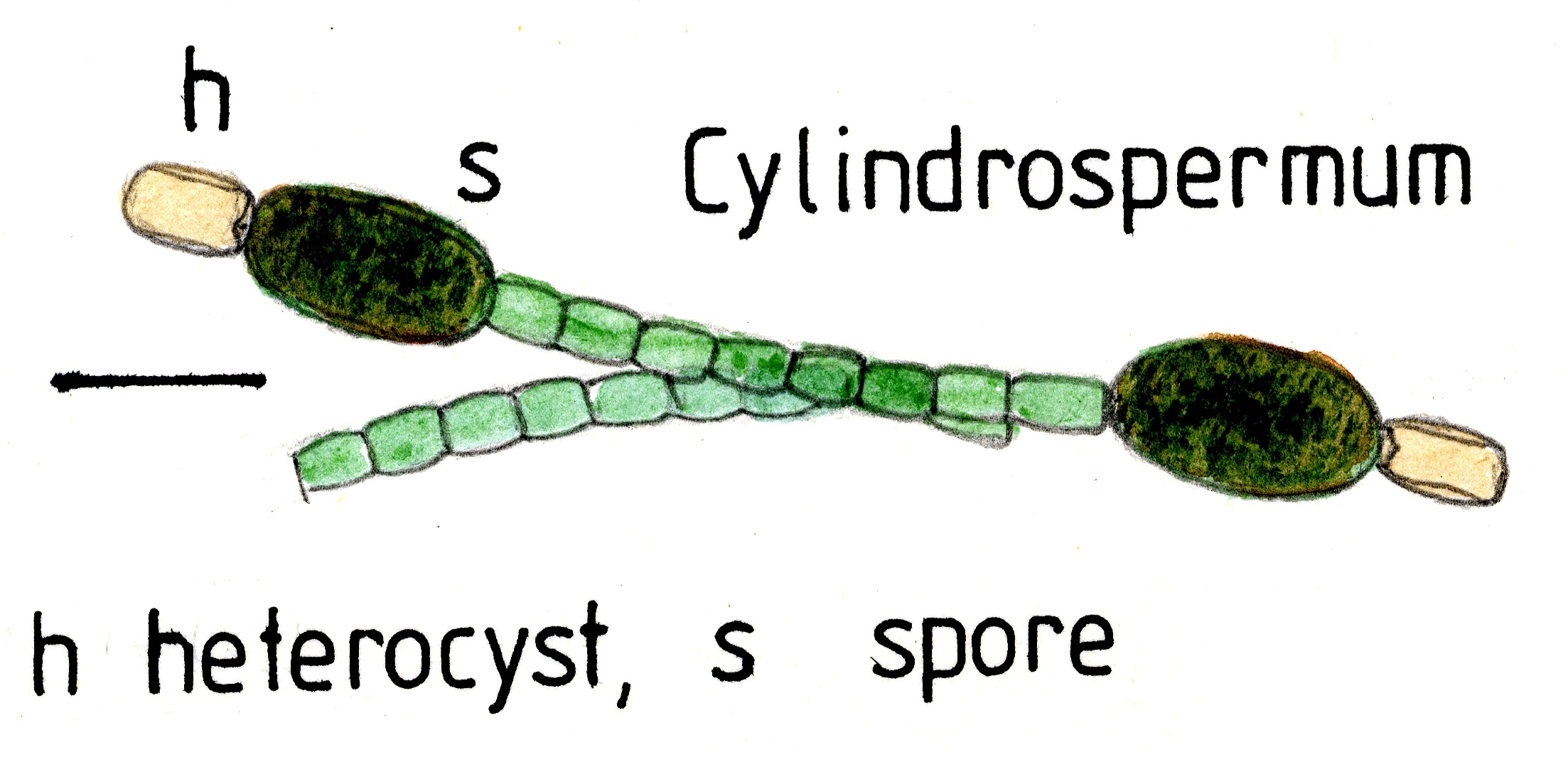
Cylindrospermum filament
