= Pseudanabaena limnetica =

Scientific classification
- Domain: Bacteria
- Kingdom: Bacillati
- Phylum: Cyanobacteriota
- Class: Cyanophyceae
- Order: Synechococcales
- Family: Pseudanabaenaceae
- Genus: Pseudanabaena
- Species: P. limnetica

Binomial name
- Pseudanabaena limnetica (Lemmermann) Komárek

Freshwater cyanobacteria

Pseudanabaena limnetica is a species of freshwater cyanobacteria in the genus Oscillatoria. It is a facultative anaerobic organism, so it uses hydrogen sulfide for a hydrogen source in photosynthesis when it is abundant or when in anaerobic conditions; in aerobic conditions, it uses water instead. It is of interest in phylogeny of cyanobacteria because its usage of aerobic and anaerobic hydrogen sources shows that both are compatible. It is being studied as evidence of species' changes from using hydrogen sulfide to water.
