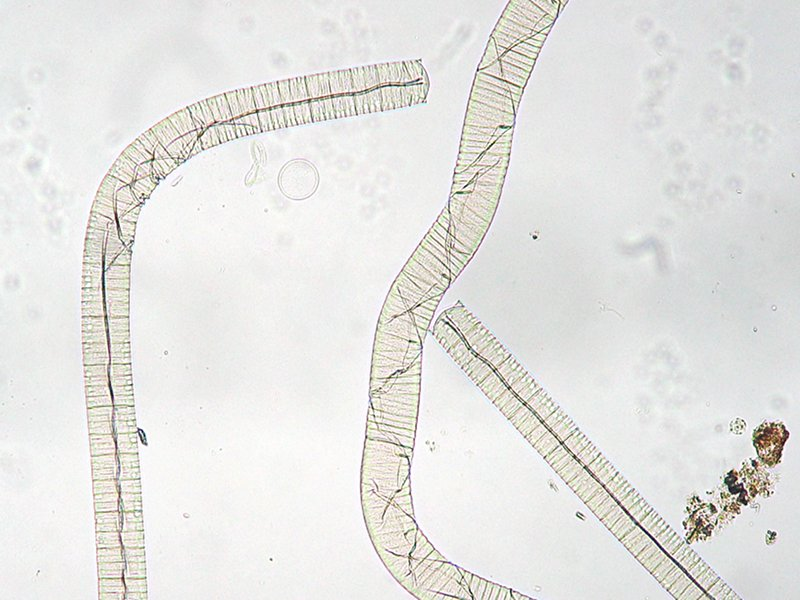
- Oscillatoria princeps

Scientific classification
- Domain: Bacteria
- Kingdom: Bacillati
- Phylum: Cyanobacteriota
- Class: Cyanophyceae
- Order: Oscillatoriales
- Family: Oscillatoriaceae
- Genus: Oscillatoria; Vaucher ex Gomont, 1822

Type species
- Oscillatoria princeps Vaucher ex Gomont

Species
- See list in body text

= Oscillatoria =

Genus of bacteria

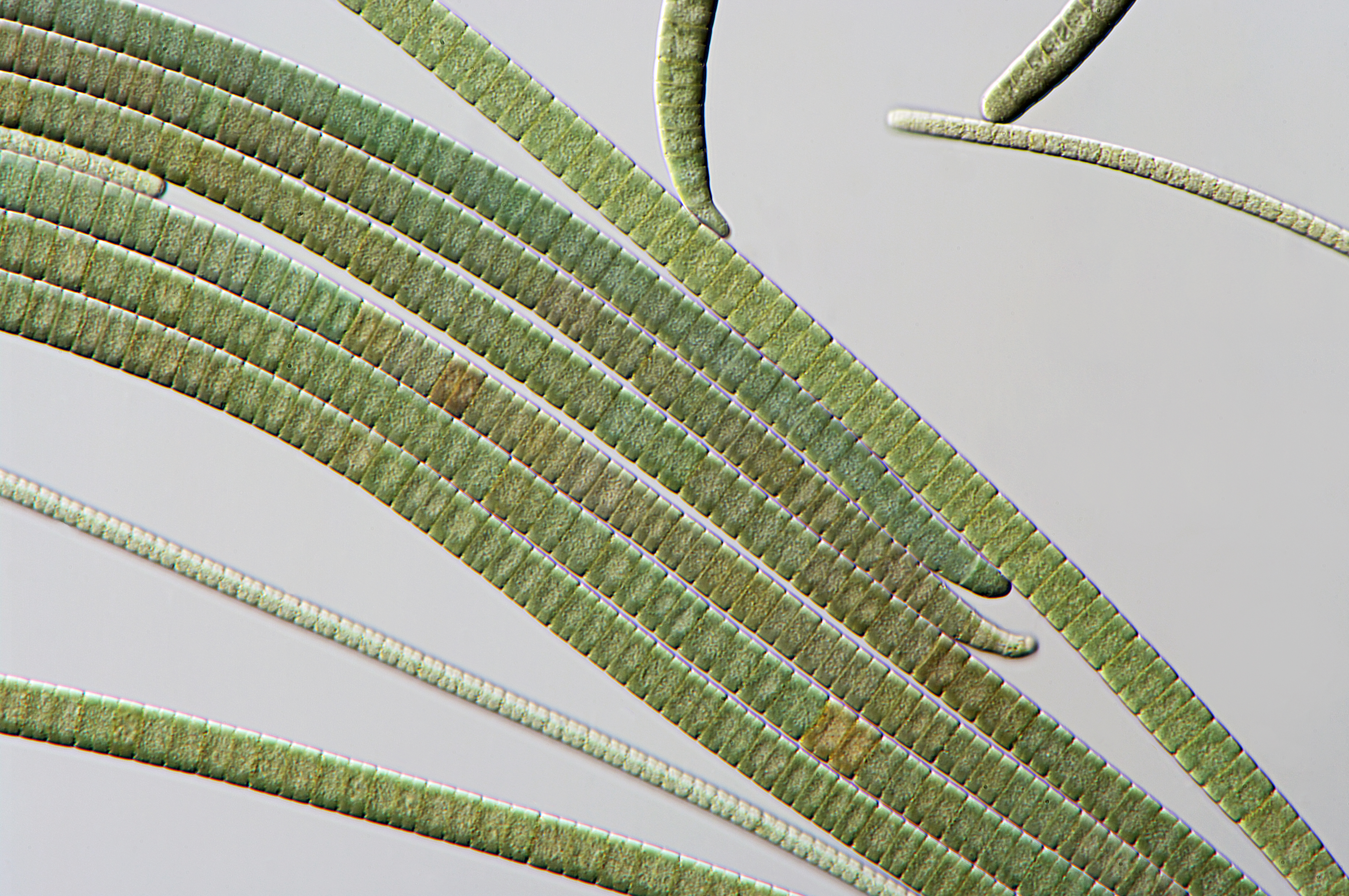
Oscillatoria filaments

Oscillatoria is a genus of filamentous cyanobacteria. It is often found in freshwater environments. Its name refers to the oscillating motion of its filaments as they slide against each other to position the colony to face a light source. Oscillatoria uses photosynthesis to survive and reproduce. Each filament of Oscillatoria consists of a row of cells called a trichome. The tip of the trichome oscillates like a pendulum.

Reproduction takes place asexually by fragmentation. Usually the filament breaks into a number of fragments called hormogonia. Each hormogonium consist of one or more cells and grows into a filament by cell division in one direction. Hormogonia has capacity for locomotion.

As a result of recent genetic analyses, several new genera were erected from this genus, e.g. Tenebriella.

== Research ==
Oscillatoria are the subject of research into the natural production of butylated hydroxytoluene (BHT), an antioxidant, food additive, and industrial chemical.

Cyclic peptides called venturamides, which may have anti-malarial activity, have been isolated from bacteria in this genus. They are the first peptides with this activity to have been found in cyanobacteria.

Serinolamide A is a cannabinoid structurally related to Anandamide that has been found to occur in Oscillatoria species.

== Species ==
Oscillatoria contains the following species:

- Oscillatoria amoena (Kützing) Gomont
- Oscillatoria anguiformis (P. González Guerrero) Anagnostidis
- Oscillatoria anguina Bory ex Gomont
- Oscillatoria annae van Goor
- Oscillatoria bonnemaisonii (P. L. Crouan & H. M. Crouan) P. L. Crouan & H. M. Crouan ex Gomont
- Oscillatoria brevis Kützing ex Gomont
- Oscillatoria chalybea Mertens ex Gomont
- Oscillatoria chilkensis Biswas
- Oscillatoria crassa (Rao) Anagnostidis
- Oscillatoria croasdaleae Kamat
- Oscillatoria curviceps C. Agardh ex Gomont
- Oscillatoria depauperata (Copeland) Anagnostidis
- Oscillatoria engelmanniana Gaidukov
- Oscillatoria euboeica Anagnostidis
- Oscillatoria fischeri Corda ex Forti
- Oscillatoria fracta Carlson
- Oscillatoria froelichii Kützing ex Gomont
- Oscillatoria funiformis (Vouk) Komárek
- Oscillatoria indica P. C. Silva
- Oscillatoria jenensis G. Schmid
- Oscillatoria levis (Gardner) Anagnostidis
- Oscillatoria limosa C. Agardh ex Gomont
- Oscillatoria limnetica Lemmermann
- Oscillatoria mahabaleshwarensis Kamat
- Oscillatoria major Vaucher ex Hansgirg
- Oscillatoria margaritifera Kützing ex Gomont
- Oscillatoria miniata (Zanardini) Hauck ex Gomont
- Oscillatoria minutissima P. González
- Oscillatoria muralis (Dillwyn) C. Agardh
- Oscillatoria nitida Schkorbatov
- Oscillatoria nylstromica Claassen
- Oscillatoria obscura Brühl & Biswas
- Oscillatoria olivaceobrunnea L. Hoffmann & V. Demoulin
- Oscillatoria princeps Vaucher ex Gomont
- Oscillatoria proboscidea Gomont
- Oscillatoria pulchra Lindstedt
- Oscillatoria rhamphoidea Anagnostidis
- Oscillatoria ribeyi F. E. Drouet
- Oscillatoria rubescens De Candolle ex Gomont
- Oscillatoria sancta Kützing ex Gomont
- Oscillatoria subbrevis Schmidle
- Oscillatoria subcapitata Ponomarev
- Oscillatoria tapetiformis Zenker ex Gomont
- Oscillatoria tenioides (Bory de Saint-Vincent) Bory de Saint-Vincent ex Gomont
- Oscillatoria trichoides Szafer
- Oscillatoria versicolor G. Martens ex Prain
- Oscillatoria willei N. L. Gardner
