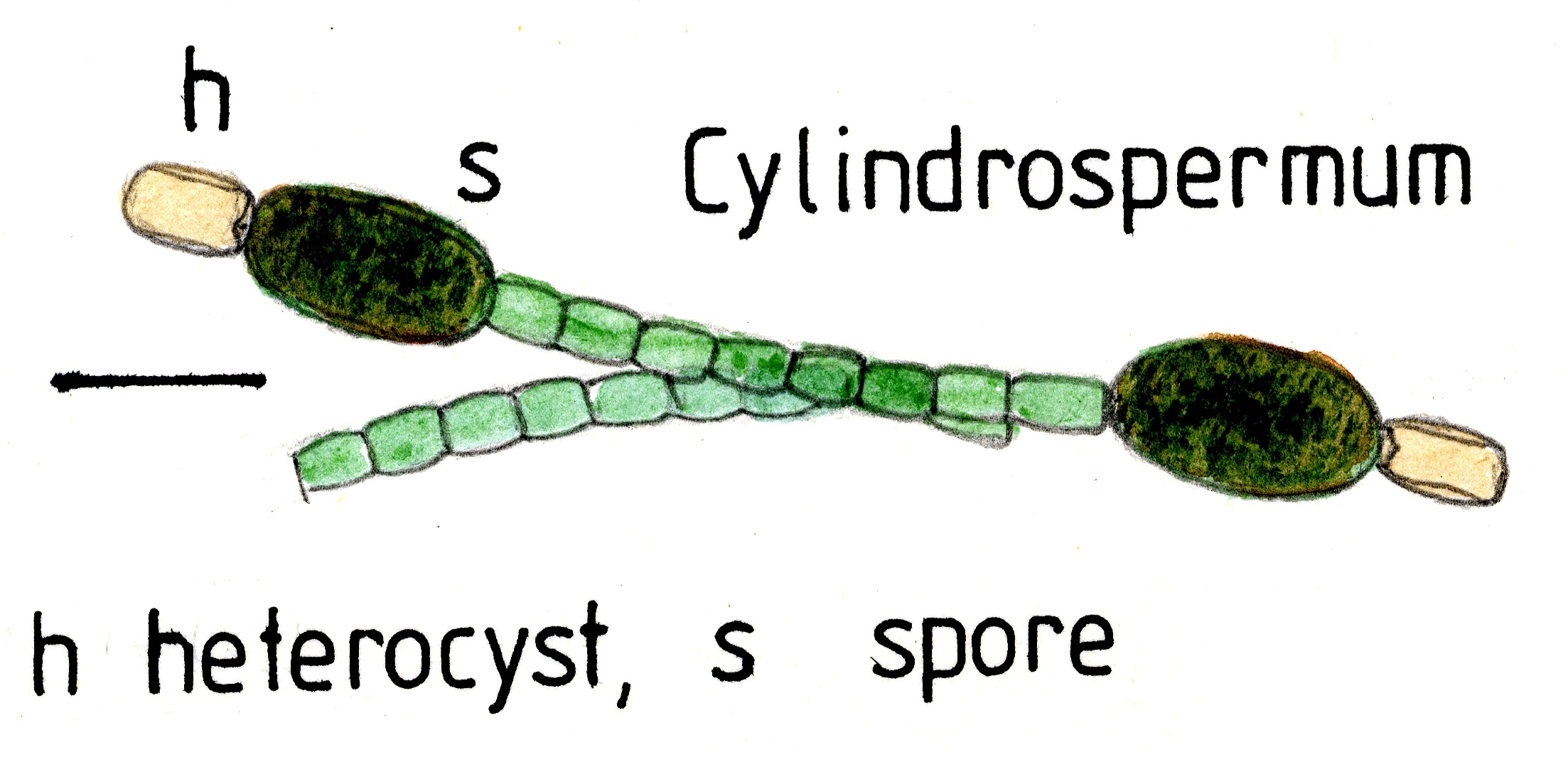
- Illustration of Cylindrospermum stagnale. h, heterocyst; sp, resting spore

Scientific classification
- Domain: Bacteria
- Kingdom: Bacillati
- Phylum: Cyanobacteriota
- Class: Cyanophyceae
- Order: Nostocales
- Family: Nostocaceae
- Genus: Cylindrospermum; Kützing ex Bornet & Flahault, 1886

Species
- C. alatosporum; C. badium; C. catenatum; C. licheniforme; C. majus; C. marchicum; C. michailovskoense; C. moravicum; C. muscicola; C. pellucidum; C. siamensis; C. skujae; C. stagnale

= Cylindrospermum =

Genus of filamentous cyanobacteria found in terrestrial and aquatic environments

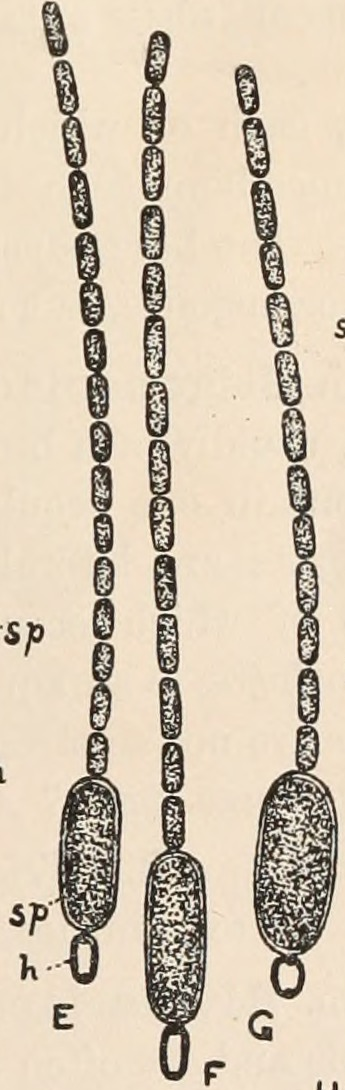
Illustration of "Cylindrospermum stagnale". h, heterocyst; sp, resting spore

Cylindrospermum is a genus of filamentous cyanobacteria found in terrestrial and aquatic environments. In terrestrial ecosystems, Cylindrospermum is found in soils, and in aquatic ones, it commonly grows as part of the periphyton on aquatic plants. The genus is heterocystous (nitrogen-fixing) cyanobacteria.
