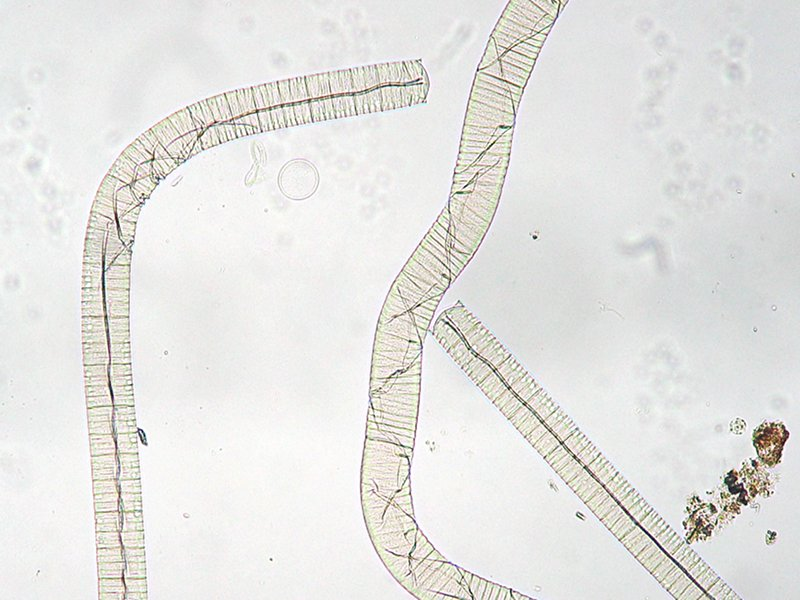
- Oscillatoria princeps trichomes showing the "stack of poker chips" appearance of stacked cells.

Scientific classification
- Domain: Bacteria
- Kingdom: Bacillati
- Phylum: Cyanobacteriota
- Class: Cyanophyceae
- Order: Oscillatoriales
- Family: Oscillatoriaceae
- Genus: Oscillatoria
- Species: O. princeps

Binomial name
- Oscillatoria princeps Vaucher ex Gomont, 1822

= Oscillatoria princeps =

Species of bacterium

Oscillatoria princeps is the type species (lectotype) of the cyanobacterial (blue green algal) genus Oscillatoria.

== Description ==
O. princeps is a large bacterium, dark blue green in colour due to the presence of two phycobilin pigments: phycocyanin and phycoerythrin. Individual filaments, called trichomes, are blue green to olive green in colour. Mature trichomes are straight and unconstricted in growth phase. Though constrictions were observed during reproduction. Distinct cross walls are present.

Each trichome comprises a single row of cells stacked one above the other. A cytoplasmic sheath is present around the cells which is very thin, hyaline and indistinct. The individual cells within a trichome are round in shape and much wider than they are long. When such cells are stacked one above the other in a trichome, it gives a "stack of poker chips" appearance, which is a characteristic feature of this species. The first cell in a trichome (the apical cell) is hemispherical with keritomized (irregular to radial thylakoid arrangement) content. The size of cells vary from 57.6 μm to 69.1 μm wide and 5.2 μm to 9.6 μm long. The ratio of cell length to width is 1:8.

A microscopic crack-like nick is found on the trichomes. Notches on individual cells were found at the inner side of the cell corresponding the slit on the trichome. When the cells are stacked one above the other, it results in the crack like structure. The number of notches in a single cell equals the number of slits on the trichome. One to three notches per slit were observed by Uma Rani et al. 2015.

== Growth and reproduction ==
Cell division takes place only in the transverse direction. Reproduction takes place only by vegetative methods namely fragmentation and hormogonia. Both the methods were observed in most of the study. Fragmentation takes place by the degradation of weakened cells or mechanically damaged cells. The trichome divides into smaller fragments. The cells of the fragment by repeated division develop into a new filament.

== Distribution ==
This species is ubiquitous in distribution. It is reported in both marine and fresh waters.
