= Oscillaria =

Scientific classification
- Domain: Eukaryota
- Clade: Diaphoretickes
- Clade: SAR
- Clade: Stramenopiles
- Phylum: Gyrista
- Subphylum: Ochrophytina
- Class: Bacillariophyceae
- Order: incertae sedis
- Genus: Oscillaria; Pollini (ru), 1816

Genus of single-celled organisms

Oscillaria is a genus of filamentous diatoms.
