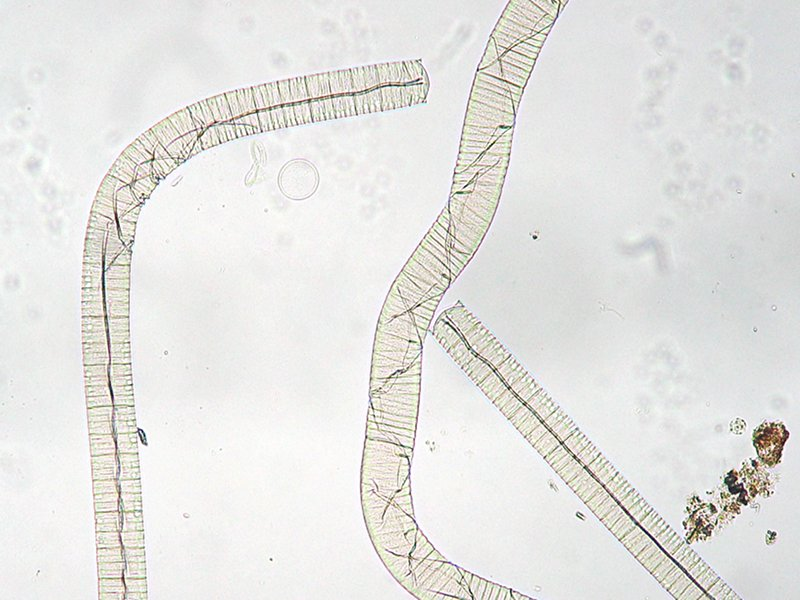
- Oscillatoria princeps

Scientific classification
- Domain: Bacteria
- Phylum: Cyanobacteria
- Class: Cyanophyceae
- Order: Oscillatoriales
- Family: Oscillatoriaceae (S. F. Gray) Harvey ex Kirchner

Genera
- Aerosakkonema Thu & M. M. Watanabe 2012; Ammassolinea Hašler et al. 2014; Argonema Skoupý and Dvořák 2022; Arturoa González Guerrero 1951; Aspalatia Ercegović 1927; Baaleninema Samylina et al. 2021; Blennothrix Kützing ex Anagnostidis & Komárek 1988; Calyptothrix Schopf 1968; Cephalophytarion Schopf 1968; Cirrosiphon Duvigneaud and Symoens 1951; Contrahofilum Nautiyal 1980; Cyanotrichospira Molinari and Guiry 2021; Eomicrocoleus Horodyski and Donaldson 1980; Filiconstrictosus Schopf and Blacic 1971; Halythrix Schopf 1968; Havrella Breton and Saulot 1986; Heliotrichum Wille ex Kirchner 1898; Koinonema Buch et al. 2017; Laspinema Heidari and Hauer 2018; Limnoraphis Komárek et al. 2013; Lyngbya C. Agardh ex Gomont 1892; Minutiafilum Nautiyal 1980; Moorea Engene et al. 2012; Obconicophycus Schopf and Blacic 1971; Okeania Engene et al. 2013; Oligoclonium Brooker-Klugh 1921; Oscillaria Bosc ex Engler 1892; Oscillatoria Vaucher ex Gomont 1892; Oscillatoriopsis Schopf 1968; Oxynema Chatchawan et al. 2012; Palaeolyngbya Schopf 1968; Palaeonostoc Nautiyal 1980; Paraplectonema Frémy 1930; Partitiofilum Schopf and Blacic 1971; Perforafilum Zimba et al. 2021; Phormidium Kützing ex Gomont 1892; Planktothricoides Suda and Watanabe 2002; Plectonema Thuret ex Gomont 1892; Polychlamydum W. & G.S.West 1897; Proaulopora Vologdin 1938; Pseudospirulina Pankow and Jahnke 1964; Rhicnonema Hofmann 1976; Siphonophycus Schopf 1968; Sodalinema Cellamare et al. 2018

= Oscillatoriaceae =

Family of bacteria

The Oscillatoriaceae are a family of cyanobacteria.
