= Hormogonium =

Motile filament of cells formed by some cyanobacteria

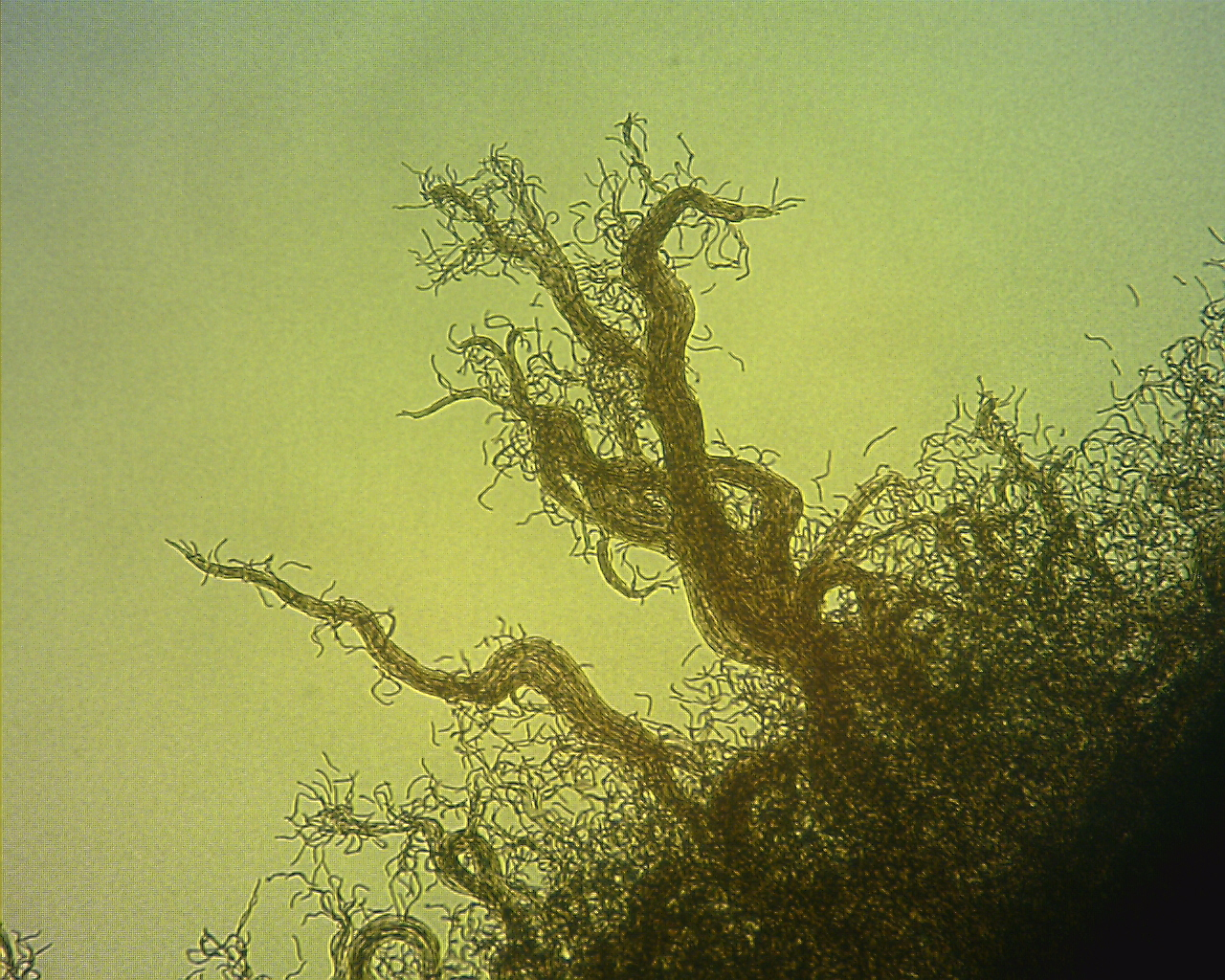
Nostoc with hormogonia

Hormogonia are motile filaments of cells formed by some cyanobacteria in the order Nostocales and Stigonematales. They are formed during vegetative reproduction in unicellular, filamentous cyanobacteria, and some may contain heterocysts and akinetes.

Cyanobacteria differentiate into hormogonia when exposed to an environmental stress or when placed in new media.

Hormogonium differentiation is crucial for the development of nitrogen-fixing plant cyanobacteria symbioses, in particular that between cyanobacteria of the genus Nostoc and their hosts. In response to a hormogonium-inducing factor (HIF) secreted by plant hosts, cyanobacterial symbionts differentiate into hormogonia and then dedifferentiate back into vegetative cells after about 96 hours. Hopefully, they have managed to reach the plant host by this time. The bacteria then differentiate specialized nitrogen-fixing cells called heterocysts and enter into a working symbiosis with the plant.

Depending on species, Hormogonia can be many hundreds of micrometers in length and can travel as fast as 11 μm/s. They move via gliding motility, requiring a wettable surface or a viscous substrate, such as agar for motion.
