= Scytonemin =

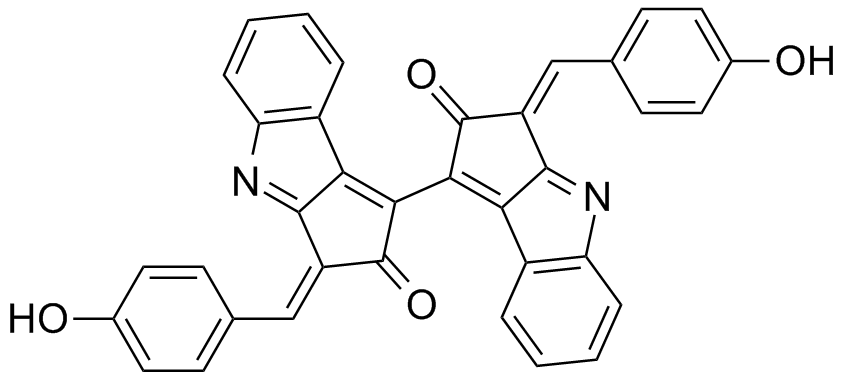

Names
- Preferred IUPAC name (3E,3′E)-3,3′-Bis[(4-hydroxyphenyl)methylidene][1,1′-bi(cyclopropa[b]indole)]-2,2′(3H,3′H)-dione
- Other names Scytonemin

Identifiers
CAS Number	152075-98-4
3D model (JSmol)	Interactive image
ChEBI	CHEBI:90127
ChEMBL	ChEMBL505177
ChemSpider	16736974
PubChem CID	135473381
UNII	VPQ7YG2DMW
CompTox Dashboard (EPA)	DTXSID60934418
- InChI: InChI=1S/C36H20N2O4/c39-21-13-9-19(10-14-21)17-25-33-29(23-5-1-3-7-27(23)37-33)31(35(25)41)32-30-24-6-2-4-8-28(24)38-34(30)26(36(32)42)18-20-11-15-22(40)16-12-20/h1-18,39-40H/b25-17+,26-18+ Key: CGZKSPLDUIRCIO-RPCRKUJJSA-N; InChI=1/C36H20N2O4/c39-21-13-9-19(10-14-21)17-25-33-29(23-5-1-3-7-27(23)37-33)31(35(25)41)32-30-24-6-2-4-8-28(24)38-34(30)26(36(32)42)18-20-11-15-22(40)16-12-20/h1-18,39-40H/b25-17+,26-18+ Key: CGZKSPLDUIRCIO-RPCRKUJJBK
- SMILES: C1=CC=C2N=C\3C(=C(C(=O)/C3=C/C4=CC=C(C=C4)O)C5=C6C(=NC7=CC=CC=C67)/C(=C\C8=CC=C(C=C8)O)/C5=O)C2=C1

Properties
Chemical formula	C_{36}H_{20}N_{2}O_{4}
Molar mass	544.6 g/mol
Appearance	brown solid
Solubility	25mg/ml DMSO
UV-vis (λ_{max})	370nm
- Except where otherwise noted, data are given for materials in their standard state (at 25 °C [77 °F], 100 kPa). verify (what is ?) Infobox references

Scytonemin is a secondary metabolite and a pigment in the extracellular matrix (sheath), synthesized by many strains of cyanobacteria, including Nostoc, Scytonema, Calothrix, Lyngbya, Rivularia, Chlorogloeopsis, and Hyella. Scytonemin-synthesizing cyanobacteria often inhabit highly insolated terrestrial, freshwater and coastal environments such as deserts, semideserts, rocks, cliffs, marine intertidal flats, and hot springs.

The pigment was originally discovered in 1849 by Swiss botanist Carl Nägeli, although the structure remained unsolved until 1993. It is an indole alkaloid that is an aromatic compound, built from two identical condensation products of tryptophanyl- and tyrosyl-derived subunits linked through a carbon-carbon bond. Depending on the redox conditions, it can exist in two inter-convertible forms: a more common oxidized yellow-brown form which is insoluble in water and only slightly soluble in organic solvents, such as pyridine, and a reduced form with bright red color that is more soluble in organic solvents. Scytonemin absorbs very strongly and very broadly across the UV-C-UV-B-UV-A-violet-blue regions of the electromagnetic spectrum, with an in vivo maximum absorption at 370 nm and an in vitro maximum absorption at 386 and 252 nm, and with smaller peaks at 212, 278, and 300 nm.

It is believed that scytonemin acts as a highly efficient protective biomolecule (sunscreen) that filters out damaging high frequency ultraviolet rays while at the same time allowing the transmittance of wavelengths necessary for photosynthesis. Its biosynthesis in cyanobacteria is mostly triggered by exposure to UV-A and UV-B wavelengths.

Recently, Couradeau and coworkers found that cyanobacterial soil crusts warm the soil surface by as much as 10 °C through the production and accumulation of scytonemin pigments. This effect is due to the dissipation of the absorbed photons by the scytonemin molecules into heat.

== Biosynthesis ==
The biosynthesis in Lyngbya aestuarii was recently explored by Balskus, Case, and Walsh. It proceeds by the conversion of L-tryptophan to 3-indole pyruvic acid, followed by coupling to p-hydroxyphenylpyruvic acid. Cyclization of the resultant β-ketoacid yields a tricyclic ketone. Oxidation and dimerization yields the completed natural product. Three scytonemin biosynthetic enzymes are necessary, denoted as ScyA-C.

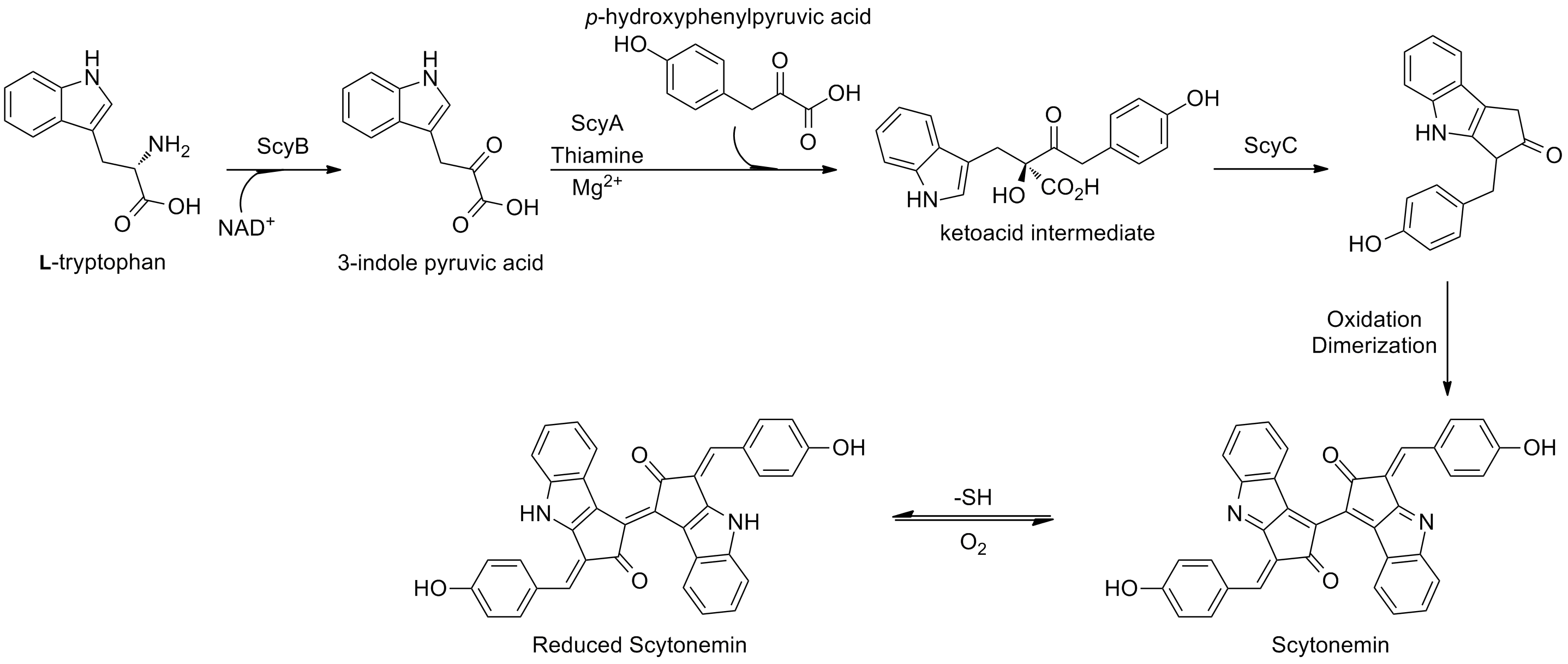
Scytonemin biosynthesis in Lyngbya aestuarii.
