= Cyphellostereum imperfectum =

Scientific classification
- Kingdom: Fungi
- Division: Basidiomycota
- Class: Agaricomycetes
- Order: Agaricales
- Family: Hygrophoraceae
- Genus: Cyphellostereum
- Species: C. imperfectum

Binomial name
- Cyphellostereum imperfectum Lücking, Barillas & Dal-Forno (2012)
- Holotype: Biotopo del Quetzal, Guatemala

Species of lichen

Cyphellostereum imperfectum is a species of basidiolichen in the family Hygrophoraceae. Like other members of its genus, it forms a partnership between a fungus and cyanobacterium, creating thin crusts that spread across tree bark in misty mountain forests. The species was discovered in Guatemala's cloud forests and has since been found in the Galápagos Islands, where it grows on moss-covered branches in humid highland zones. It has a distinctive white, cottony edge and turquoise-blue color when fresh.

== Taxonomy ==
Cyphellostereum imperfectum is a cyanobacterial basidiolichen in the family Hygrophoraceae. It was formally described in 2012 by Robert Lücking, J. Barillas and Manuela Dal Forno, based on material collected from the cloud forests in the Biotopo del Quetzal nature reserve in Baja Verapaz Department, Guatemala. The species differs from the type of the genus (C. phyllogenum) and from C. nitidum in having a conspicuous white prothallus and hypothallus and by its densely intertwined, wavy hyphae that wrap each cyanobacterial filament, leaving small gaps between them. DNA sequence data (nuLSU and ITS rDNA) confirm that it is a distinct lineage within Cyphellostereum.

== Description ==
The thallus of Cyphellostereum imperfectum is a thin, crust‑like mat up to about 5 cm (2 in) across, tightly appressed to bark but edged by a ragged, cottony white margin formed by non‑lichenized hyphae (the prothallus). When fresh it is turquoise‑blue; on drying it turns dull greenish.

Inside the thallus, the fungus partners with a filamentous cyanobacterium (Rhizonema). Each cyanobacterial thread is sheathed by 2–3 μm‑wide, colorless fungal hyphae that twist and branch, giving the sheath a sinuous outline and leaving tiny air spaces. Individual photobiont cells measure 7–10 μm long by 3–6 μm wide and occasional heterocysts (nitrogen‑fixing cells) are present. No fruiting bodies (basidiocarps) have yet been seen, and clamp connections are absent. Unlike the Mauritian relative Cyphellostereum bicolor, which lacks a persistent white hypothallus, has a looser hyphal sheath and produces resupinate hymenophores, C. imperfectum keeps its conspicuous white hypothallus, encloses each cyanobacterial filament in a tight weave of fungal hyphae, and has never been seen to form such fruiting bodies.

== Habitat and distribution ==
The holotype comes from a moist montane rainforest at 1,600 to 1,800 m (5,200 to 5,900 ft) elevation along the Quetzal Reserve trail in central Guatemala. In the Galápagos Islands the species is so far known from a single collection in the Miconia shrubland of Santa Cruz Island (roughly 500 m elevation). There it was found growing over leafy liverwort mats on tree branches within a humid, mist‑prone zone dominated by Miconia robinsoniana and scattered Cinchona trees. All records are from humid, shaded mid‑to‑high elevation forests where persistent fog or high rainfall keeps bark surfaces damp. The lichen behaves as an epiphyte, anchoring to bark indirectly via bryophyte mats rather than penetrating the wood itself.
