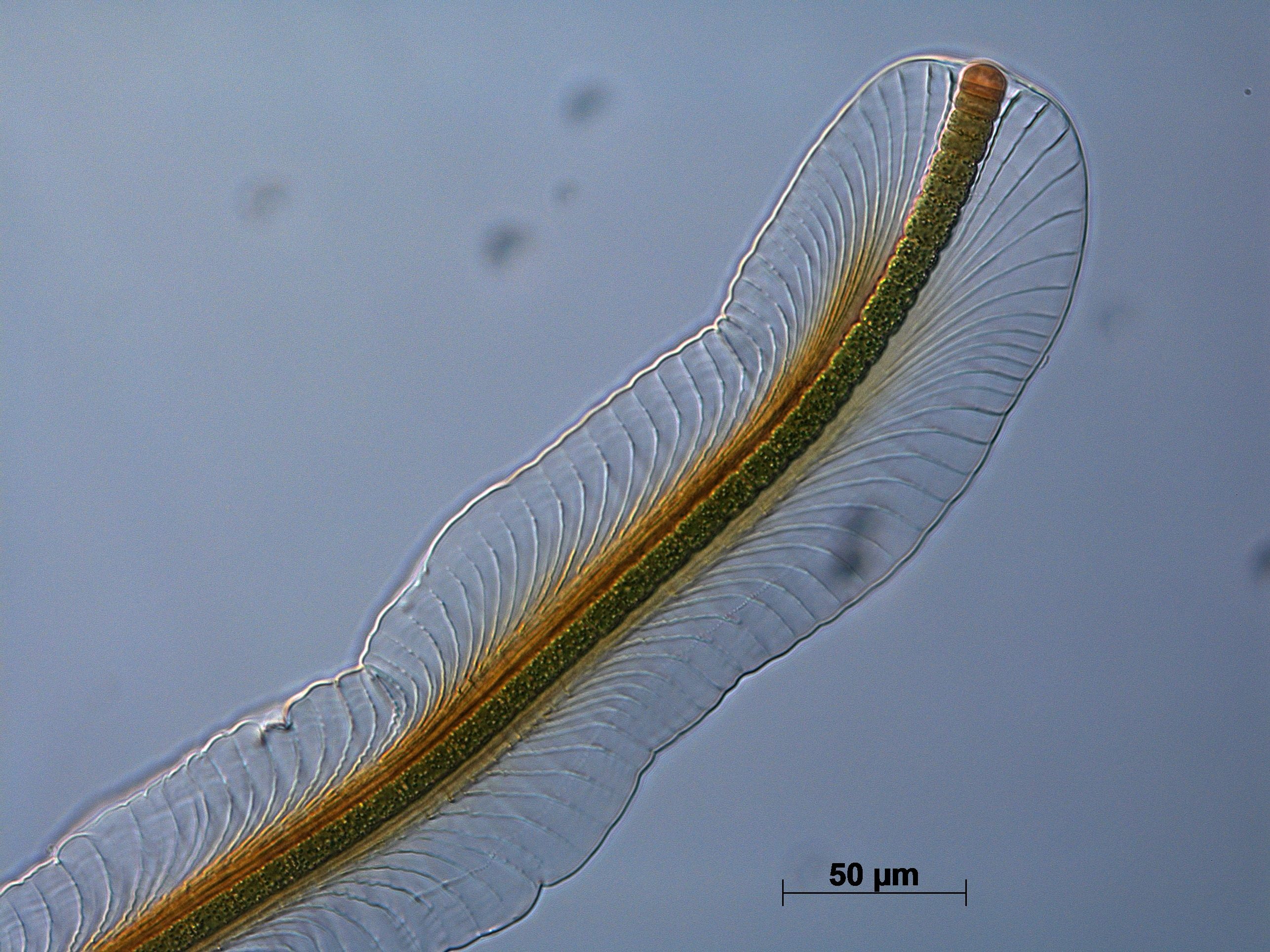
- Objective 40x

Scientific classification
- Domain: Bacteria
- Kingdom: Bacillati
- Phylum: Cyanobacteriota
- Class: Cyanophyceae
- Order: Nostocales
- Family: Scytonemataceae
- Genus: Petalonema
- Species: P. alatum

Binomial name
- Petalonema alatum Berkeley ex Kirchner

Synonyms
- Oscillatoria alata

= Petalonema alatum =

Species of bacterium

Petalonema alatum is a cyanobacterium. It was first described and drawn by the Scottish author Dugald Carmichael under the taxonomic name Oscillatoria allata in 1826. In 1833, Miles Joseph Berkeley re-published it under its current name Petalonema alatum. P. alatum produces a slime-like mucopolysaccharide in the form of interlocking slime funnels. The structure looks like a quill under the light microscope, which is where the species gets its name "alatum", meaning quill. These slime envelopes are up to 270 μm wide in diameter and are therefore visible by the naked eye as filiform formations ("nema" = floss). The habitats for this filamentous cyanobacterium are mainly wet limestone walls and create together with other bacteria, microalgae, bryophytes and micromycets gray or gray-brown biofilms. Populations of P. alatum have specialized cells - yellow heterocytes to bind atmospheric nitrogen which are in colour contrast to vegetative blue-green/turquoise cells in filamentous thallus.
