= Calothrix crustacea =

Scientific classification
- Domain: Bacteria
- Phylum: Cyanobacteria
- Class: Cyanophyceae
- Order: Nostocales
- Family: Rivulariaceae
- Genus: Calothrix
- Species: C. crustacea

Binomial name
- Calothrix crustacea Thuret ex Bornet & Flahault 1886

Species of bacterium

Calothrix crustacea is a species of cyanobacteria that is widespread in oceans worldwide.

== Anatomy ==
Unusually for bacteria, the filaments of this species have an elongated base and a pointed tip with transparent hair at the end. The filaments have coatings that are either firm or jelly-like, and they all are made up of concentric layers that are colored yellow or brown. The filament also grows like the root of a plant. Sometimes the filament sheds and can reproduce asexually by dropping fragments (hormogonia) off the stem.

== Habitats ==
This species of cyanobacteria frequently coat coastal rocks and seaweeds. This species may also form the photosynthetic part of certain rocky shore lichens, such as Lichina pygmaea.
