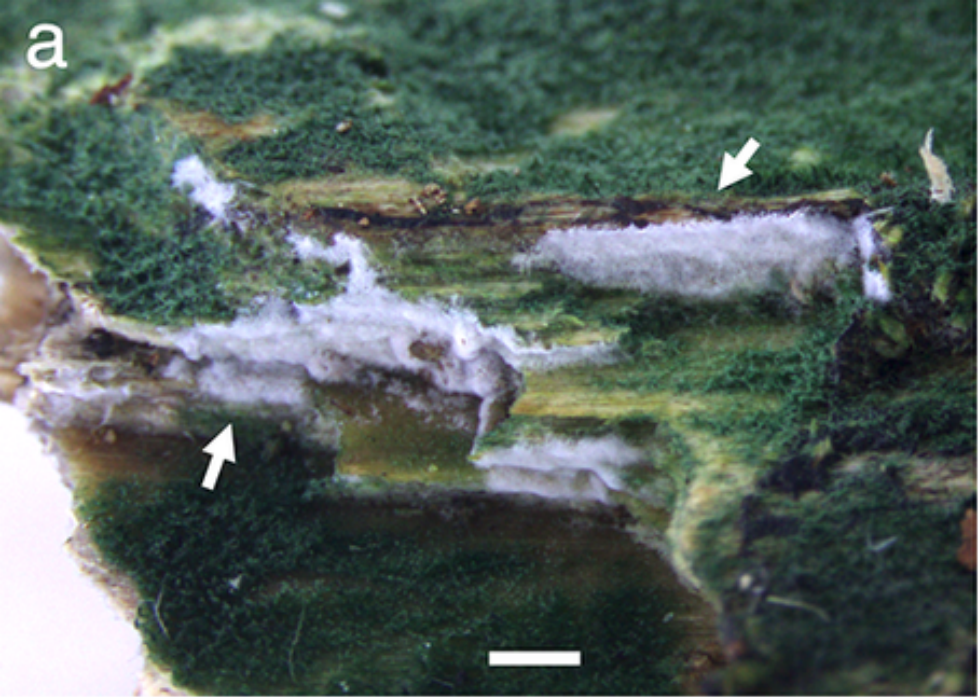
- Resupinate fruiting bodies (white arrows) and fibrous thallus

Scientific classification
- Kingdom: Fungi
- Division: Basidiomycota
- Class: Agaricomycetes
- Order: Agaricales
- Family: Hygrophoraceae
- Genus: Cyphellostereum
- Species: C. ushimanum

Binomial name
- Cyphellostereum ushimanum H.Masumoto & Y.Degawa (2022)

= Cyphellostereum ushimanum =

Species of lichen

Cyphellostereum ushimanum is a species of lichen-forming fungus in the family Hygrophoraceae. This basidiolichen was discovered and described in 2022 from a single location on Amami Ōshima island in Japan, where it grows on the bark of Japanese cedar trees. The species has microscopic feeding structures (haustoria) that penetrate its cyanobacterial partner, a feature that required an update to its genus, Cyphellostereum. The lichen produces small, white, paper-thin reproductive structures adjacent to its bluish-green thallus.

== Taxonomy ==
The species was formally introduced and described as Cyphellostereum ushima by Hiroshi Masumoto and Yousuke Degawa, who based the epithet on an indigenous pronunciation of the island name "Ōshima". Their morphological study, combined with internal transcribed spacer rDNA data, placed the fungus in a strongly supported clade within the genus Cyphellostereum, sister to C. unoquinoum and C. phyllogenum. Together these taxa share the absence of clamp connections and an incomplete hyphal sheath around the cyanobacterial trichomes, yet C. ushima alone have intracellular tubular haustoria.

The discovery required a slight revision of the generic concept. Classical Cyphellostereum species were thought to lack haustoria and to form stipitate, cup‑like fruiting bodies, whereas the new species demonstrates that resupinate basidiomata and haustorial penetration of the photobiont both fall within the phylogenetic limits of the genus. As a consequence, the authors emended the diagnosis of Cyphellostereum to encompass a broader range of thallus architectures and hymenophore morphologies.

== Description ==
Macroscopically, the lichenised thallus forms a fragile, green to bluish‑green mat of loosely interwoven fungal‑cyanobacterial fibrils on the bark of Cryptomeria japonica. In microscopic section the thallus is up to 80 micrometres (μm) thick, with occasional tufts of compact fibrils projecting to roughly 300 μm. Each Rhizonema filament (about 2.7–3.5 μm diam.) is only partly ensheathed by hyphae, leaving visible interspaces. Under the light microscope and in TEM micrographs, tubular haustoria (about 2.5–3.4 μm diam.) are seen entering the trichome and running through consecutive cells, a feature otherwise associated with the related genus Dictyonema.

The basidiomata develop on the wood surface adjacent to the thallus, especially along the margins or on the underside of overhanging bark. They are paper‑thin, membranous and white, rarely exceeding a few millimetres across. The hymenium is ≤ 40 μm thick and composed of hyaline, thin‑walled hyphae 3–4 μm wide; clamp connections and cystidia are absent. Basidia are short‑clavate, 8.6–13.0 × 5.4–6.5 μm, bearing four sterigmata 2.2–3.6 μm long. Basidiospores are ellipsoid to slightly elongate, 5.3–6.3 × 3.4–4.0 μm, smooth, thin‑walled and non‑amyloid. When grown axenically on potato dextrose agar at 20 °C the mycobiont forms slow‑growing, pale pink to pale brown colonies reaching 4.0–4.5 mm diameter after two months.

== Habitat and distribution ==
As of its original publication, Cyphellostereum ushima was known to occur only in the type locality, a low‑elevation (15 m) coastal forest in Setouchi town, Amami Ōshima, Kagoshima Prefecture. The climate there is warm and humid year‑round, supporting subtropical evergreen broad‑leaved vegetation in which Cryptomeria japonica plantations are common. The lichen grows epiphytically on the shaded, occasionally rain‑washed trunks and branches of this conifer, where mesic conditions favour cyanobacterial partners. Field observations indicate that the species is locally rare but may be overlooked because its inconspicuous thallus blends into algal films and bryophyte patches, while its basidiomata are minute and transient.
