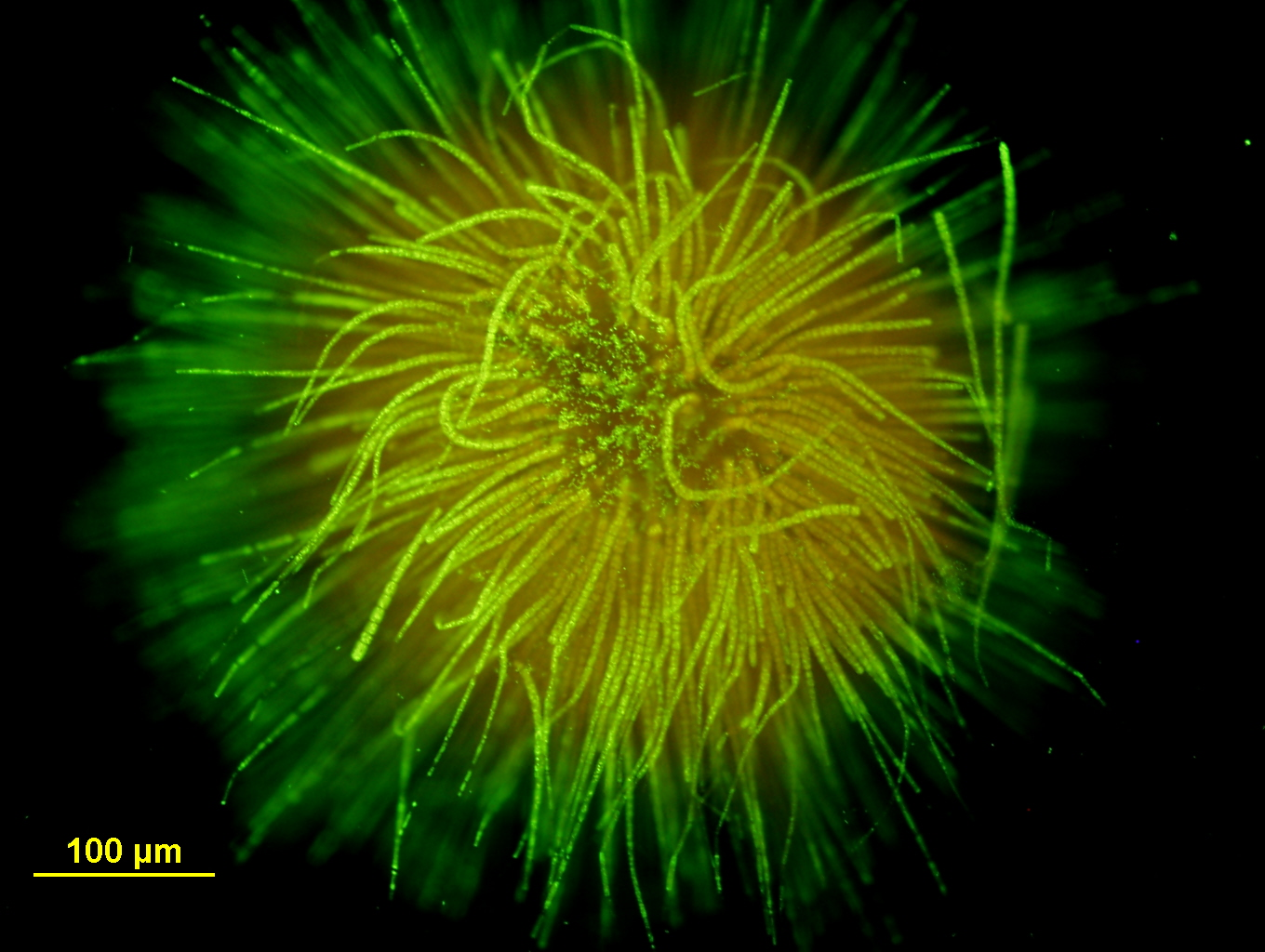
- Gloeotrichia echinulata stained with SYTOX

Scientific classification
- Domain: Bacteria
- Kingdom: Bacillati
- Phylum: Cyanobacteriota
- Class: Cyanophyceae
- Order: Nostocales
- Family: Gloeotrichiaceae
- Genus: Gloeotrichia; J.Agardh ex Bornet & Flahault, 1886

= Gloeotrichia =

Genus of bacteria

Gloeotrichia is a large (~2 mm) colonial genus of Cyanobacteria, belonging to the order Nostocales. The name Gloeotrichia is derived from the appearance of the filamentous body with prominent mucilage matrix. Found in lakes across the globe, gloeotrichia are notable for the important roles that they play in the nitrogen and phosphorus cycles. Gloeotrichia are also a genus of concern for lake managers, as they have been shown to push lakes towards eutrophication and to produce potentially deadly Microcystin-LR.

== Morphology ==
Spherical colonies of radiating straight trichomes (filaments without sheaths). Each trichome has an akinete as the basal cell near the center of the colony. Akinetes if present are adjacent the heterocyst. The primary morphology is trichomous (filamentous without sheaths), the secondary is colonial. The mucilaginous sheath is top short at the apex. Heterocysts are usually spherical in appearance. Trichomes are tapered at the apical region. Vegetetive cells are shorter and barrel shaped. The sheaths are firmly attached at the basal region. Sex organs are absent.

== Species ==
- Gloeotrichia echinulata
- Gloeotrichia intermedia
- Gloeotrichia natans
- Gloeotrichia pisum

== Similar genera ==
Rivularia is reported to form a morphologically similar colony when they are attached with the substratum and reported to radiating, tapered filaments with basal heterocysts.

== Habitat ==
Freshwater Cyanobacteria. In North America Gloeotrichia appears unexpectedly in many remote oligotrophic lakes during late summer and fall. It is also reported from several remote and pristine lakes in the undisturbed boreal forest watershed. Recently Gloeotrichia was also found in 26 of 27 ‘low nutrient’ lakes in New England USA (Carey et al. 2012).

Likely the colonies develop in the bottom waters where sediment mineralization releases a portion of its phosphate, then adjust their buoyancy with displacement of bacterioplasm by elongating gas vesicles and rise to the surface where they can be distributed horizontally by wind-driven water currents. Blooms form in mid to late summer due to this ‘recruitment’ from the sediments, as the benthic colonies rise relatively in synchrony, measured in inverted funnel traps at up to 104 colonies m-2 day-1 in Lake Sunapee, NH USA (Carey et al. 2014).

Evidence that Gloeotrichia is meroplanktonic, spending part or most of the year in sediments, comes from mesocosm growth experiments at Lake Erken. While open-water (pelagic) colonies were increasing during July 2000 – 2001, colonies in mesocosms (41 L and 300 L volume) were decreasing, even with additions of various combinations of nutrients (exception: addition of N, P and Fe) (Karlsson-Elfgren et al. 2005). The conclusion is that P-rich sediments enable colony growth and that increasing colony buoyancy during July brings them into the pelagic zone

Gloeotrichia is also reported from some remote nutrient rich lakes surrounded by paddy field in West Bengal of India. Though this newly found paper which states about the presence of them in Bengal is not widely verified.

== Phosphorus Cycling ==
Lakes have several sources of P, but a large source is found in the bottom sediments or benthos. The P in the benthos is generally found in organic matter or bound to metals, like iron. However, summer stratification in the water column keeps the P from circulating to the epilimnion, or upper layers.

Gloeotrichia have been linked to the phosphorus (P) cycle in lakes due to the fact that they transport P from the benthos to the epilimnion when they migrate. Over the winter Gloeotrichia forms dormant cells called akinetes that germinate and begin to form colonies when temperatures begin to increase. As these cells grow, they uptake nutrients like P. However, they generally uptake more nutrients than they need and store it for later use for when they migrate to the nutrient deplete epilimnion. The minimum cellular need for P in Gloeotrichia is approximately 2.3 g P/mg C, but actual uptake is 25-500e-6 g/L/day, compared to algae, which is normally 1-100e-6 g/L/day. Once Gloeotrichia have stored enough P to sustain colonial formation and growth, they begin to form vacuoles filled with gas to increase their buoyancy and bring them up to the epilimnion.

There, the extra nutrients allow for further colonial growth. Colonies generally form from late June through July. As Gloeotrichia migrate, the percentage of P in the epilimnion due to Gloeotrichia increases from 1% to 53%. In fact, the migration of gloeo causes a P flux of 2.25 mg/m^2*day. This increased amount of P allows Gloeotrichia to outcompete other algal species in a nutrient-deplete epilimnion.

== Nitrogen Fixation ==
Along with their role in the phosphorus cycle, Gloeotrichia also play an important role in lake nitrogen (N) cycling. Like many other cyanobacteria, Gloeotrichia have the nitrogenase enzyme, which allows them to convert N from its biologically unavailable form (dissolved N_{2} gas), into biologically available ammonia (NH_{3}). This N-fixation allows gloeotrichia to outcompete other phytoplankton and thrive in low-N environments. Cyanobacterial N-fixation also impacts overall phytoplankton community structure by increasing the pool of biologically available N within a lake. This increase often boosts phytoplankton production and favors taxa that do better in nutrient rich environments.

== Toxins ==
While research on toxin production of specific species of Gloeotrichia is limited, some species are potentially harmful. In Lake Sunapee, Gloeotrichia echinulata have been found to produce microcystin-LR, which could become a risk to the health of humans and aquatic ecosystems. Microcystins are a group of potent heptapeptide hepatotoxins, which contains more than 85 known varieties, produced by different species of aquatic cyanobacteria. Gloeotrichia echinulata are found in a variety of ecosystems, but tend to form large, potentially dangerous blooms in lakes with eutrophic and poor ecological status.
