= Gloeotrichiaceae =

Scientific classification
- Domain: Bacteria
- Kingdom: Bacillati
- Phylum: Cyanobacteriota
- Class: Cyanophyceae
- Order: Nostocales
- Family: Gloeotrichiaceae; Komárek et al. 2014

Genera
- Calothrix pro parte; Gloeotrichia J. Agardh ex Bornet et Flahault 1886

Family of bacteria

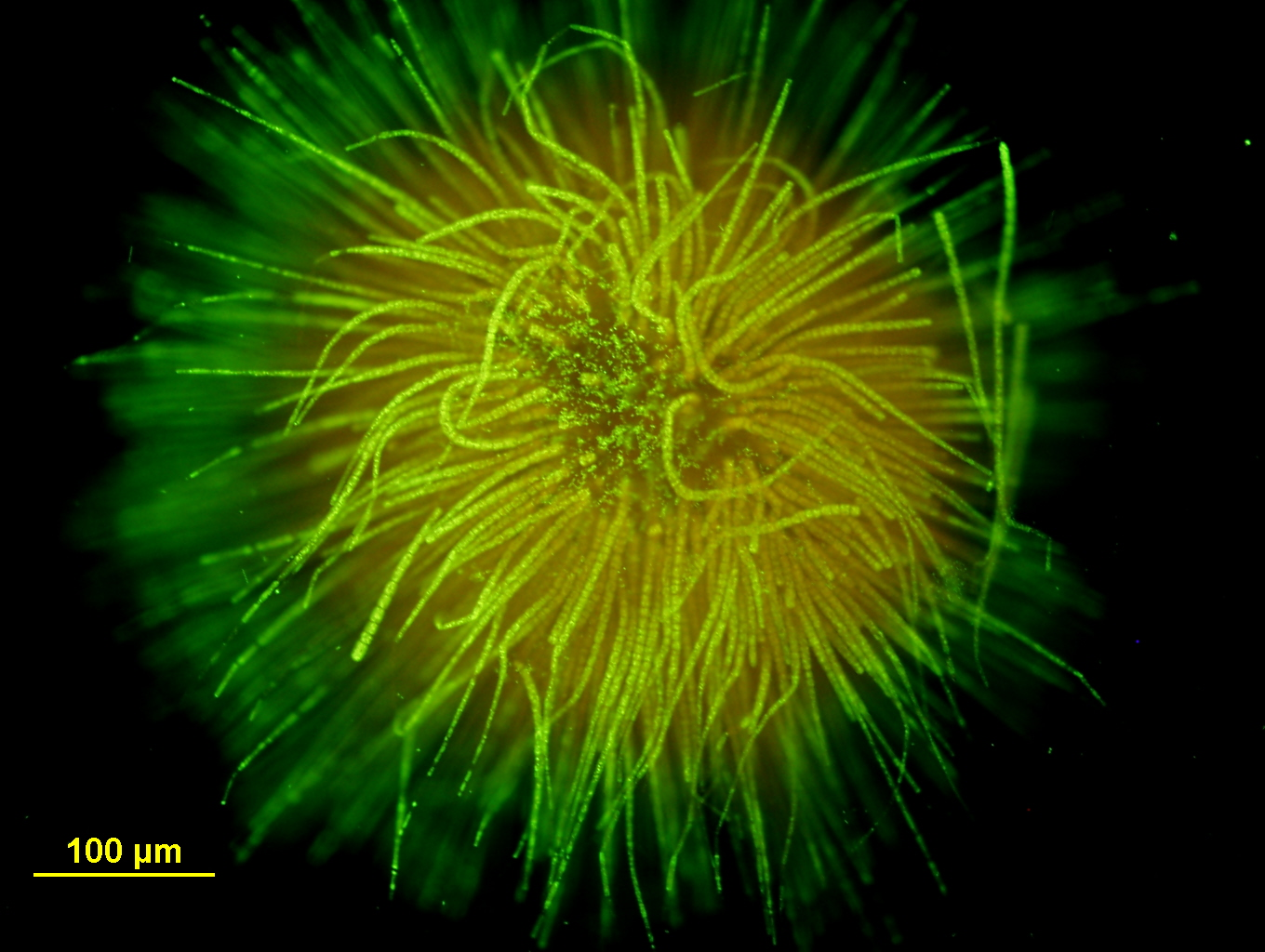

The Gloeotrichiaceae are a family of cyanobacteria.
