= Cyphellostereum galapagoense =

Scientific classification
- Kingdom: Fungi
- Division: Basidiomycota
- Class: Agaricomycetes
- Order: Agaricales
- Family: Hygrophoraceae
- Genus: Cyphellostereum
- Species: C. galapagoense

Binomial name
- Cyphellostereum galapagoense (Yánez, Dal-Forno & Bungartz) Dal-Forno, Bungartz & Lücking (2017)
- Holotype: San Cristóbal Island, Galápagos

Synonyms
- Dictyonema galapagoense Yánez, Dal-Forno & Bungartz (2012)

Species of lichen

Cyphellostereum galapagoense is a species of basidiolichen in the family Hygrophoraceae. The species is found only in the humid highlands of the Galápagos Islands, where it grows on moss-covered tree branches in misty cloud forests. It was originally classified under a different genus name in 2012 before DNA studies revealed its true evolutionary relationships. The lichen forms blue-green, hair-like strands that create a velvet-textured mat and partners with nitrogen-fixing bacteria to survive in nutrient-poor environments.

== Taxonomy ==
Cyphellostereum galapagoense is a basidiolichen, meaning its fungal partner lies in the basidiomycete family Hygrophoraceae rather than the more familiar ascomycetes. The species was first described in 2012 under the name Dictyonema galapagoense by Alba Yánez, Manuela Dal Forno and Frank Bungartz, based on a single San Cristóbal Island collection. That original placement reflected its thin, bluish‑green fibrils and the "jigsaw" fungal sheath typical of Dictyonema species. Subsequent DNA work showed the fungus groups firmly with Cyphellostereum, so Dal Forno, Bungartz and Robert Lücking transferred it in 2017, resolving the mismatch between morphology and ancestry.

The holotype specimen comes from a Psidium‑dominated forest on San Cristóbal, where it grew on mosses over a manchineel (Hippomane mancinella) branch. It differs from the related C. unoquinoum by having denser, more bluish fibrils and a completely enclosed cyanobacterial sheath. With all confirmed records coming from the archipelago, the taxon is treated as a Galápagos endemic.

== Description ==
The lichen forms a felt‑like patch of irregularly erect, hair‑fine fibrils that give the thallus (the visible body of a lichen) a blue‑green sheen. Fibrils are bundles of fungal‑wrapped cyanobacterial "threads", so a casual observer can picture them as tiny strands of braided fishing‑line. No distinct prothallus (a margin of fungus tissue) is present, and any hypothallus (a basal weave of hyphae) appears only as a faint white film. The photobiont is Rhizonema, a cyanobacterium whose 7–10 μm‑wide cells sit in single‑row filaments, each filament being tightly jacketed by 2.5–3.5 μm‑thick fungal hyphae with a jigsaw outline. Frequent pale‑yellow heterocysts—specialised nitrogen‑fixing cells—punctuate the filaments and reach the same size range as the ordinary cells.

These heterocysts supply nitrogen to the partnership, a useful service in rain‑washed tree‑canopies where other nutrients are scarce. Because the fibrils also grow vertically, the mat takes on a short "pile", recalling the nap of velvet or the fuzz on a peach. No hymenophore (fruiting body) has yet been observed, so reproduction is assumed to be mainly by dispersal of broken fibrils. Field collectors recognise the species by its finer, more erect filaments compared with Dictyonema look‑alikes, and by the absence of a white prothallus rim.

== Habitat and distribution ==
Confirmed specimens come from the humid highlands of San Cristóbal and Santa Cruz Islands, Galápagos. The type locality is a semi‑shaded manchineel forest at roughly 392 m elevation where constant mist keeps substrates damp. A second collection from 729 m on Santa Cruz was made in abandoned farmland behind El Puntudo, again within the cool, moisture‑laden "scalesia zone". Both sites share shelter from direct sun and abundant bryophyte cover, conditions that favour water‑absorbing filamentous lichens.

The lichen grows as an epiphyte on moss mats that coat tree branches, indicating a reliance on bryophytes for initial anchorage rather than on the woody substrate itself. Such bryophyte‑laden cloud forest fragments are also hotspots for other basidiolichens, which collectively prefer the archipelago's wetter upland microclimates. No mainland records exist, and molecular phylogenies show the Galápagos lineage to be distinct, supporting its status as an island endemic.
