= Cyphellostereum indicum =

Scientific classification
- Kingdom: Fungi
- Division: Basidiomycota
- Class: Agaricomycetes
- Order: Agaricales
- Family: Hygrophoraceae
- Genus: Cyphellostereum
- Species: C. indicum

Binomial name
- Cyphellostereum indicum S.Nayaka & A.Debnath (2023)

Species of lichen

Cyphellostereum indicum is a species of terricolous (ground-dwelling) basidiolichen in the family Hygrophoraceae. It forms small, white to cream, fan-shaped fruiting bodies on short stalks that grow from the soil surface. The species was discovered in Arunachal Pradesh in the eastern Himalayas and was described in 2023.

== Taxonomy ==
The species was described in 2023 by Sanjeeva Nayaka and Ambikesh Debnath from collections made in Arunachal Pradesh, a biodiversity‑rich state in the eastern Himalayas.

== Description ==
The lichen forms solitary, fan‑shaped (flabelliform) fruiting bodies (hymenophores) that are white to cream and borne on a short stalk. Each fan is only a few millimetres across and grows directly from the soil surface (a terricolous habit).

Microscopically, the fungal partner produces club‑shaped basidia measuring 16.7–20.1 × 2.5–5.5 μm and very small, smooth, thin‑walled basidiospores that are irregular to "pip‑shaped", measuring 3.18–4.9 × 2.06–2.9 μm. The photosynthetic partner (photobiont) is from the filamentous cyanobacterium genus Rhizonema, whose threads are 6–8 × 5.1–6.9 μm. Fungal hyphae loosely envelope each filament rather than forming a tight sheath, and they develop superficial haustoria (minute projections used to draw nutrients from the cyanobacterium). As in many others in the genus, clamp connections are absent.
