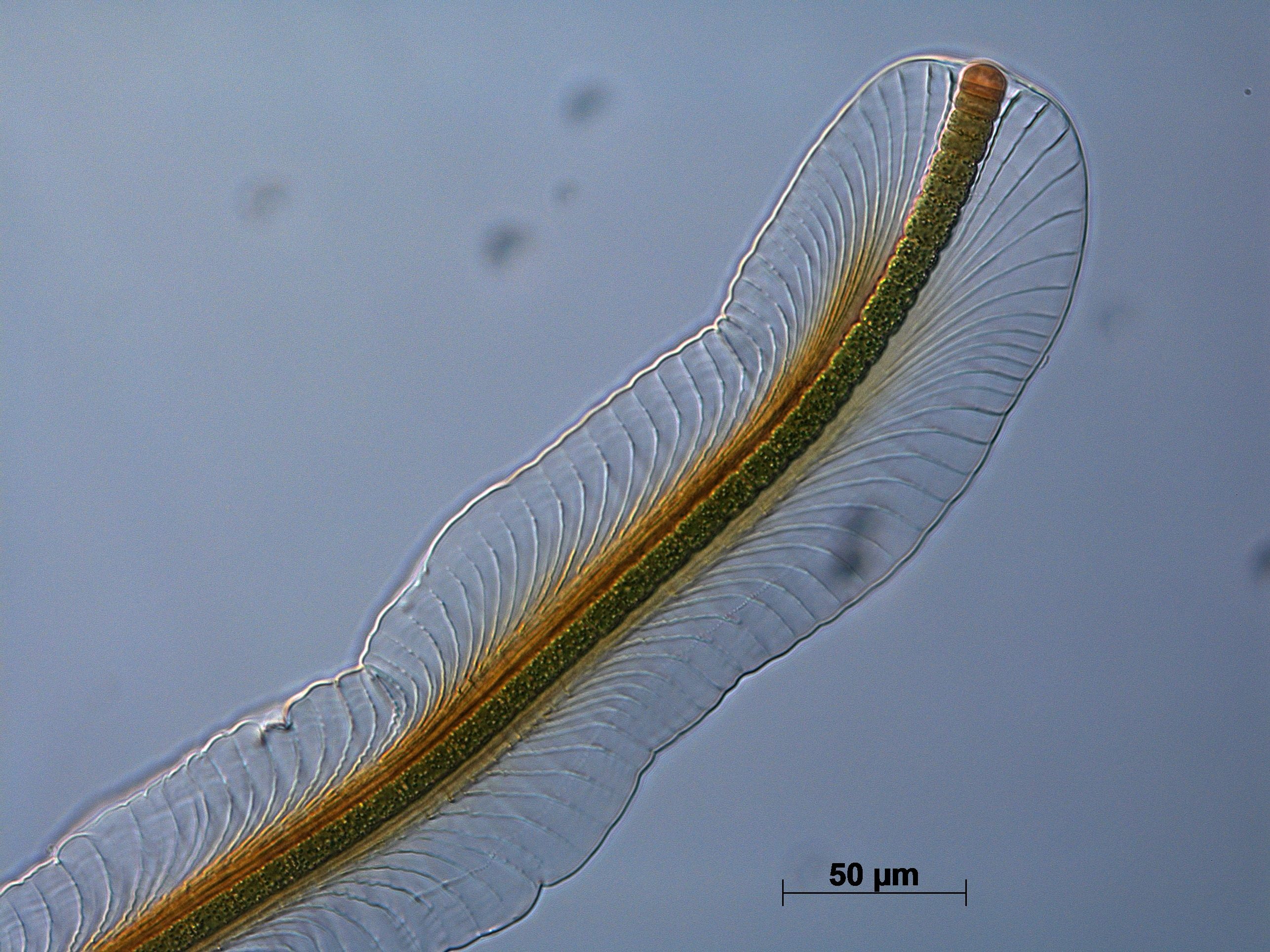
- Petalonema alatum

Scientific classification
- Domain: Bacteria
- Kingdom: Bacillati
- Phylum: Cyanobacteriota
- Class: Cyanophyceae
- Order: Nostocales
- Family: Scytonemataceae
- Genus: Petalonema; Berkeley ex Kirchner, 1898

Species
- see text

= Petalonema =

Genus of bacteria

Petalonema is a genus of cyanobacteria. These species occur in freshwater habitats, on rocks, in soil, and as epiphytes.

Species include:

- Petalonema alatum
- Petalonema crassum
- Petalonema crustaceum
- Petalonema densum
- Petalonema fluminalis
- Petalonema incrustans
- Petalonema involvens
- Petalonema pulchrum
- Petalonema velutinum
