= Loefgrenia =

Loefgrenia may refer to:

- Loefgrenia (cyanobacteria) Gomont in Wittrock et al., 1896, a genus of cynobacteria
- Loefgrenia (trematode) Travassos, 1920, a genus of trematodes, see Telorchiidae
