= Cyphellostereum georgianum =

Scientific classification
- Kingdom: Fungi
- Division: Basidiomycota
- Class: Agaricomycetes
- Order: Agaricales
- Family: Hygrophoraceae
- Genus: Cyphellostereum
- Species: C. georgianum

Binomial name
- Cyphellostereum georgianum Dal-Forno, McMullin & Lücking (2019)
- Holotype: Harper Lake Park, Georgia, USA

Species of lichen-forming fungus

Cyphellostereum georgianum is a corticioid basidiolichen first described in 2019 from the coastal plain of Georgia, USA. A member of the family Hygrophoraceae, it sits within the Dictyonema clade, a group of lichens that partner a basidiomycete fungus with filamentous cyanobacteria. Its closest relative is the South‑Carolinian C. jamesianum, but the two differ markedly in thallus texture and color.

== Taxonomy ==
The species was formally named and described by Manuela Dal Forno, R. Troy McMullin, and Robert Lücking. The holotype was collected on March 29, 2013 in Harper Lake Park (McIntosh County, Georgia) where it formed a mat on the trunk of a deciduous tree at 25 m elevation. Molecular data (ITS rDNA) place C. georgianum in a well‑supported lineage inside the genus Cyphellostereum and sister to C. jamesianum. The genus itself is nested in tribe Arrheniae of Hygrophoraceae, a lineage otherwise dominated by non‑lichenised agarics.

== Description ==
The lichen produces a crustose‑filamentous thallus: a thin, firmly attached crust made of countless intertwined cyanobacterial‑fungal threads. At its base the thallus forms a continuous dark‑green carpet; above this are irregular, slightly raised patches where the threads are packed more densely, giving a yellow‑green tinge.

Under the microscope each thread (called a fibril) consists of a chain of cyanobacterial cells 7–12.5 μm wide sheathed by branched fungal hyphae. Occasional pale‑yellow heterocytes—specialised nitrogen‑fixing cells—punctuate the filaments. Clamp connections on the fungal hyphae confirm its basidiomycete identity.

Reproduction occurs on the underside of the lichen where tiny, white, crust‑like pads (the hymenophores) develop. These corticioid basidiocarps can reach 14 mm long but remain only about 2 mm across. In section the fertile layer is up to 100 μm thick and built of 2–4 μm hyphae; immature club‑shaped structures (basidioles) measure 3–4 × 12–18 μm. Mature basidia and basidiospores have not yet been observed.

Microscopically, C. georgianum builds a dark‑green crust of densely tangled fibrils that rise into thick, mound‑like patches, whereas its sister species C. jamesianum spreads as a much looser layer of individual to only slightly interwoven fibrils. C. jamesianum is also thinner and more bluish, with clearly separated, sometimes yellow‑tinged fibrils, and it lacks the elevated patches that give C. georgianum its mottled texture.

== Habitat and distribution ==
As of its original publication, Cyphellostereum georgianum is known only from the type locality in Harper Lake Park, Georgia, where it grows on the bark of live hardwoods such as oaks within a low‑lying pine–oak woodland. The surrounding canopy is dominated by Pinus taeda with a mixed mid‑storey of Quercus hemisphaerica, Q. geminata, Ilex opaca and other broad‑leaved species; shrubs include saw palmetto and various blueberries. The lichen overgrows bark and adjacent bryophyte mats in humid, shaded microhabitats but has not been recorded outside this site.
