= Capsosiraceae =

Scientific classification
- Domain: Bacteria
- Phylum: Cyanobacteria
- Class: Cyanophyceae
- Order: Nostocales
- Family: Capsosiraceae (Geitler) Elenkin

Genera
- Capsosira Kützing ex Bornet & Flahault 1887; Desmosiphon Borzì 1907; Nematoplaca Geitler 1933; Stauromatonema Frémy 1930

Family of bacteria

The Capsosiraceae are a family of cyanobacteria.
