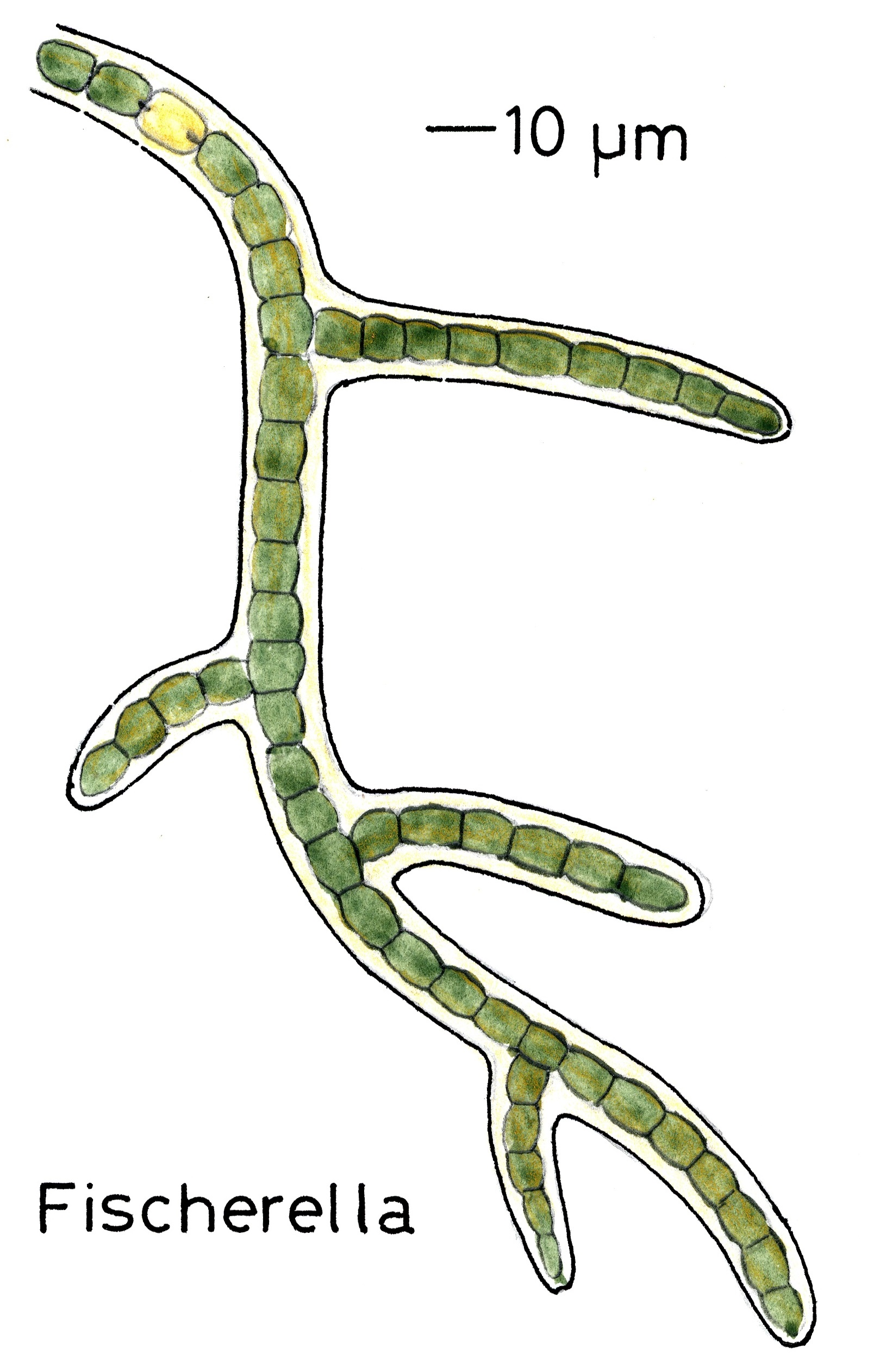

Scientific classification
- Domain: Bacteria
- Kingdom: Bacillati
- Clade: "Cyanobacteria/Melainabacteria clade"
- Phylum: Cyanobacteria
- Class: Cyanophyceae
- Order: Nostocales
- Family: Hapalosiphonaceae
- Genus: Fischerella (Bornet & Flahault) Gomont

= Fischerella =

Genus of cyanobacteria

Fischerella is a genus of cyanobacteria belonging to the family Hapalosiphonaceae.

The genus was first described by M. Gomont in 1895.

The genus has cosmopolitan distribution.

The genus name of Deightoniella is in honour of Christian Fischer (1801–1892), who was a Bohemian scientist and industrialist from Karlsbad (Baden).

The genus was circumscribed by Jean-Baptiste Édouard Bornet and Charles Henri Marie Flahault in J. Bot. (Morot) Vol.9 on pages 51-52 in 1895.

Known species:

- Fischerella major
- Fischerella muscicola
