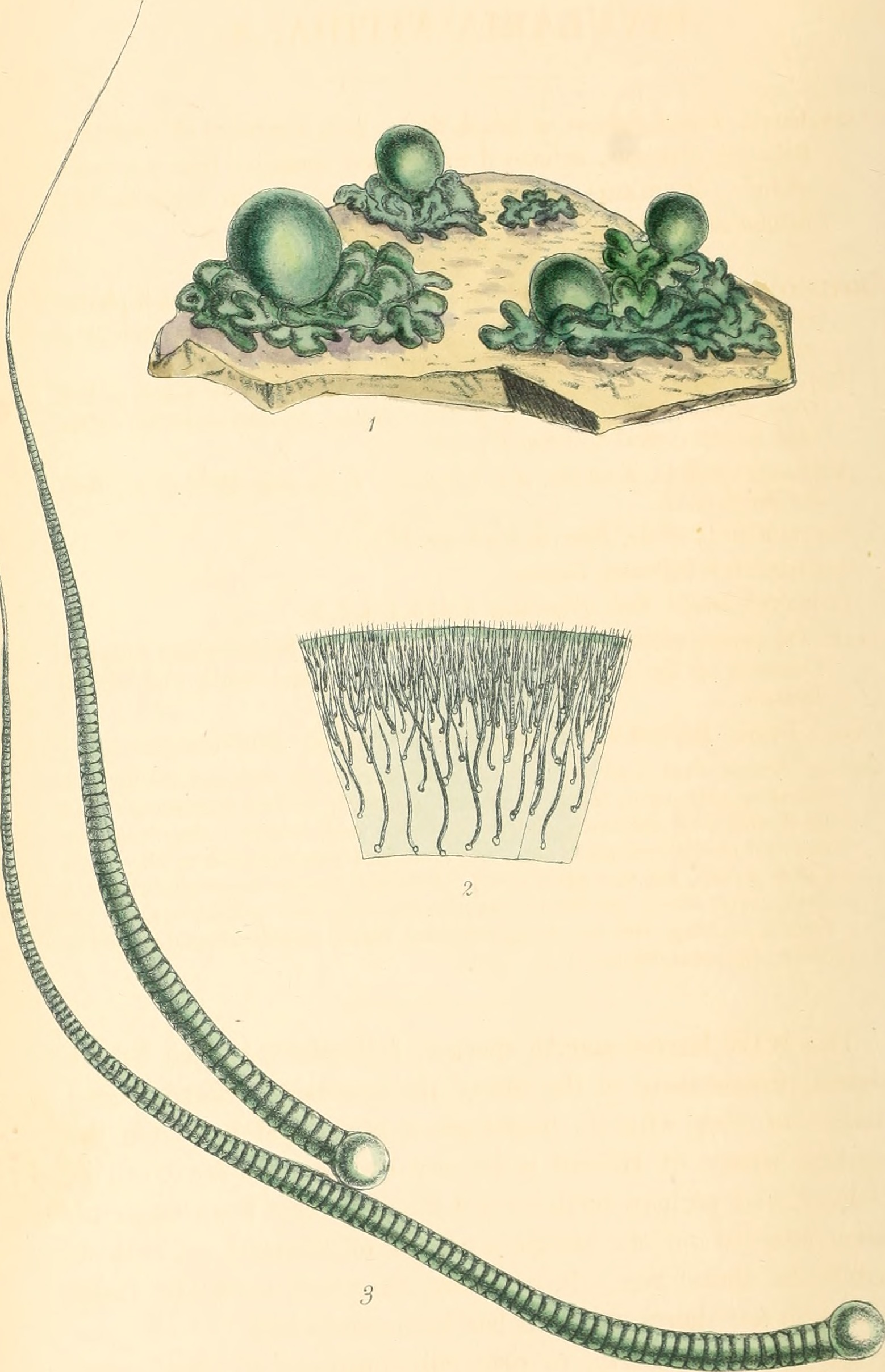
- Rivularia nitida

Scientific classification
- Domain: Bacteria
- Kingdom: Bacillati
- Phylum: Cyanobacteria
- Class: Cyanophyceae
- Order: Nostocales
- Family: Rivulariaceae
- Genus: Rivularia; C. Agardh, 1886

Type species
- R. dura C. Agardh, 1886

= Rivularia (cyanobacteria) =

Genus of bacteria

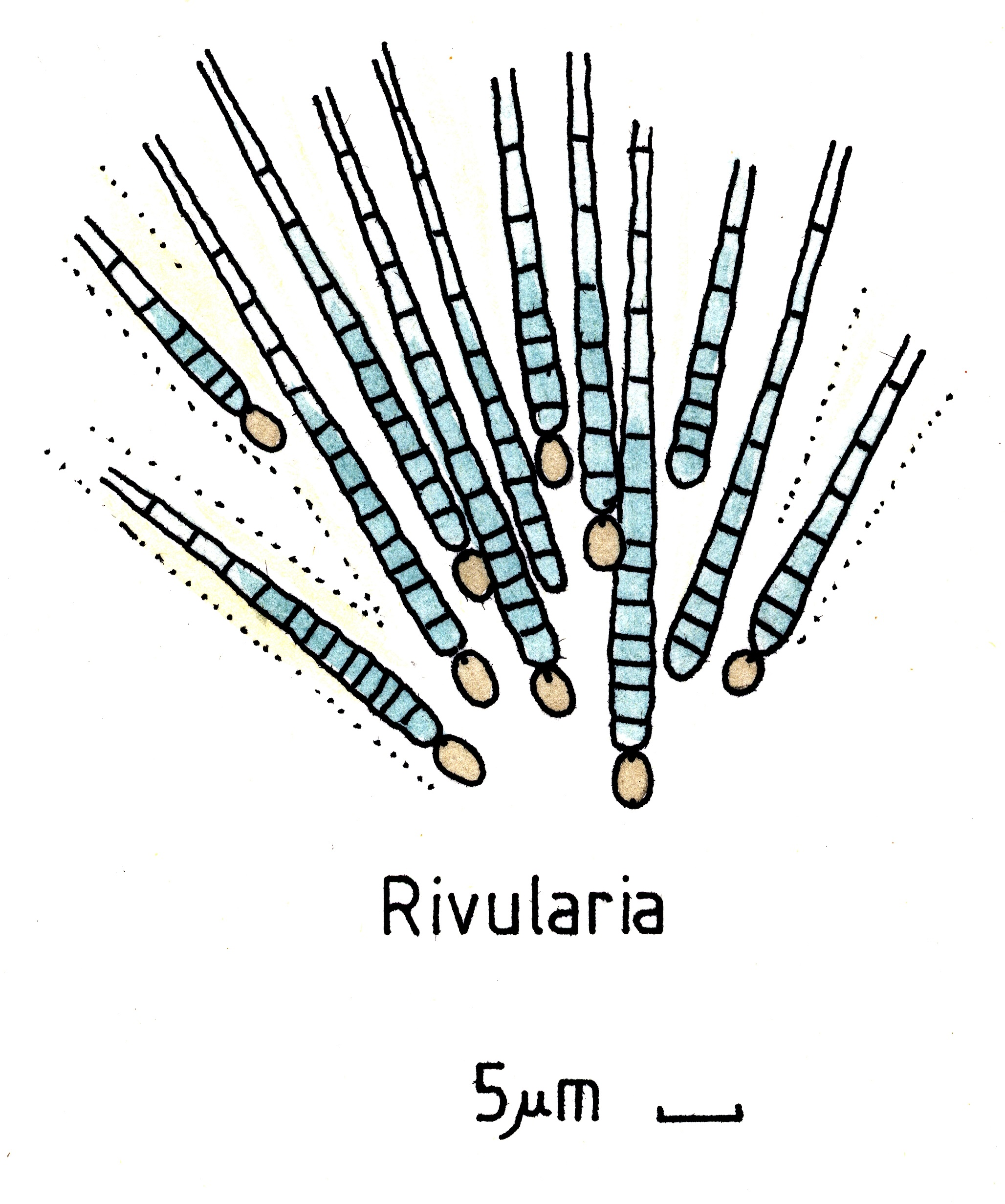
Rivularia, a genus of cyanobacteria associated with tufa

Rivularia is a genus of cyanobacteria of the family Rivulariaceae.

== Description ==
Rivularia is found growing on submerged stones, moist rocks, and damp soils near the riverside. It is found in colonies, and the trichomes are radially arranged within a colony, with each trichome wholly or partially surrounded by a gelatinous sheet. The trichomes have a basal heterocyst. Each trichome has a narrow aptic portion which is whip- or tail-like consisting of a row of small cells. Akinetes are absent in Rivularia. The species multiply with the aid of hormogonia and heterocyst.

== Species ==
- Rivularia atra Roth ex Bornet & Flahault, 1886
- Rivularia bullata (Poir) Berkeley ex Bornet & Flahault, 1886
- Rivularia haematites (De Candolle) Bornet & Flahault, 1886
- Rivularia jaoi H.-J.Chu, 1952
- Rivularia nitida C.Agardh ex Bornet & Flahault, 1886
- Rivularia thermalis Y.-Y.Li, 1984

Species brought into synonymy

- Rivularia cornudamae Roth, 1797: synonym of Chaetophora lobata Schrank, 1783
- Rivularia elegans Roth, 1802: synonym of Chaetophora elegans (Roth) C.Agardh, 1812
- Rivularia endiviaefolia Roth, 1798: synonym of Chaetophora lobata Schrank, 1783
- Rivularia lloydii P.Crouan & H.Crouan, 1867: synonym of Brachytrichia lloydii (P.Crouan & H.Crouan) P.C.Silva, 1996
- Rivularia multifida Weber & Mohr, 1804: synonym of Nemalion multifidum (F.Weber & D.Mohr) Chauvin, 1842
- Rivularia plana Harvey, 1833: synonym of Isactis plana (Harvey) Thuret ex Bornet & Flahault, 1886
- Rivularia rubra (Hudson) Wahlenberg, 1826: synonym of Nemalion helminthoides (Velley) Batters, 1902
- Rivularia tuberiformis Smith, 1809: synonym of Leathesia marina (Lyngbye) Decaisne, 1842
- Rivularia vermiculata Smith, 1808: synonym of Mesogloia vermiculata (Smith) S.F.Gray, 1821
- Rivularia zosterae Mohr, 1810: synonym of Eudesme virescens (Carmichael ex Berkeley) J.Agardh, 1882
