= Loefgrenia anomala =

Scientific classification
- Domain: Bacteria
- Phylum: Cyanobacteria
- Class: Cyanophyceae
- Order: Nostocales
- Family: Hapalosiphonaceae
- Genus: Loefgrenia; Gomont in Wittrock et al., 1896
- Species: L. anomala

Binomial name
- Loefgrenia anomala Gomont, 1896

Species of bacterium

Loefgrenia is a monospecific, freshwater, epiphytic genus of nonheterocystic cyanobacteria known from Brazil.

The type and only known species for the genus is Loefgrenia anomala.

The genus name of Loefgrenia is in honour of Johan Albert Constantin Löfgren (1854–1918), known as Albert Löfgren or Alberto Löfgren, was head of the botany department of the Rio de Janeiro Botanical Garden around 1905.

The genus was circumscribed by Maurice Augustin Gomont in Alg. Aq. Dulc. Exsicc. on page 1350 in 1896.
