= Dictyonema coppinsii =

Scientific classification
- Kingdom: Fungi
- Division: Basidiomycota
- Class: Agaricomycetes
- Order: Agaricales
- Family: Hygrophoraceae
- Genus: Dictyonema
- Species: D. coppinsii

Binomial name
- Dictyonema coppinsii Lücking, Barrie & Genney (2014)

Synonyms
- Dictyonema interruptum (Carmich. ex Hook.) Parmasto (1978) nom. inval.

Species of lichen

Dictyonema coppinsii is a filamentous, blue‑green basidiolichen in the family Hygrophoraceae. It forms thin, felt-like mats of tangled filaments that grow over mosses on bark, rocks, and soil in persistently humid conditions. The species is found along the western edge of Europe, including Scotland, Ireland, and Atlantic islands, with a possible occurrence in Mauritius. Originally misidentified under an invalid name, it was properly described in 2014 when researchers discovered it was distinct from its tropical relatives.

== Taxonomy ==
The lichen was long quoted in field guides as Dictyonema interruptum, but that binomial was illegitimate under nomenclatural rules because the epithet, interruptum, had already been used for a different organism—a cyanobacterium described in 1833. Since the same epithet cannot be used for different species within related groups, the later lichen name was invalid. Robert Lücking, Fred Barrie and David Genney therefore introduced the replacement name D. coppinsii in 2014 and simultaneously validated the cyanobacterial photobiont under the genus Rhizonema as R. interruptum.

Molecular data place D. coppinsii close to the tropical complex around D. schenkianum, yet it can be told apart by its scattered clamp connections—minute cross‑walls that help the fungal threads distribute nuclei evenly—an anatomical feature absent from its tropical relative. Its photobiont belongs to the newly erected family Rhizonemataceae, reinforcing that this lichen partners with a cyanobacterium that is evolutionarily distinct from the more familiar Scytonema species.

== Description ==
The thallus (the lichen body) is an appressed mat of tangled, slightly upright filaments that encrust mossy bark, soil or rock. Each filament is only a few hundredths of a millimetre thick yet may stand up to 5 mm high, giving populations a miniature, felt‑like appearance. The photobiont cells (15–20 μm wide, 5–10 μm tall) are packed inside a thin, colourless sheath formed by "jigsaw‑puzzle" fungal cells. Scattered yellow heterocysts—specialised, nitrogen‑fixing cells—pepper the cyanobacterial strands, allowing the lichen to live on nutrient‑poor substrates.

Free fungal hyphae, 4–6 μm across and moderately thick‑walled, weave among the cyanobacterial threads. Most carry clamp connections that resemble tiny buckles under the microscope; while scarce in this species, their presence is diagnostic in Europe. When the lichen fruits, it produces sparse, whitish basidiomata—corticioid, blister‑like cushions that break through the underside of the thallus. Each fruiting body bears cylindrical four‑spored basidia (10–20 × 5–7 μm) topped with curved sterigmata, and teardrop‑shaped basidiospores measuring 6–8 × 3–4 μm.

To the naked eye the lichen looks like a thin, bluish‑green carpet that turns grey‑green when dry; no contrasting prothallus (margin) is visible. The felted surface readily traps moisture, and the photobiont's pigments shift from deep blue‑green in shade to yellow‑green on exposed tips—an adaptation thought to shield the cells from excess ultraviolet light.

== Habitat and distribution ==
Dictyonema coppinsii prefers persistently humid, oceanic microclimates. It grows on moss‑covered bark, shaded rocks and peaty soils, frequently overgrowing bryophytes in old-growth ravines and Atlantic woodlands. Although the genus Dictyonema is mainly tropical, this species hugs the western fringe of Europe: confirmed sites include the Scottish Highlands, western Ireland, the Pyrenees, Madeira and the Azores, all of which experience year‑round mist and mild temperatures. A morphologically identical collection from moss-covered bark on Mont des Créoles, Mauritius shows that the lichen also inhabits humid montane forest in the south-west Indian Ocean, although molecular data are still needed to confirm conspecificity with European populations.

Field observations suggest that the lichen is scarce, patchy and slow‑growing, limited by its requirement for clean, constantly wet air. Most known populations occur inside protected areas, yet the fragmented nature of Atlantic Forests leaves it vulnerable to forestry, drainage and climate shifts that reduce ambient humidity. The photobiont appears to be as range‑restricted as the fungus; so far the same Rhizonema lineage has not been recovered from tropical relatives, suggesting at a tightly co‑evolved partnership.
