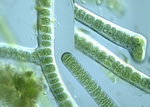
- Stigonema species

Scientific classification
- Domain: Bacteria
- Kingdom: Bacillati
- Phylum: Cyanobacteriota
- Class: Cyanophyceae
- Order: Nostocales
- Family: Stigonemataceae
- Genus: Stigonema; C.Agardh ex Bornet & Flahault, 1886

Type species
- Stigonema mamillosum C.Agardh ex Bornet & Flahault, 1886

Species
- See text

= Stigonema =

Genus of cyanobacteria

Stigonema is a genus of cyanobacteria in the family Stigonemataceae. Established in 1824 and formally defined in 1886, this genus contains 68 species of filament-forming cyanobacteria that create visible mats or crusts. The organisms are distinguished by their true branching pattern, where side-branches arise from cells along the main filament, and by filaments that are typically several cells thick. Some species also serve as the photosynthetic partner (photobiont) in certain lichens, embedded within fungal tissue.

== Taxonomy ==
Stigonema was established in 1824 by Carl Adolph Agardh in his Systema Algarum, to accommodate filamentous cyanobacteria that did not fit comfortably into earlier broad algal genera such as Conferva, Scytonema, Bangia, Sirosiphon, Hassallia, and Hapalosiphon. In their monographic revision of heterocystous "Nostocaceae" published in 1886, Édouard Bornet and Charles Flahault re-examined Agardh's concept of the genus and provided a more detailed circumscription. They characterised Stigonema as forming free or only loosely aggregated filaments that do not fuse into a definite frond, with the longer filament segments built from several cells across, and heterocytes (specialised nitrogen-fixing cells) most often positioned on the sides of the filaments. They also noted that species of the genus were mainly rigid, dark, terrestrial forms, or softer cushion-like growths in aquatic habitats.

Bornet and Flahault devoted considerable attention to the way Stigonema produces hormogonia, the short filament fragments that act as dispersal units, and to the resting cells observed in older filaments. They showed that several taxa described by earlier authors as independent "algae" in Sirosiphon or Stigonema were actually lichen thalli in which a Stigonema photobiont is embedded in fungal tissue; these lichenised forms, they argued, should be excluded from algal taxonomy. Following work by Antonino Borzì, they further divided Stigonema into two subgenera based on the contrast between the side branches and the main filament. The first of these, which they named Fischerella, was regarded as morphologically intermediate between Hapalosiphon and typical Stigonema, with a more complex main filament and a distinctive arrangement of heterocytes.

== Description ==
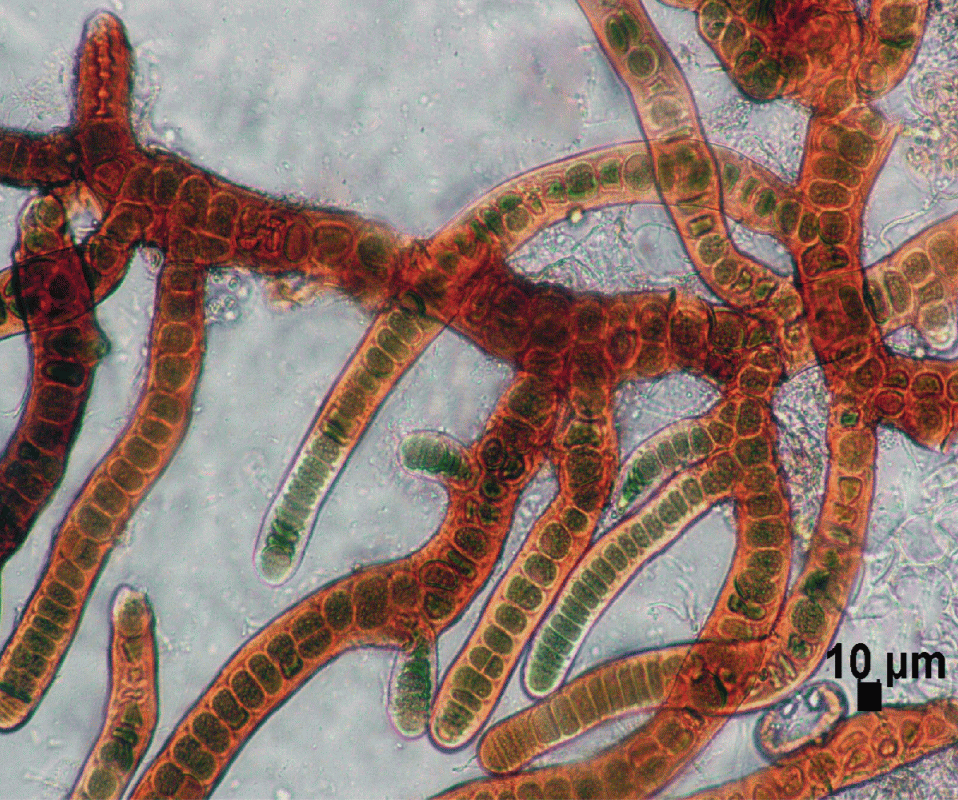
Stigonema minutum, isolated from mountain tundra. Scale bar = 10 μm

The genus Stigonema consists of filament-forming cyanobacteria that grow as mats or crusts on their substrate. The visible body (thallus) can look woolly or crusty and is made up of microscopic, often coiled filaments that are usually attached rather than freely floating. These filaments show "true" branching, meaning that side-branches arise from ordinary cells in the filament rather than simply from broken fragments. The filaments are not clearly divided into a thicker basal part and more delicate branches; instead, the branching network is fairly uniform.

Within each filament, the cells are arranged in trichomes – rows or bands of cells – that are usually two or more cells thick, although very young parts and the tips of branches may narrow to a single row of cells. The trichomes can be quite thick and are often irregularly coiled, with side-branches forming in a T- or V-shaped pattern. Towards the filament tips the number of cell rows often decreases, and the end cell (the apical cell) may be slightly larger than the cells behind it. The trichomes are surrounded by a sheath that may be thin or thick; this sheath tends to widen with age, develops a layered (lamellated) appearance, and commonly becomes yellowish-brown. In older parts of the filaments, additional envelopes may form around the cells, and the trichomes can break up internally into separate cells.

The individual cells are usually barrel-shaped or irregularly rounded. Adjacent cells are typically linked by a single small pore ("pit connection"), although these connections can be absent in some parts of the trichome. The cell contents are blue-green to olive-green and usually contain prominent single granules. Specialised nitrogen-fixing cells (heterocytes) occur singly within the trichome, most often inserted between ordinary cells (intercalary) and only rarely on the sides; they are similar in general shape to the neighbouring vegetative cells. Thick-walled resting spores (akinetes), which occur in some other cyanobacteria, are not known in Stigonema. In some cases, the filaments can give rise to small clusters of rounded, coccoid cells that resemble simple, non-filamentous cyanobacteria.

The cells of Stigonema are able to divide in all directions, but cross-wall formation across the length of the filament is the most common mode of division in the trichomes. Localised regions of active cell division (meristematic zones) are found only in parts of the filament where short reproductive fragments, called hormogonia, are produced. These hormogonia form at the ends of trichomes and branches and detach from the parent filament. They differ in shape from the main trichomes, being more cylindrical and composed of a single row of cells. Each hormogonium usually contains two or more cells, and in some cases may be many-celled; these fragments serve as the main means of dispersal and multiplication for the genus.

== Species ==
As of November 2025, 68 species of Stigonema are accepted in the Catalogue of Life.

- Stigonema acroheterocystum H.X.Xiao
- Stigonema aerugineum Tilden
- Stigonema alpinum O.Kirchner
- Stigonema anomalum F.N.Blanchard
- Stigonema atrovirens (Dillwyn) C.Agardh
- Stigonema boliviense Bornet & Flahault
- Stigonema canadensis W.R.Taylor
- Stigonema changbaiense H.X.Xiao
- Stigonema clavigerum Beck
- Stigonema congestum N.L.Gardner
- Stigonema contortum N.L.Gardner
- Stigonema cornutum N.L.Gardner
- Stigonema corticola S.C.Santra
- Stigonema crassivaginatum (Geltler) Sant'Anna, Kastovský, Hentschke & Komárek
- Stigonema dendroideum Frémy
- Stigonema dinghuense G.-F.Song & R.-H.Li
- Stigonema elegans N.L.Gardner
- Stigonema expansum Y.M.Lin & H.X.Xiao
- Stigonema flexuosum West & G.S.West
- Stigonema formosum Y.M.Lin & H.X.Xiao
- Stigonema fragile Y.M.Lin & H.X.Xiao
- Stigonema fremyi Sant'Anna, Kastovský, Hentschke & Komárek
- Stigonema gardneri G.De Toni
- Stigonema gelatinosum W.-J.Zhu
- Stigonema glaziovii Hennings & Hieronymus
- Stigonema gracile S.M.F.Silva & Sant'Anna
- Stigonema hainanensis W.-J.Zhu
- Stigonema hormoides Bornet & Flahault
- Stigonema informe Kützing ex Bornet & Flahault
- Stigonema intermedium N.V.Kondrateva
- Stigonema jureiense Hentschke & Sant'Anna
- Stigonema lauterbachii Schmidle
- Stigonema lavardei Frémy
- Stigonema lechangense W.-J.Zhu
- Stigonema leprieurii Montagne ex Bornet & Flahault
- Stigonema lichenoides Patova, Novakovskaya, Shalygin & Shadrin
- Stigonema mamillosum C.Agardh ex Bornet & Flahault
- Stigonema medium F.N.Blanchard
- Stigonema mesentericum Geitler
- Stigonema minutissimum A.Borzì
- Stigonema minutum Hassall ex Bornet & Flahault
- Stigonema mirabile Beck
- Stigonema multipartitum N.L.Gardner
- Stigonema muscicola A. Borzì ex Bornet & Flahault
- Stigonema nanxiongense W.-J.Zhu
- Stigonema ocellatum Thuret ex Bornet & Flahault
- Stigonema opalescens N.L.Gardner
- Stigonema panniforme Bornet & Flahault
- Stigonema parallelum Sant'Anna, Kastovský, Hentschke & Komárek
- Stigonema parciramosum N.L.Gardner
- Stigonema pauciramosum N.L.Gardner
- Stigonema pseudominutum Claassen
- Stigonema ramosissimum N.L.Gardner
- Stigonema robustum N.L.Gardner
- Stigonema rosenvingii Böcher
- Stigonema scrotiforme H.X.Xiao
- Stigonema scytonematoides N.L.Gardner
- Stigonema sinuatum Y.M.Lin & H.X.Xiao
- Stigonema spectabile Geitler
- Stigonema spiniferum N.L.Gardner
- Stigonema spinuliferum N.L.Gardner
- Stigonema subsalsum Klugh
- Stigonema tagorum Sudipta K.Das, Keshari & Adhikary
- Stigonema thermale A.Borzì ex Bornet & Flahault
- Stigonema tomentosum Hieronymus
- Stigonema tuberculatum N.L.Gardner
- Stigonema turfaceum Cooke ex Bornet & Flahault
- Stigonema vermiculatum Beck
