= Cyphellostereum brasiliense =

Scientific classification
- Domain: Eukaryota
- Kingdom: Fungi
- Division: Basidiomycota
- Class: Agaricomycetes
- Order: Agaricales
- Family: Hygrophoraceae
- Genus: Cyphellostereum
- Species: C. brasiliense

Binomial name
- Cyphellostereum brasiliense Ryvarden (2010)

Species of lichen

Cyphellostereum brasiliense is a species of basidiolichen in the family Hygrophoraceae. Found in Brazil, it was formally described as a new species in 2010 by Norwegian mycologist Leif Ryvarden. The type specimen was collected in São Paulo, where it was found growing on dead mosses. The species has a rounded to slightly spoon-shaped cap, and club-shaped basidia measuring 18–25 by 5–6 μm with oblong to ellipsoid basidiospores measuring 7–8 by 3.5–4.5 μm.
