= Symphyonemataceae =

Scientific classification
- Domain: Bacteria
- Phylum: Cyanobacteria
- Class: Cyanophyceae
- Order: Nostocales
- Family: Symphyonemataceae; Hoffmann, Komárek, & Kaštovský

Genera
- Adrianema DeToni 1936; Brachytrichia Zanardini ex Bornet & Flahault 1887; Herpyzonema Weber van Bosse 1913; Ifinoe Lamprinou & Pantazidou 2011; Iyengariella Desikachary 1953; Loriellopsis Hernandéz Mariné & Canals 2011; Mastigocladopsis Iyengar & Desikachary 1946; Parenchymorpha Tseng & Hua 1984; Symphyonema Jao 1944; Symphyonemopsis Gugger & Hoffmann 2004; Voukiella Ercegović 1925

Family of bacteria

The Symphyonemataceae is a family of cyanobacteria.
