= Godleyaceae =

Scientific classification
- Domain: Bacteria
- Phylum: Cyanobacteria
- Class: Cyanophyceae
- Order: Nostocales
- Family: Godleyaceae; Hauer, Mareš, Bohunická, Johansen, & Berrendero-Gomez

Genera
- Godleya Novis & Visnovsky 2011; Toxopsis Lamprinou et al. 2012

Family of bacteria

The Godleyaceae are a family of cyanobacteria.
