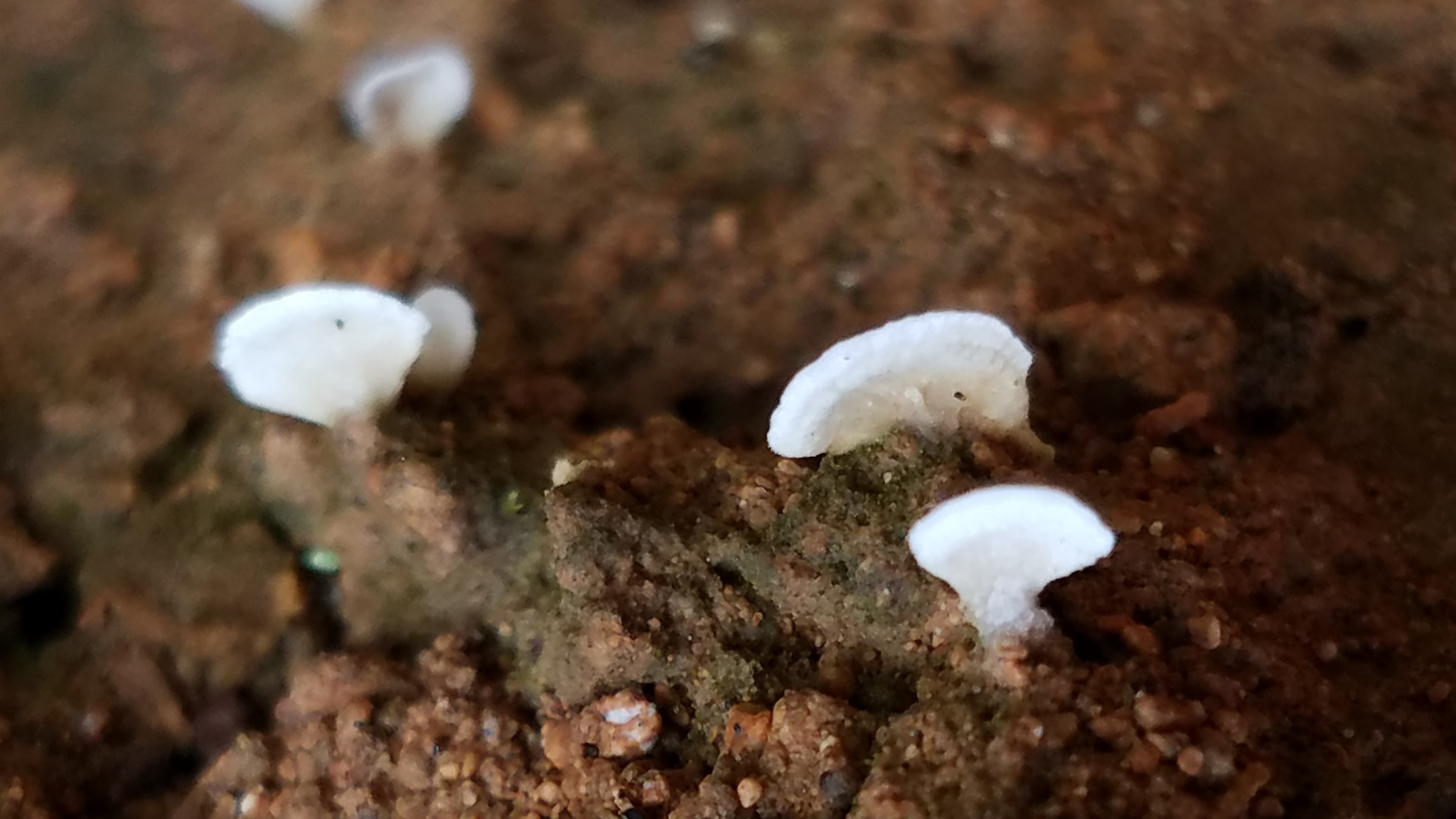
- Cyphellostereum pusiolum

Scientific classification
- Kingdom: Fungi
- Division: Basidiomycota
- Class: Agaricomycetes
- Order: Agaricales
- Family: Hygrophoraceae
- Genus: Cyphellostereum; D.A.Reid (1965)

Type species
- Cyphellostereum pusiolum (Berk. & M.A.Curtis) D.A.Reid (1965)

Species
- see text

= Cyphellostereum =

Genus of fungi

Cyphellostereum is a genus of basidiolichens. Species produce white, somewhat cup-shaped fruit bodies on a thin film of green on soil which is the thallus. All Cyphellostereum species have nonamyloid spores and tissues, lack clamp connections, and also lack hymenial cystidia.

DNA research has shown that a common, north temperate species formerly known as Cyphellostereum laeve is not related to the type species and belongs in a quite separate order, the Hymenochaetales. It has been renamed Muscinupta laevis.

== Etymology ==
The name Cyphellostereum combines two generic names: Cyphella in reference to the inverted cupulate form (like the genus Cyphella); and Stereum, in reference to the stipitate fan-shape or bracket shape (as in species of Stereum).

== Evolution and morphology ==
Multilocus phylogenetic trees recover Cyphellostereum as a monophyletic, basal branch that is sister to all other genera in the Dictyonema clade. Occupying this early-diverging spot, the genus retains the simplest thallus: a bluish, crust-like weave of cyanobacterial filaments (trichomes) sheathed by the fungus, with no layered cortex or medulla that would distinguish an upper or lower surface. Its reproductive structures are tiny, cup-shaped cyphelloid fruiting bodies (basidiocarps) that sit on the thallus rather than being swallowed by it; the hyphae that build these cups differ markedly from the slender hyphae that merely clothe the photobiont threads. The fungal sheath is made of irregular, cylindrical cells full of air-gaps and it entirely lacks the tubular haustoria and "jigsaw-puzzle" cell walls that later genera use to tap nutrients from the cyanobacteria. The cyanobacterial partner (Rhizonema) forms unusually narrow cells (roughly 5–8 μm wide), and specimens often harbour extra cyanobacteria or even stray green algae, signalling a looser, more opportunistic symbiosis than is typical for the group. Comparative studies also show that the Rhizonema photobiont in Cyphellostereum develops trichomes with narrower, higher, roughly quadrate cells that are more distinctly blue than the broader, low-celled forms typical of Dictyonema.

Internal transcribed spacer (ITS) DNA in Cyphellostereum shows the highest length variation and alignment ambiguity within the clade, consistent with an ancient, slowly diverging lineage. Because it preserves this primitive, loosely integrated architecture while its descendants evolve ever more complex, leaf-like thalli, Cyphellostereum offers a living snapshot of the earliest steps toward basidiomycete lichenisation.

== Species ==
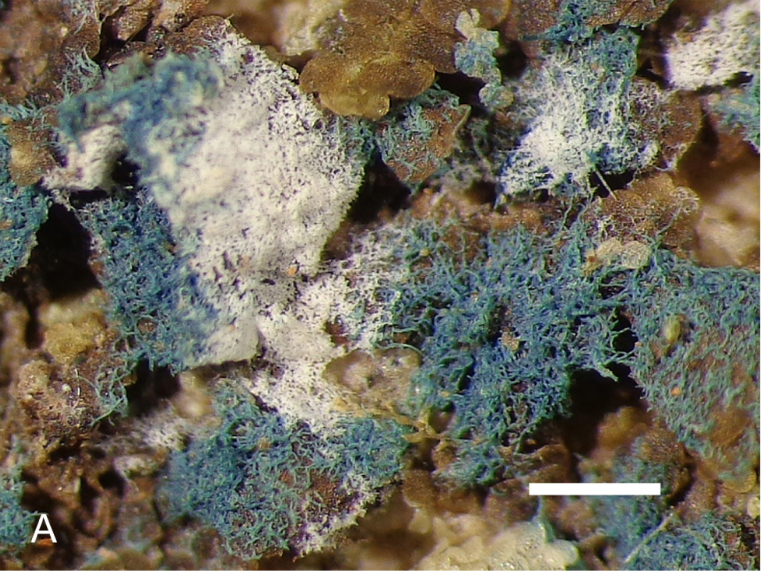
The thallus of Cyphellostereum bicolor comprises filamentous, bicoloured patches; scale bar=1 mm

- Cyphellostereum bicolor Lücking & Timdal (2016)
- Cyphellostereum brasiliense Ryvarden (2010)
- Cyphellostereum galapagoense (Yánez, Dal-Forno & Bungartz) Dal-Forno, Bungartz & Lücking (2017)
- Cyphellostereum georgianum Dal Forno, McMullin & Lücking (2019)
- Cyphellostereum imperfectum Lücking, Barillas & Dal-Forno (2012)
- Cyphellostereum indicum S.Nayaka & A.Debnath (2023) – India
- Cyphellostereum jamesianum Dal Forno & Kaminsky (2019)
- Cyphellostereum mucuyense V.Marcano (2022)
- Cyphellostereum muscicola (Pat.) D.A.Reid (1965)
- Cyphellostereum nitidum (Lücking) Lücking (2012)
- Cyphellostereum phyllogenum (Müll.Arg.) Lücking, Dal-Forno & Lawrey (2013)
- Cyphellostereum pusiolum (Berk. & M.A.Curtis) D.A.Reid (1965)
- Cyphellostereum rivulorum (Berk. & M.A.Curtis) D.A.Reid (1965)
- Cyphellostereum unoquinoum Dal-Forno, Bungartz & Lücking (2017)
- Cyphellostereum ushimanum H.Masumoto & Y.Degawa (2022) – Japan

== See also ==
- List of Agaricales genera
