= Rhizonema =

Scientific classification
- Domain: Bacteria
- Kingdom: Bacillati
- Phylum: Cyanobacteriota
- Class: Cyanophyceae
- Order: Nostocales
- Family: Rhizonemataceae; Büdel & Kauff ex Lücking & Barrie, 2014
- Genus: Rhizonema; Lücking & Barrie, 2014
- Species: R. interruptum

Binomial name
- Rhizonema interruptum Lücking & Barrie, 2014

Single-species algal genus

Rhizonema is a genus comprising a single filament-forming cyanobacterium that lives almost exclusively inside lichens. Rhizonema was first recognised as a distinct, exclusively lichen‑forming lineage in 2009, when molecular evidence showed its photobionts were unrelated to free‑living Scytonema and merited their own genus and family. It is currently the only member of the family Rhizonemataceae, with a single accepted species, Rhizonema interruptum. The cyanobacterium forms blue-green to yellowish filaments composed of rectangular cells (with nitrogen-fixing cells called heterocysts) and produces true, Y-shaped branches, which are features that distinguish it from superficially similar photobionts. Found in lichens from Europe to East Asia, it occupies humid forest habitats on bark, mosses and shaded rock.

== Taxonomy ==
The photobiont was first described in the 1830s as Calothrix interrupta, but those early names are invalid because heterocystous (nitrogen-fixing) cyanobacteria lacked formal starting dates until 1886. In 1849 George Henry Kendrick Thwaites coined Rhizonema for the same organism, yet the name lapsed until a 2009 molecular survey revived it and demonstrated that the lineage is unrelated to Stigonema or Scytonema and merits its own genus and family. That 2009 phylogeny placed Rhizonema as the well-supported sister group to the heterocystous genera Nostoc, Anabaena, Fischerella and Hapalosiphon, a relationship that justified recognising a separate family. The family name was mentioned in passing by Burkhard Büdel and Frank Kauff (2012) as 'Rhizonemataceae', but because they provided no formal description the name remained a nomen nudum. In 2014 the name Rhizonema was validly published together with the family Rhizonemataceae and the new combination R. interruptum for the type species. Phylogenetic analyses of 16S and rbcLX gene regions confirm that the genus forms a distinct clade separate from "true-branching" cyanobacterial families such as Stigonemataceae and Hapalosiphonaceae. The same molecular data reveal at least two well-supported subclades within R. interruptum, suggesting hidden diversity even within this nominal single species.

== Description ==
Microscopically, Rhizonema displays a scytonematoid habit: broad, rectangular cells embedded in a transparent sheath that holds the filament clear of the substrate. In lichenised form those filaments are isopolar (equally developed at both ends) chains (trichomes) that appear colourless or light brown and often contain yellowish heterocysts. Individual vegetative cells measure roughly 15–20 μm wide by 5–10 μm high, and many filaments contain yellowish heterocysts—specialised cells that fix atmospheric nitrogen for the symbiosis. True branches form when a cell divides slightly obliquely to the filament axis (so‑called T-type branching), producing a Y-shaped junction that distinguishes the genus from superficially similar Scytonema, which only shows false (breakage-based) branching.

Detailed microscopy of cultures and intact lichens has shown that the cyanobacterium is quite flexible: the same strain can form true branches, paired or single false branches caused by filament breakage, and even "pseudo-branches" where tiny trichome fragments re-attach and grow like side shoots. Oblique and longitudinal cell divisions sometimes create locally two- or three-cell-wide filaments, giving the appearance of a miniature "vertebral column" under the microscope. The same cyanobacterial strain can appear fully filamentous in one lichen but break into near-unicellular, grape-like clusters in another, showing how the fungal partner reshapes photobiont morphology. This plastic behaviour explains why earlier workers found the classical diagnostic characters hard to apply consistently.

Rhizonema interruptum itself is characterised by comparatively broad, low cells that turn from deep blue-green in shaded thallus interiors to yellow-green on exposed tips, sparse to abundant intercalary heterocysts, and infrequent but definite T-type branches. These features are easiest to see in the European basidiolichen Dictyonema coppinsii, whose thallus often exposes the photobiont at its surface.

== Habitat and distribution ==
Rhizonema has not been found living free in soil or water; instead, it serves as the photosynthetic partner (photobiont) in a wide range of lichens, especially basidiolichens of the genera Dictyonema, Cyphellostereum, Cora, Coccocarpia and Acantholichen. Surveys in Central and South America (Costa Rica, Guatemala, Bolivia and the Galápagos) and in South-East Asia (the Philippines) have recovered identical Rhizonema sequences, extending its range well beyond the Atlantic tropics. Despite such a wide geographic spread, no free-living populations have been confirmed; every environmental sequence to date comes from lichen thalli, implying an obligate symbiosis.

Because Rhizonema occurs in diverse lichen lineages on every continent studied, it is considered the second most widespread cyanobacterial photobiont after Nostoc. Typical habitats are humid, undisturbed forests where the host lichens grow on bark, epiphytic bryophytes or shaded rock faces in the lower canopy and understory.

The 2009 study proposed that ecologically similar but unrelated fungi form photobiont guilds that repeatedly share and exchange Rhizonema strains, much like farmers swapping high-yield crops. By fixing atmospheric nitrogen within these guilds, Rhizonema supplies a steady nutrient influx to humid cloud forest ecosystems and may influence local nitrogen cycling. Confirmed records of R. interruptum span oceanic western Europe—Ireland, Scotland, the Azores and Madeira—through subtropical Florida to montane Japan, with molecular data grouping the Florida and Japanese populations in sister subclades to the European material.
