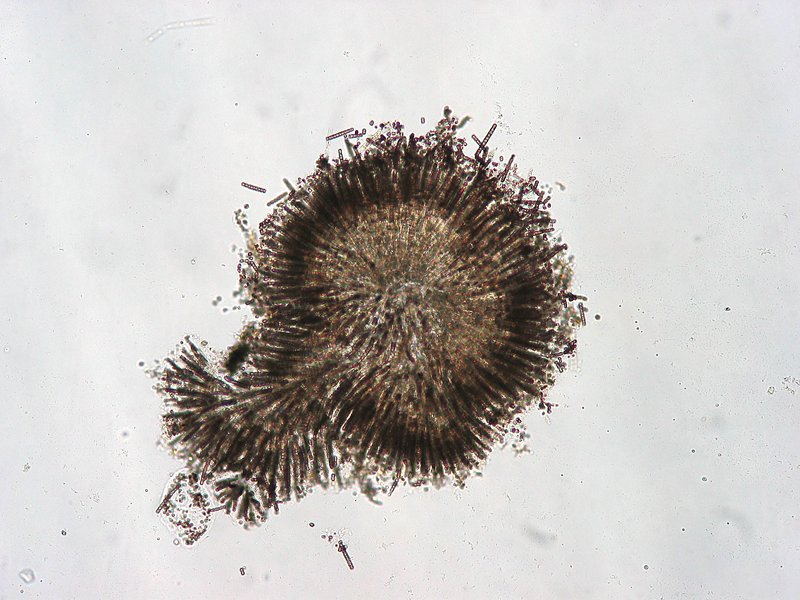
- Gloeotrichia echinulata

Scientific classification
- Domain: Bacteria
- Phylum: Cyanobacteria
- Class: Cyanophyceae
- Order: Nostocales
- Family: Rivulariaceae; Kützing ex Bornet & Flahault

Genera
- See text

= Rivulariaceae =

Family of bacteria

The Rivulariaceae are a family of cyanobacteria within the Nostocales in which the filaments (trichomes) are tapered from wider at the base to narrower at the tip.

The type species is Rivularia haematites (Dc) C. A. Agardh.

== Genera ==
As of 14 September 2021, WoRMS listed the following genera under Rivulariaceae:

- Amphithrix Bornet & Flahault, 1886
- Ariasmontanoa Molinari & Guiry, 2021
- Calothrix C.Agardh ex Bornet & Flahault, 1886
- Dichothrix Zanardini ex Bornet & Flahault, 1886
- Gaillardotella Bory de Saint-Vincent ex Kuntze, 1898
- Gardnerula G.De Toni, 1936
- Gloiotrichia J.Agardh, 1842
- Heteractis A.P.de Candolle, 1838
- Isactis Thuret ex Bornet & Flahault, 1886
- Macrochaete Berrendero, J.R.Johansen & Kastovsky, 2016
- Mastigonema H.Schwabe ex A.B.Frank, 1886
- Montanoa P.González, 1947
- Nunduva L.González-Resendiz, H.León-Tejera & J.R.Johansen, 2018
- Phyllonema D.O.Alvarenga, J.Rigonato, L.H.Z.Branco, I.S.Melo & M.F.Fiore, 2016
- Primorivularia A.-S.Edhorn, 1973
- Rivularia C.Agardh ex Bornet & Flahault, 1886
- Sacconema Borzì ex Bornet & Flahault, 1886: contains two species, one freshwater and another terrestrial;
- Tildenia Kossinskaja, 1926
- Zonotrichites J.G.Bornemann, 1886

As of 15 September 2021，AlgaeBase also includes the following genera under Rivulariaceae:

- Microchaete Thuret ex Bornet & Flahault 1886: is considered by WoRMS to remain under the subfamily of Microchaetoideae of family Microchaetaceae.
