= Chlorogloeopsis =

Scientific classification
- Domain: Bacteria
- Kingdom: Bacillati
- Phylum: Cyanobacteriota
- Class: Cyanophyceae
- Order: Nostocales
- Family: Chlorogloeopsidaceae (Mitra) Mitra & Pandey
- Genus: Chlorogloeopsis; Mitra & Pandey 1967

Genus of bacteria

Chlorogloeopsis is a genus of cyanobacteria, and is the only genus in the family Chlorogloeopsidaceae.
