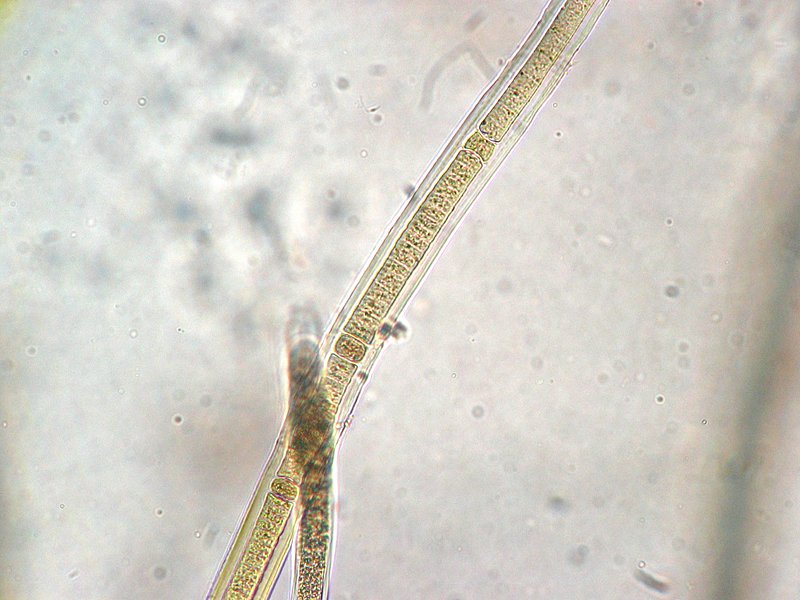
- Heterocyst of Scytonema crispum

Scientific classification
- Domain: Bacteria
- Phylum: Cyanobacteria
- Class: Cyanophyceae
- Order: Nostocales
- Family: Scytonemataceae; Rabenhorst ex Bornet & Flahault

Genera
- Brasilonema Fiore et al. 2007; Chakia Komárková et al. 2013; Kyrtuthrix Ercegović 1929; Ophiothrix Sant'Anna et al. 2010; Petalonema Berkeley ex Correns 1889; Scytonema Agardh ex Bornet & Flahault 1887; Scytonema sect. Myochrotes Bornet & Flahault 1887; Scytonematopsis Kiseleva 1930

= Scytonemataceae =

Family of bacteria

The Scytonemataceae are a family of filamentous, heterocystous cyanobacteria within the order Nostocales. The family is known from freshwater, marine, and terrestrial environments, where it grows in colonies attached to the substrate. Akinetes are not known, and the members of the family are known to reproduce with nonheterocystous hormogonia.
