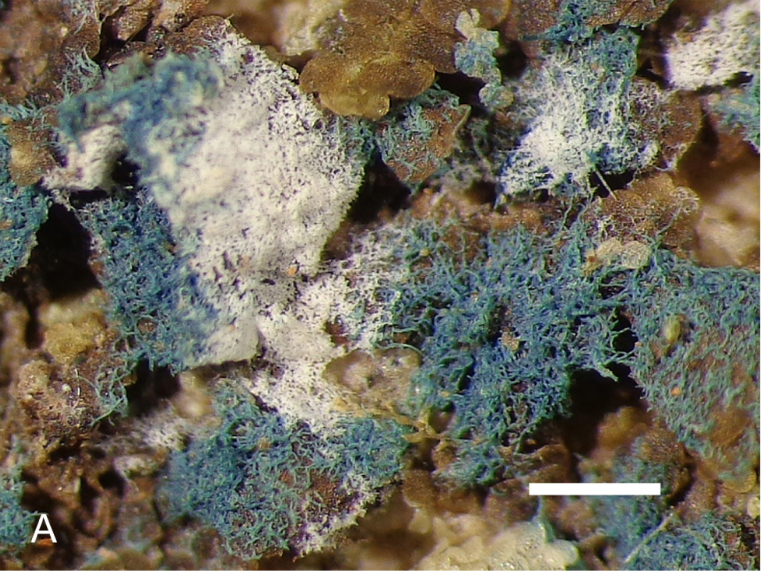
- The filamentous thallus forms matted patches of fibrils that contrast the blue-green cyanobacterial filaments and the white hyphal patches; scale bar = 1 mm

Scientific classification
- Kingdom: Fungi
- Division: Basidiomycota
- Class: Agaricomycetes
- Order: Agaricales
- Family: Hygrophoraceae
- Genus: Cyphellostereum
- Species: C. bicolor

Binomial name
- Cyphellostereum bicolor Lücking & Timdal (2016)

= Cyphellostereum bicolor =

Species of lichen

Cyphellostereum bicolor is a species of corticolous (bark-dwelling) basidiolichen in the family Hygrophoraceae. Found in Mauritius, it was formally described as a new species by lichenologists Robert Lücking and Einar Timdal. The type specimen was collected from the Bambou Mountains (Grand Port District) at an elevation of 250–300 m (820–980 ft), where it was found growing on tree bark. The species epithet bicolor refers to the notable visual contrast between the vivid blue-green cyanobacterial filaments and the white hyphal patches that give rise to the hymenophore.

== Description ==
The lichen forms a dense mat of fibrils, which are interwoven and connected by a thin to indistinct hypothallus. These fibrils are horizontal to irregularly subascending, and have a vivid and uniform aeruginous color, often interspersed with white patches of densely woven, byssoid hyphae that eventually develop into hymenophores.

In cross-section, the fibrils are solitary and do not form agglutinated tufts. Each fibril has its own hyphal sheath, which is 11–14 μm wide and approximately 2 μm thick, and is colourless. The cyanobacterial filaments that compose the fibrils are 7–9 μm wide and 5–6 μm high, and have bluish-green color. They lack tubular fungal hyphae as haustoria and have sparse heterocytes that are hyaline to yellowish and 6–8 μm wide and 4–6 μm high. The hyphal sheath is formed by loosely arranged, cylindrical, and curved hyphae that wrap around the cyanobacterial filaments.

The hyphae of the hypothallus and those associated with the fibrils or forming apical setae are straight, hyaline, 3–5 μm thick, and lack clamp connections. The hymenophore is developed on or underneath the white, byssoid areas as irregular, resupinate, effuse patches, with patches typically measuring 0.5–1 mm in diameter. The hymenophore is more or less flat, with a white, smooth surface, but often has cracks and interspaces without distinct margins.

In cross-section, the hymenophore is 30–50 μm thick and composed of a woven, strongly hydrophobic layer resting on agglutinated, 4–6 μm thick, generative hyphae that emerge from the supporting thallus. The hymenium forms protruding, palisade-like basidioles, which measure 20–30 by 5–6 μm. Basidia and basidiospores were not observed in this species.
