= Cyphellostereum jamesianum =

Scientific classification
- Kingdom: Fungi
- Division: Basidiomycota
- Class: Agaricomycetes
- Order: Agaricales
- Family: Hygrophoraceae
- Genus: Cyphellostereum
- Species: C. jamesianum

Binomial name
- Cyphellostereum jamesianum Dal Forno & Kaminsky (2019)

Species of lichen

Cyphellostereum jamesianum is a species of basidiolichen belonging to the family Hygrophoraceae that was described as new to science in 2019. It has been found in South Carolina and in Florida on a Taxodium wetland fragment at Florida Gulf Coast University. The species was named for James D. Lawrey.
