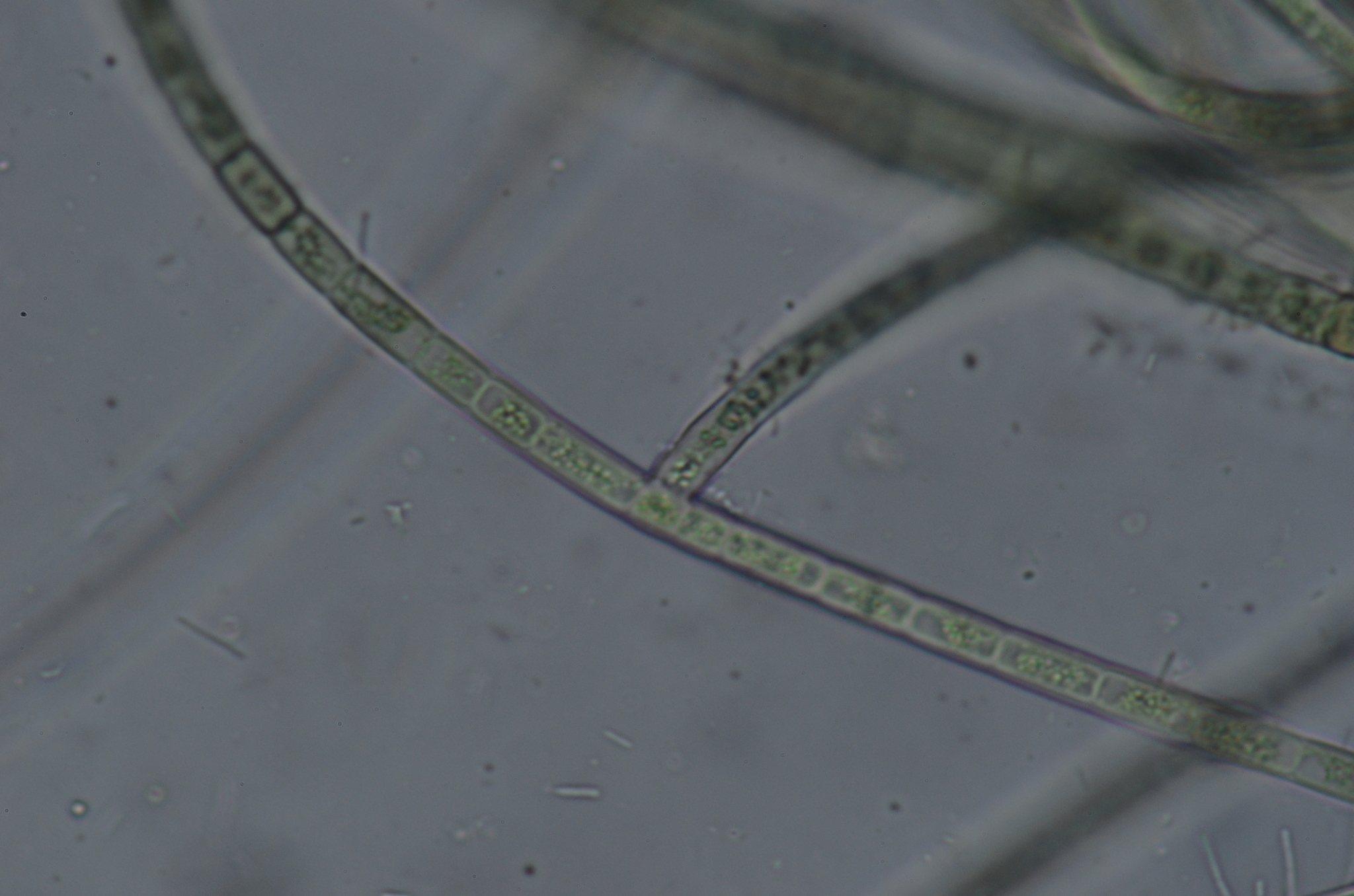
- Hapalosiphon hibernicus

Scientific classification
- Domain: Bacteria
- Phylum: Cyanobacteria
- Class: Cyanophyceae
- Order: Nostocales
- Family: Hapalosiphonaceae; Elenkin

Genera
- Aetokthonos Wilde et al. 2014; Albrightia Copeland 1936; Baradlaia Palik 1960; Brachytrichiopsis Jao 1944; Chondrogloea Schmidle 1902; Colteronema Copeland 1936; Fischerella (Bornet & Flahault) Gomont 1895; Fischerellopsis Fritsch 1932; Geitleria Friedmann 1955; Handeliella Skuja 1937; Hapalosiphon Nägeli in Kützing ex Bornet & Flahault 1887; Hyphomorpha Borzì 1916; Leptopogon Borzì 1917; Letestuinema Frémy 1930; Loefgrenia Gomont 1896; Loriella Borzì 1892; Mastigocladus Cohn ex Kirchner 1898; Mastigocoleopsis Geitler 1925; Mastigocoleus Lagerheim ex Bornet & Flahault 1887; Matteia Borzě 1907; Nostochopsis Wood ex Bornet & Flahault 1886; Schmidleinema DeToni 1936; Spelaeopogon Borzì 1917; Thalpophila Borzì 1907; Westiella Borzì 1907; Westiellopsis Janet 1941

= Hapalosiphonaceae =

Family of bacteria

The Hapalosiphonaceae are a family of cyanobacteria.
