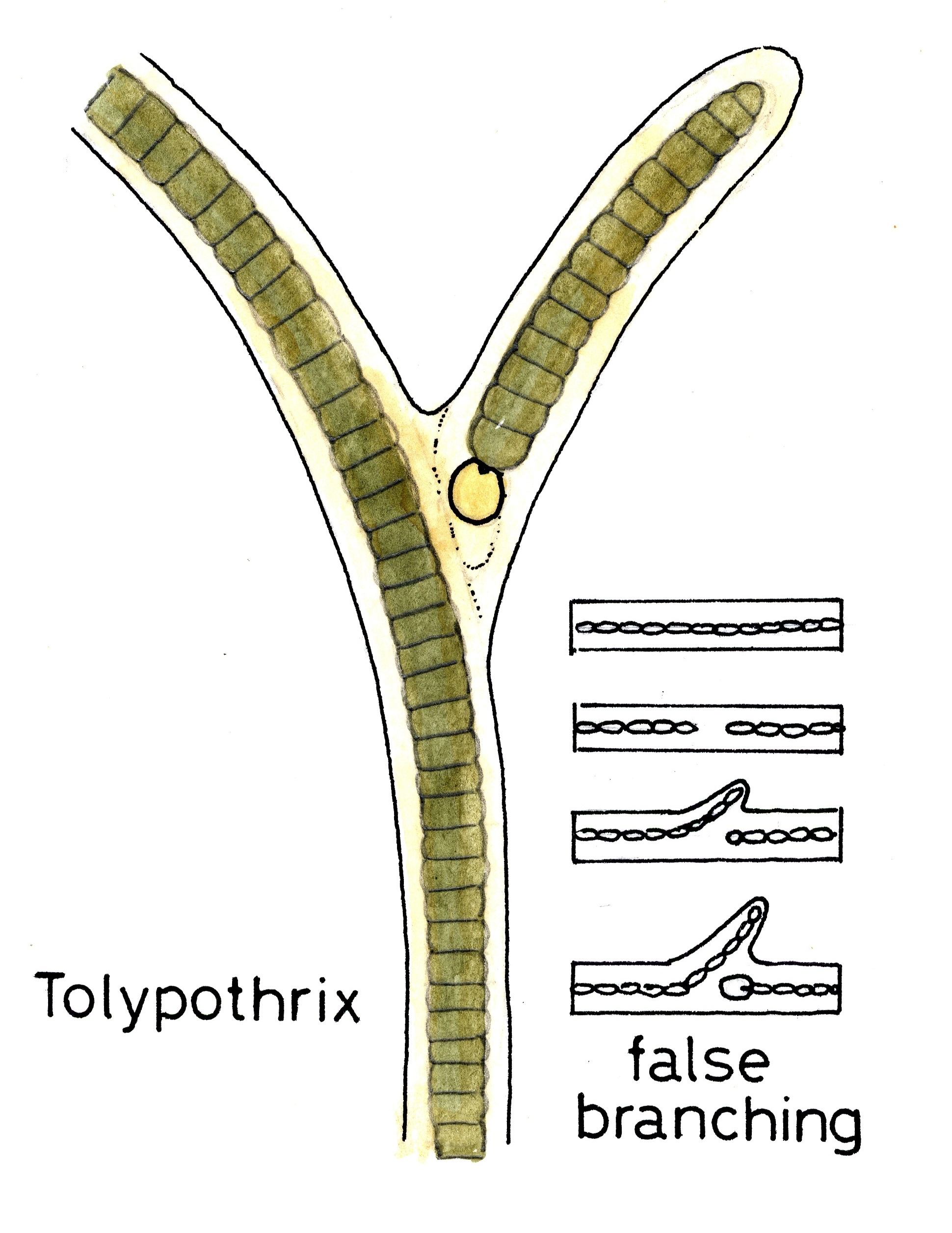
- Tolypothrix

Scientific classification
- Domain: Bacteria
- Phylum: Cyanobacteria
- Class: Cyanophyceae
- Order: Nostocales
- Family: Tolypothrichaceae; Hauer, Mareš, Bohunická, Johansen, & Berrendero-Gomez

Genera
- Borzinema DeToni 1936; Coleodesmium Borzì ex Geitler 1942; Dactylothamnos Fiore et al. 2013 provis.; Hassallia Berkeley ex Bornet & Flahault 1888; Rexia Casamatta et al. 2006; Seguenzaea Borzì 1907; Spirirestis Flechtner & Johansen 2002; Streptostemon Sant'Anna et al. 2010; Tolypothrix Kützing ex Bornet & Flahault 1887

Synonyms
- Microchaetaceae

= Tolypothrichaceae =

Family of bacteria

The Tolypothrichaceae are a family of cyanobacteria.
