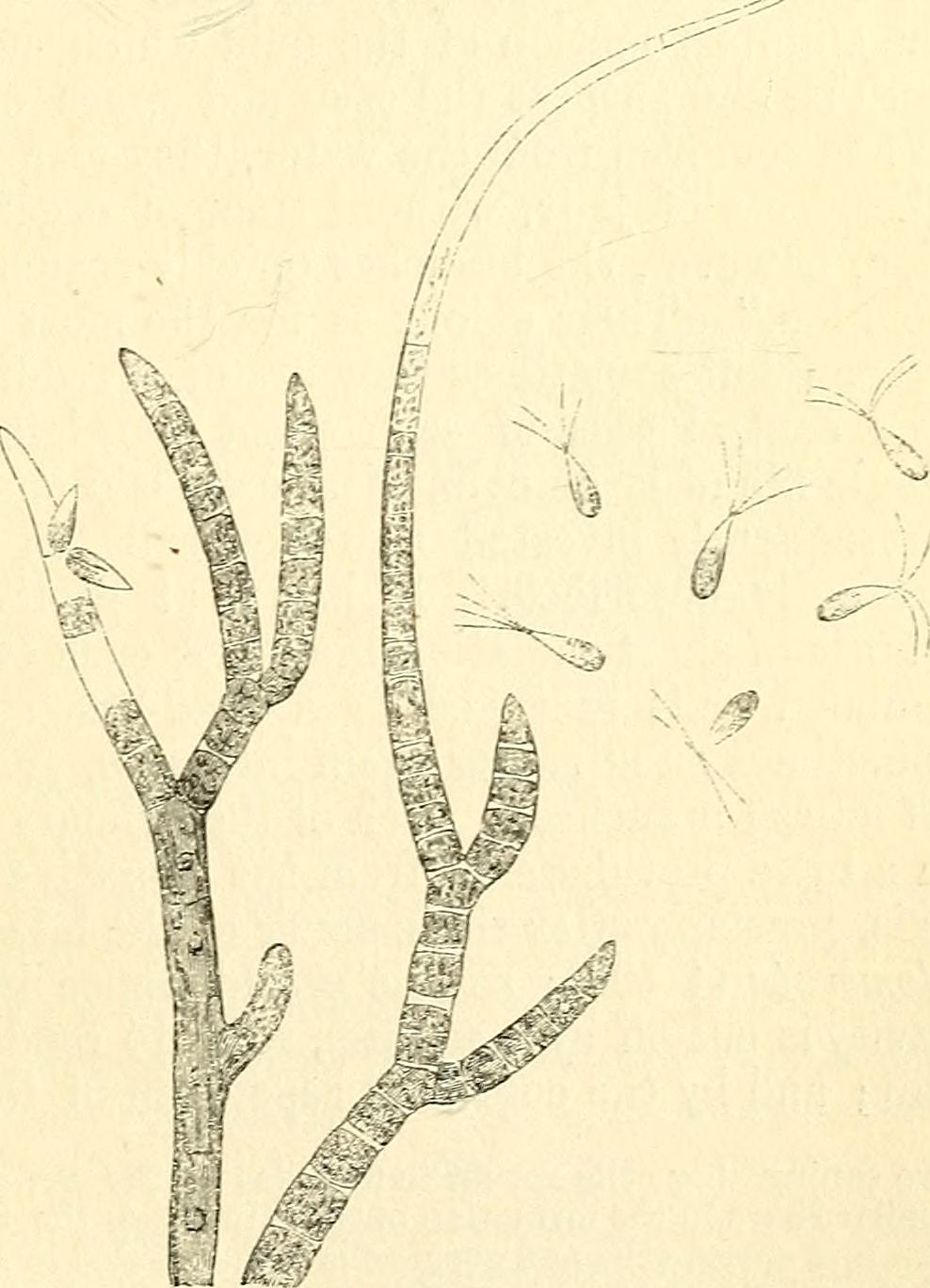

Scientific classification
- Clade: Viridiplantae
- Division: Chlorophyta
- Class: Chlorophyceae
- Order: Chaetophorales
- Family: Chaetophoraceae
- Genus: Chaetophoropsis
- Species: C. elegans

Binomial name
- Chaetophoropsis elegans F. Schrank, 1783

Subspecies
- Chaetophora elegans var. longipila (Kützing) Hansgirg

Synonyms
- Rivularia elegans Roth, 1802; Chaetophora elegans (Roth) C.Agardh, 1812

= Chaetophoropsis elegans =

Species of alga

Chaetophoropsis elegans is the type species of the genus Chaetophoropsis. It is commonly found in freshwater habitats, where it grows attached to rocks and plants.

It was previously considered to be part of the genus Chaetophora, but the genus was split when it was found to be polyphyletic. Chaetophora sensu stricto consists of species with lobed thalli, while Chaetophoropsis has globose thalli.

Its EPPO code is KHREL.

== Description ==
Chaetophoropsis elegans consists of pale green, spherical or hemispherical thalli enclosed within a soft mucilaginous envelope. The thalli consist of dichotomously or trichotomously branched filaments, which grow out from the center of attachment. Uppermost branches are densely clustered and taper towards the apex. It is distinguished from similar species by having soft mucilage and light green thalli.
