= Miconia robinsoniana =

Scientific classification
- Kingdom: Plantae
- Clade: Tracheophytes
- Clade: Angiosperms
- Clade: Eudicots
- Clade: Rosids
- Order: Myrtales
- Family: Melastomataceae
- Genus: Miconia
- Species: M. robinsoniana

Binomial name
- Miconia robinsoniana Cogn. (1902)

Species of plant

Miconia robinsoniana is a species of flowering plant in the genus Miconia. It is native to the Galápagos Islands.
