= Cyphellostereum unoquinoum =

Scientific classification
- Kingdom: Fungi
- Division: Basidiomycota
- Class: Agaricomycetes
- Order: Agaricales
- Family: Hygrophoraceae
- Genus: Cyphellostereum
- Species: C. unoquinoum

Binomial name
- Cyphellostereum unoquinoum Dal-Forno, Bungartz & Lücking (2017)

Species of lichen

Cyphellostereum unoquinoum is a little-known species of basidiolichen in the family Hygrophoraceae. It was first described as a new species in 2017 and is known only from a single location high in the humid forests of Floreana Island in the Galápagos. The lichen forms loose mats of green, hair-like threads that grow on moss-covered tree branches. Its closest genetic relative appears to be a species from Fiji.

== Taxonomy ==
Cyphellostereum unoquinoum was formally described as a new species by the lichenologists Manuela Dal-Forno, Frank Bungartz and Robert Lücking in 2017. The species epithet unoquinoum honours the Galápagos National Park, encoding its founding year 1959 via the Latin numerals unum (1), novem (9), quinque (5) and novem (9). The authors placed the species in Cyphellostereum, one of four genera in the Dictyonema clade of lichen-forming basidiomycetes recognised from the Galápagos Islands (the others are Acantholichen, Cora and Dictyonema). Phylogenetically, the species appears closest to material identified as C. phyllogenum from Fiji, showing that its nearest relative lies far outside the archipelago. Before molecular data were available, the type collection had been misidentified as Dictyonema galapagoense (now C. galapagoense), but differences in morphology and DNA sequences revealed it to be distinct.

== Description ==
The lichen forms a loose, felt-like thallus (the visible body of a lichen) composed of green, hair-thin fibrils (filament bundles) that lie in a sparse mat rather than a dense turf. Each fibril contains chains of cyanobacteria enveloped by a sinuous fungal hyphal sheath, but the sheath does not completely close around the cyanobacterial threads—one of the key traits separating this species from its Galápagos relative C. galapagoense. Cyanobacterial cells measure 7.5–11 micrometres wide and often develop pale yellow heterocysts—specialised nitrogen-fixing cells—at regular intervals. No hymenophores (fungal fruiting body patches) have been observed, so spore production has yet to be documented in the field.

== Habitat and distribution ==
Cyphellostereum unoquinoum is so far known only from its type locality high in the humid zone of Floreana Island, Galápagos (roughly 531 m elevation on Cerro Asilo de la Paz). It grows epiphytically—that is, harmlessly upon the surface—of moss-rich bryophyte mats draped over tree branches in dense Scalesia and Psidium woodland. The species has been collected only once despite intensive surveys; accordingly, it is considered endemic to the Galápagos and potentially vulnerable due to its extremely restricted range.
