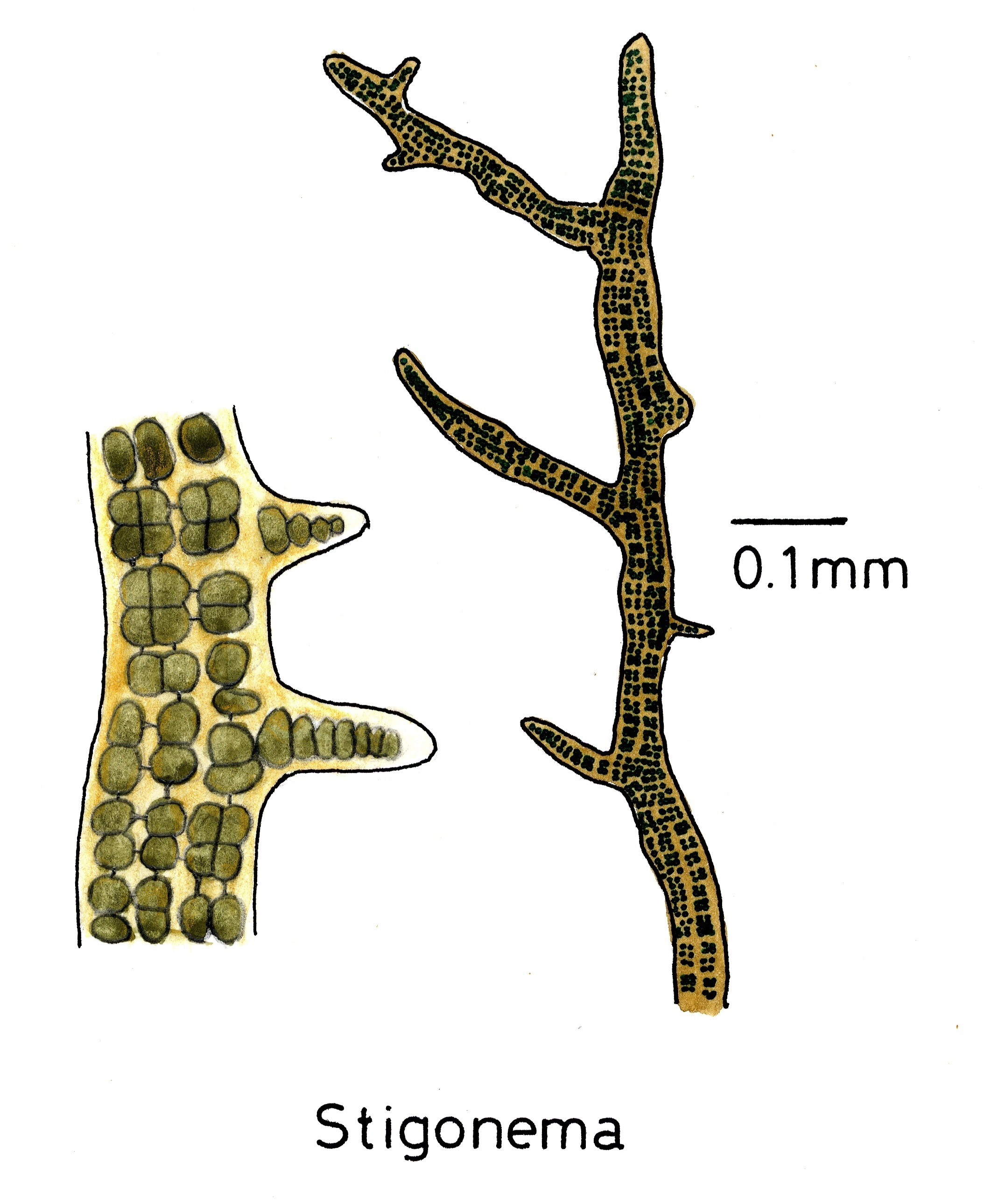
- Stigonema, illustration

Scientific classification
- Domain: Bacteria
- Phylum: Cyanobacteria
- Class: Cyanophyceae
- Order: Nostocales
- Family: Stigonemataceae; Borzì

Genera
- Cyanobotrys Hoffmann 1991; Doliocatella Geitler 1933; Homoeoptyche Skuja 1944; Pulvinularia Borzì 1916; Stigonema C. Agardh ex Bornet & Flahault 1886

= Stigonemataceae =

Family of bacteria

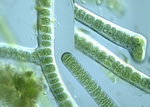
Stigonema sp.

The Stigonemataceae are a family of cyanobacteria.
