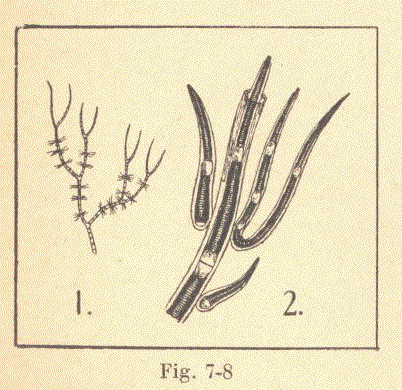
- A 1921 drawing of Calothrix

Scientific classification
- Domain: Bacteria
- Kingdom: Bacillati
- Phylum: Cyanobacteriota
- Class: Cyanophyceae
- Order: Nostocales
- Family: Rivulariaceae
- Genus: Calothrix; Bornet & Flahault 1886

Type species
- Calothrix confervicola Agardh ex Bornet and Flahault 1886

Species
- Calothrix adscendens Calothrix atricha Calothrix braunii Calothrix breviarticulata Calothrix caespitora Calothrix confervicola Calothrix crustacea Calothrix donnelli Calothrix elenkinii Calothrix epiphytica Calothrix fusca Calothrix juliana Calothrix parasitica Calothrix parietina Calothrix pilosa Calothrix pulvinata Calothrix scopulorum Calothrix scytonemicola Calothrix simulans Calothrix solitaria Calothrix stagnalis Calothrix stellaris Calothrix thermalis Calothrix 336/3

= Calothrix =

Genus of bacteria

Calothrix is a genus of cyanobacteria. They are generally found in freshwater.

== Removed members ==
Some members of the genus such as Calothrix rhizosoleniae are endosymbionts of diatoms, providing a nitrogen-fixing function. It is assigned by Bergey's to Richelia, which is closely related to this species (unlike the rest of Calothrix.

GTDB Release 10-RS226 (16th April 2025) does not include Calothrix as a genus, opting to instead assign its members to other genera. No genomes of the type species are available.
