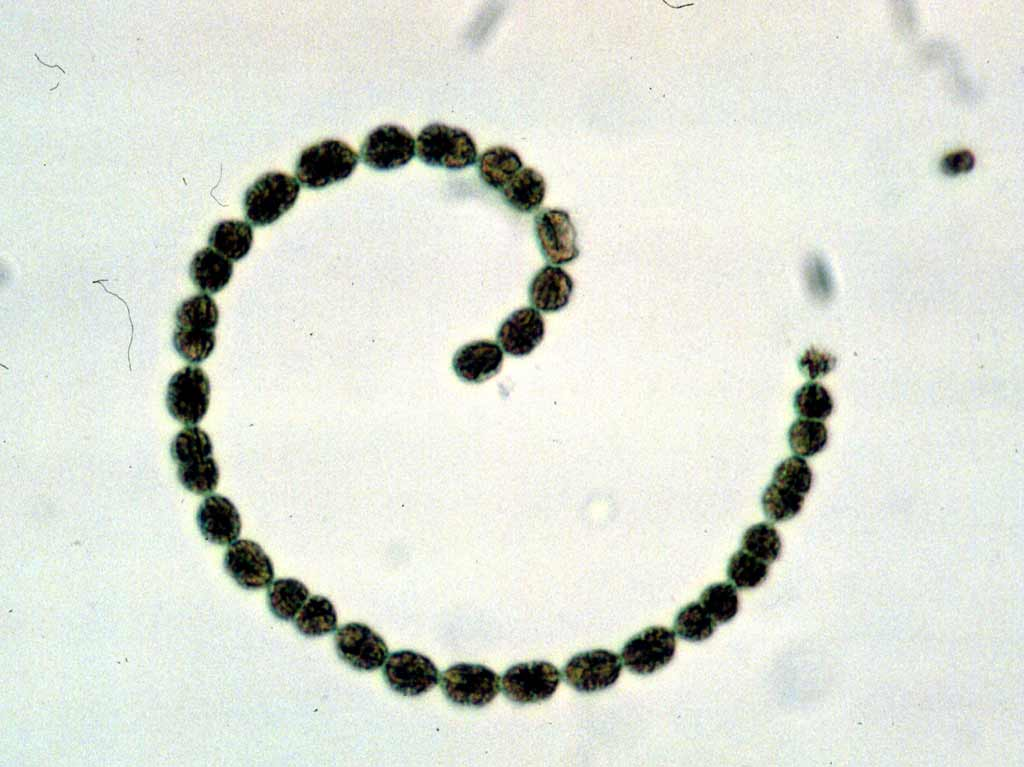
- Anabaena flos-aquae

Scientific classification
- Domain: Bacteria
- Kingdom: Bacillati
- Phylum: Cyanobacteriota
- Class: Cyanophyceae
- Order: Nostocales; T.Cavalier-Smith

Families
- Aphanizomenonaceae Elenkin; Capsosiraceae (Geitler) Elenkin; Chlorogloeopsidaceae (Mitra) Mitra & Pandey; Fortieaceae; Gloeotrichiaceae Komárek et al. 2014; Godleyaceae Hauer, Mareš, Bohunická, Johansen, & Berrendero-Gomez; Hapalosiphonaceae Elenkin; Nostocaceae C. A. Agardh ex Kirchner; Rhizonemataceae; Rivulariaceae Kützing ex Bornet & Flahault; Scytonemataceae Rabenhorst ex Bornet & Flahault; Stigonemataceae Borzì; Symphyonemataceae Hoffmann, Komárek, & Kaštovský; Tolypothrichaceae Hauer, Mareš, Bohunická, Johansen, & Berrendero-Gomez

Synonyms
- Hormogonales

= Nostocales =

Order of bacteria

The Nostocales are an order of cyanobacteria containing most of its species. It includes filamentous forms, both simple or branched, and both those occurring as single strands or multiple strands within a sheath. Some members show a decrease in width from the base, and some have heterocysts.
