= Hoiamides =

- Hoiamide A (R = H) and hoiamide B (R = methyl)

- Hoiamide C (R = ethyl) and hoiamide D (R = H)

Identifiers
3D model (JSmol)	A: Interactive image; B: Interactive image; C: Interactive image; D: Interactive image
ChEMBL	A: ChEMBL1215858; B: ChEMBL1215859; C: ChEMBL1215860; D: ChEMBL1935083
ChemSpider	A: 27024431; B: 25059566; C: 25032428; D: 28185012
PubChem CID	A: 49864267; B: 46919100; C: 46919101; D: 56835050
- InChI: A: InChI=1S/C44H71N5O10S3/c1-14-16-23(6)33(51)25(8)36-24(7)29(57-13)17-30-45-28(18-60-30)38-48-44(12,20-61-38)42-49-43(11,19-62-42)41(56)47-31(22(5)15-2)34(52)26(9)39(54)58-35(21(3)4)37(53)46-32(27(10)50)40(55)59-36/h18,21-27,29,31-36,50-52H,14-17,19-20H2,1-13H3,(H,46,53)(H,47,56)/t22-,23+,24-,25-,26+,27+,29-,31-,32-,33-,34-,35-,36-,43+,44+/m0/s1 Key: AJORQYDPWJZVAU-KCIYAEAGSA-N; B: InChI=1S/C45H73N5O10S3/c1-14-17-24(6)34(52)26(8)37-25(7)30(58-13)18-31-46-29(19-61-31)39-49-45(12,21-62-39)43-50-44(11,20-63-43)42(57)48-32(22(4)15-2)35(53)27(9)40(55)59-36(23(5)16-3)38(54)47-33(28(10)51)41(56)60-37/h19,22-28,30,32-37,51-53H,14-18,20-21H2,1-13H3,(H,47,54)(H,48,57)/t22-,23-,24+,25-,26-,27+,28+,30-,32-,33-,34-,35-,36-,37-,44+,45+/m0/s1 Key: KNGPFNUOXXLKCN-ZNCJFREWSA-N; C: InChI=1S/C37H62N4O7S3/c1-12-15-21(5)29(42)23(7)30(43)22(6)26(47-11)16-27-38-25(17-49-27)32-40-37(10,19-50-32)35-41-36(9,18-51-35)34(46)39-28(20(4)13-2)31(44)24(8)33(45)48-14-3/h17,20-24,26,28-31,42-44H,12-16,18-19H2,1-11H3,(H,39,46)/t20-,21+,22-,23-,24+,26-,28-,29-,30-,31-,36+,37+/m0/s1 Key: STGNMXQTWDOGSE-FUVSMVGWSA-N; D: InChI=1S/C35H58N4O7S3/c1-11-13-19(4)27(40)21(6)28(41)20(5)24(46-10)14-25-36-23(15-47-25)30-38-35(9,17-48-30)33-39-34(8,16-49-33)32(45)37-26(18(3)12-2)29(42)22(7)31(43)44/h15,18-22,24,26-29,40-42H,11-14,16-17H2,1-10H3,(H,37,45)(H,43,44)/t18-,19+,20-,21-,22+,24-,26-,27-,28-,29-,34+,35+/m0/s1 Key: QJJZOVMGNCPTJN-WDSAYIENSA-N
- SMILES: A: CCC[C@@H](C)[C@@H]([C@H](C)[C@@H]1[C@H]([C@H](CC2=NC(=CS2)C3=N[C@](CS3)(C4=N[C@](CS4)(C(=O)N[C@H]([C@H]([C@H](C(=O)O[C@H](C(=O)N[C@H](C(=O)O1)[C@@H](C)O)C(C)C)C)O)[C@@H](C)CC)C)C)OC)C)O; B: CCC[C@@H](C)[C@@H]([C@H](C)[C@@H]1[C@H]([C@H](CC2=NC(=CS2)C3=N[C@](CS3)(C4=N[C@](CS4)(C(=O)N[C@H]([C@H]([C@H](C(=O)O[C@H](C(=O)N[C@H](C(=O)O1)[C@@H](C)O)[C@@H](C)CC)C)O)[C@@H](C)CC)C)C)OC)C)O; C: CCC[C@@H](C)[C@@H]([C@H](C)[C@H]([C@@H](C)[C@H](CC1=NC(=CS1)C2=N[C@@](CS2)(C)C3=N[C@@](CS3)(C)C(=O)N[C@@H]([C@@H](C)CC)[C@H]([C@@H](C)C(=O)OCC)O)OC)O)O; D: CCC[C@@H](C)[C@@H]([C@H](C)[C@H]([C@@H](C)[C@H](CC1=NC(=CS1)C2=N[C@@](CS2)(C)C3=N[C@@](CS3)(C)C(=O)N[C@@H]([C@@H](C)CC)[C@H]([C@@H](C)C(=O)O)O)OC)O)O
- Except where otherwise noted, data are given for materials in their standard state (at 25 °C [77 °F], 100 kPa). Infobox references

The hoiamides are a class of small molecules recently characterized from isolations of secondary metabolites of cyanobacteria that feature a triheterocyclic system. Hoiamide A and B are cyclic while hoiamide C and D are linear. Hoiamide A and B demonstrate neurotoxicity by acting on mammalian voltage gated sodium channels, while hoiamide D shows inhibition of the p53/MDM2 complex. The hoiamides are promising therapeutic targets, making their total synthesis an attractive feat.

== Structural class ==
The structural class of hoiamides is charactered by an acetate extended and S-adenosyl methionine modified isoleucine unit. Central to the molecule is a triheterocyclic system made of two α-methylated thiazolines and one thiazole, and a highly oxygenated and methylated C-15 polyketide unit. The hoiamides are stereochemically complex structures, with hoiamide A and B exhibiting 15 chiral centers.

== History ==
Marine cyanobacteria obtained by SCUBA in Papua New Guinea offer abundant secondary metabolites. Sometimes called blue-green algae, marine cyanobacteria have long been recognized for their toxic effects. Since the 1930s, collections have been gathered from these organisms.

Hoiamide A was isolated in 2009 from Lyngbya majuscula and Phormidium gracile through screening of cyanobacteria extracts using high throughput calcium and sodium ion influx assay in neocortical mouse neurons. Other groups have also found hoiamide A in M. producens and Phormidium gracile. Hoiamide B and C were isolated in 2010 from Symploca sp. and Oscillatoria cf. Hoiamide D was isolated in 2012 from Symploca sp. The total synthesis of hoiamide C was completed in 2011.

== Bioactivity ==
=== Hoiamide A ===
In mouse neocortical neurons, hoiamide A acts as a partial agonist to site two of the mammalian voltage gated sodium channel (VGSC). In electrically excitable cells VGSC allow the influx of sodium that causes the rising phase of the action potential. Hoiamide A stimulated sodium influx with EC_{50} of 1.7 micromolar in mouse neocortical neurons

VGSC have at least six neurotoxic sites that act as targets for small molecules. By using a radioligand probe [3H]BTX known to bind to neurotoxic site two on the VGSC alpha subunit, a group found that hoiamide A must bind to site two as well, given its inhibition of [3H]BTX. A full agonist of VGSC site two, batrachotoxin, was then used to determine to what extent hoiamide A acted as an agonist. The experiments demonstrated that hoiamide A is a partial agonist because the maximum sodium influx hoiamide A binding caused was less than that of batrachotoxin.

Another study found that hoiamide A stimulated capspase-3 activity, lactic acid dehydrogenase efflux, and nuclear condensation. These processes are specifically and uniquely involved in necrosis and apoptosis, suggesting that hoiamide A is involved neuronal death by both necrosis and apoptosis.

=== Hoiamide B ===
Like hoiamide A, hoiamide B stimulated sodium influx in mouse neocortical neurons with an EC_{50} value of 3.9 micromolar. Because hoiamide B is so structurally similar to hoiamide A, research currently predicts that B is also a site 2 VGSC inhibitor.

Though the mechanism of inhibition of calcium oscillations in mouse neocortical neurons is unknown for hoiamide A and B, both compounds potently suppress spontaneous calcium oscillations with EC50 values of 45.6 and 79.8 nanomolar, respectively.

=== Hoiamide C ===
Hoiamide C exhibits a LC_{50} of 1.3 micromolar in brine shrimp toxicity assays. However, it does not disrupt spontaneous calcium ion oscillations.

Because ethanol is used in storage of biological material, it is possible that hoiamide C may be an extraction artifact of hoiamide D.

=== Hoiamide D ===
p53 protein is a well known tumor suppressor that regulates the cell cycle, DNA repair, and apoptosis by acting as a transcription factor. MDM2 is a murine ubiquitin ligase that downregulates p52 by various mechanisms. The binding surface of the two proteins is small, and the interaction is hydrophobic. Through an assay that made available the p53/MDM2 complex, hoiamide D was found to inhibit the activity of the interaction.

== Potential therapeutic applications ==
As partial agonists of VGSC, hoiamide A and B may be able to mimic activity-dependent control of neuronal development through the up-regulation of pathways that influence neuronal growth and plasticity.

Hoiamide D is a molecule that may have applications as a precursor molecule for cancer therapies.
