= Jamaicamide A =

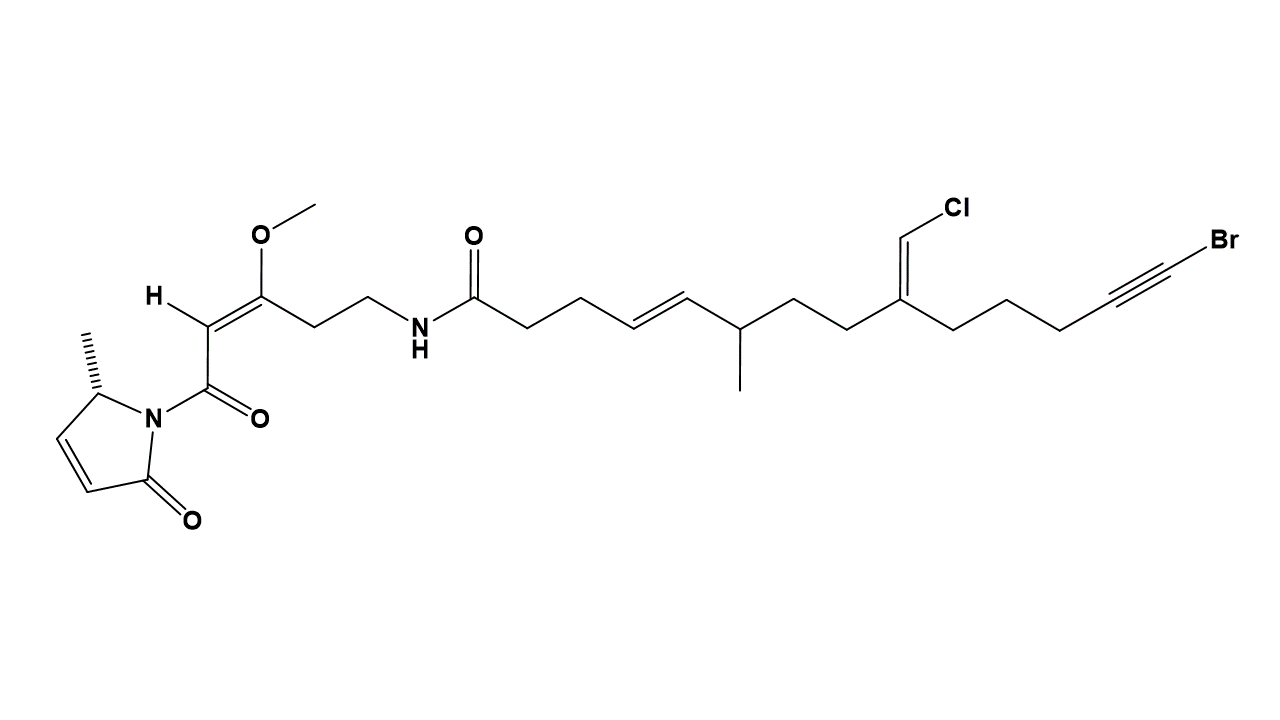

Names
- Preferred IUPAC name (E,9E)-14-bromo-9-(chloromethylidene)-N-[(E)-3-methoxy-5-(2-methyl-5-oxo-2H-pyrrol-1-yl)-5-oxopent-3-enyl]-6-methyltetradec-4-en-13-ynamide

Identifiers
CAS Number	373641-52-2
3D model (JSmol)	Interactive image; Interactive image; Interactive image
ChEBI	CHEBI:81589
ChemSpider	28295601
KEGG	C15826
PubChem CID	21589265
CompTox Dashboard (EPA)	DTXSID301046696
- InChI: Key: NAIKIJSSBJHCBL-IPUGVWFUSA-N; InChI=1S/C27H36BrClN2O4/c1-21(12-14-23(20-29)10-5-4-8-17-28)9-6-7-11-25(32)30-18-16-24(35-3)19-27(34)31-22(2)13-15-26(31)33/h6,9,13,15,19-22H,4-5,7,10-12,14,16,18H2,1-3H3,(H,30,32)/b9-6+,23-20+,24-19+
- SMILES: CC1C=CC(=O)N1C(=O)C=C(CCNC(=O)CCC=CC(C)CCC(=CCl)CCCC#CBr)OC; CC1C=CC(=O)N1C(=O)/C=C(\CCNC(=O)CC/C=C/C(C)CC/C(=C/Cl)/CCCC#CBr)/OC; CO/C(=C/C(=O)N1C(=O)C=C[C@@H]1C)CCNC(=O)CC/C=C/C(C)CC/C(=C/Cl)CCCC#CBr

Properties
Chemical formula	C_{27}H_{36}BrClNO_{4}
Molar mass	553.94 g·mol^{−1}
- Except where otherwise noted, data are given for materials in their standard state (at 25 °C [77 °F], 100 kPa). verify (what is ?) Infobox references

Jamaicamide A is a lipopeptide isolated from the cyanobacterium Moorea producens, formerly known as Lyngbya majuscula. Jamaicamide A belongs to a family of compounds collectively called jamaicamides, which are sodium channel blockers with potent neurotoxicity in a cellular model. Jamaicamide A has several unusual functionalities, including an alkynyl bromide, vinyl chloride, β-methoxy eneone system, and pyrrolinone ring.

== History ==
Jamaicamide A was discovered by William H. Gerwick from Oregon State University, Corvallis, Oregon, USA. This natural product was isolated from a dark green strain of Moorea producens, formerly known as Lyngbya majuscula, marine cyanobacteria collected from Hector Bay, Jamaica. The initial small amount of crude extract has shown potent brine shrimp toxicity. The organism was cultured in the laboratory, producing ten g/l of biomass after six weeks. The compound was extracted using standard methods for lipid natural products, and the fractionation process was performed using vacuum liquid chromatography (VLC).

Jamaicamide A exhibited moderate in vitro cytotoxicity to H-460 human lung and Neuro-2a mouse neuroblastoma cell lines with an IC50 value of 15 μM for both cell lines. This compound also displayed low micromolar inhibition of sodium channel-blocking activity at 5 μM. In a goldfish toxicity assay, compared with other Jamaicamides such as Jamaicamide B and C, Jamaicamide A has the least active fish toxin (sublethal toxicity at 10 ppm after 90 min), and neither showed significant brine shrimp toxicity.

== Biosynthesis ==
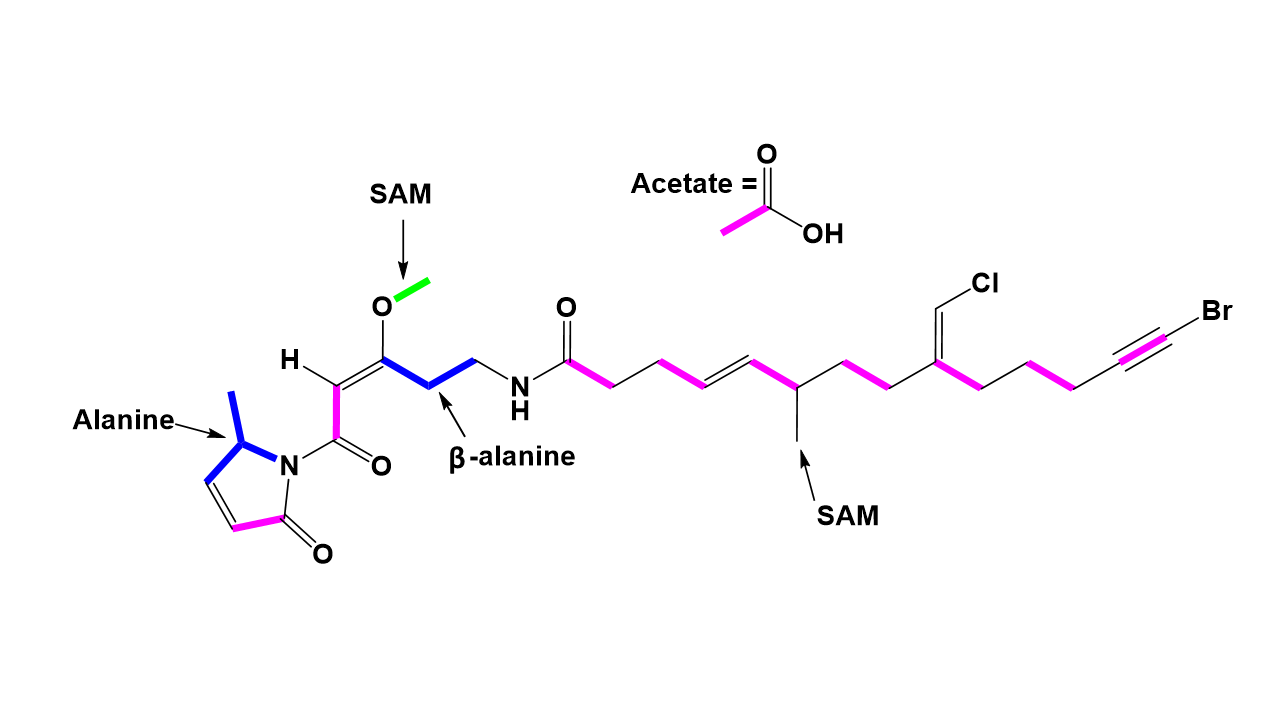
Biosynthetic precursors of jamaicamide A

It has been predicted that jamaicamide A's biosynthetic pathways are from a hybrid polyketide synthase-nonribosomal peptide synthetase (PKS-NRPS) assembly units. Jamaicamide A is a popetides with a colinear arrangement with a chemical structure that suggests it is derived from various polyketides (9 acetate units), amino acids (L-Ala and β-Ala), and methionine-derived methyl groups. Nevertheless, it has distinctive molecular features like the terminal alkynyl bromide, vinyl chloride, and pyrrolinone ring. The biosynthetic origins and mechanism of formation of the pyrrolinone ring system are unknown.

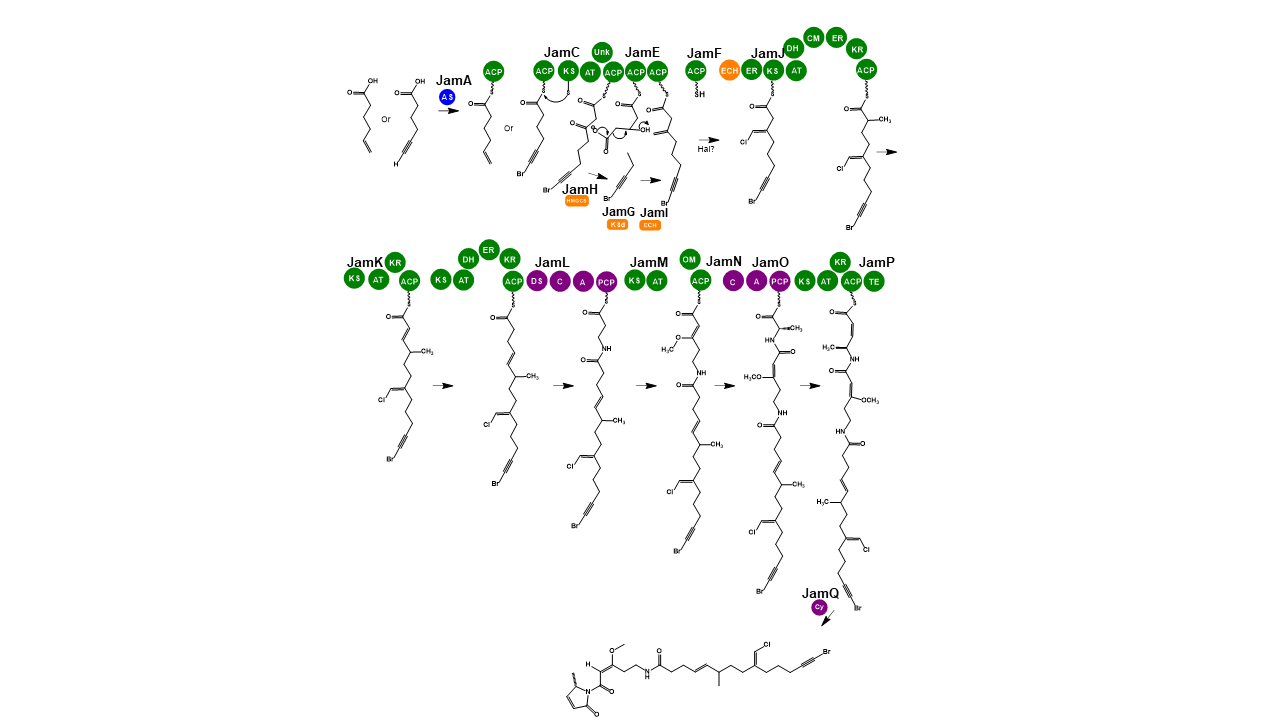
Proposed biosynthesis of jamaicamide A adapted from Edwards, D. J. et al. 2004

The first proposed biosynthesis of jamaicamide A published in 2004. Another proposed biosynthesis of jamaicamide A was published in 2006.
