= Debromoaplysiatoxin =

- Debromoaplysiatoxin

Names
- IUPAC name (1S,3R,4S,5S,9R,13S,14R)-13-Hydroxy-9-[(1R)-1-hydroxyethyl]-3-[(2S,5S)-5-(3-hydroxyphenyl)-5-methoxypentan-2-yl]-4,14,16,16-tetramethyl-2,6,10,17-tetraoxatricyclo[11.3.1.1^{1},^{5}]octadecane-7,11-dione

Identifiers
CAS Number	52423-28-6
3D model (JSmol)	Interactive image
Beilstein Reference	4624539
ChemSpider	4509004
KEGG	C05148
PubChem CID	5352033
CompTox Dashboard (EPA)	DTXSID80880084
- InChI: InChI=1S/C32H48O10/c1-18(11-12-24(38-7)22-9-8-10-23(34)13-22)29-20(3)26-16-32(41-29)30(5,6)15-19(2)31(37,42-32)17-28(36)39-25(21(4)33)14-27(35)40-26/h8-10,13,18-21,24-26,29,33-34,37H,11-12,14-17H2,1-7H3/t18-,19+,20-,21+,24-,25+,26?,29+,31-,32-/m0/s1
- SMILES: [C@@]123O[C@]([C@H](C)CC1(C)C)(CC(O[C@@]([C@@H](C)O)(CC(OC(C2)[C@H](C)[C@](O3)([C@H](CC[C@@H](C=4C=CC=C(C4)O)OC)C)[H])=O)[H])=O)O

Properties
Chemical formula	C_{32}H_{48}O_{10}
Molar mass	592.726 g·mol^{−1}
Appearance	White powder
Density	1.2±0.1 g/cm^{3}
Solubility in water	0.00911 mg/mL
log P	4.2
Vapor pressure	0.0±2.7 mmHg
Acidity (pK_{a})	9.36
Basicity (pK_{b})	−3

Hazards
- Occupational safety and health (OHS/OSH)
Main hazards	Carcinogenic, dermitis, oral and gastrointestinal inflammations
Flash point	239.0±26.4 °C
- Except where otherwise noted, data are given for materials in their standard state (at 25 °C [77 °F], 100 kPa). Infobox references

Debromoaplysiatoxin is a toxic agent produced by the blue-green alga Lyngbya majuscula. This alga lives in marine waters and causes seaweed dermatitis. Furthermore, it is a tumor promoter which has an anti-proliferative activity against various cancer cell lines in mice.

== History ==
The first reported case of seaweed dermatitis was from 1958 in Hawaii on Oahu island. About 125 people who had been swimming in the sea suffered from symptoms like itching, burning, blisters, rash and desquamation. The causative substance of this seaweed dermatitis was not known util 1968, when people in Okinawa, Japan, suffered from the same symptoms as the people in Hawaii. After researchers took samples in 1973 from Lyngbya majuscula, they found the causative agent of the dermatitis.

In 1980, there was a new outbreak of seaweed dermatitis on Oahu island Hawaii. Samples of L. majuscula revealed that this blue-green alga contained a mixture of aplysiatoxin, debromoaplysiatoxin and lyngbyatoxin A. These three substances appeared to be the causative toxins of seaweed dermatitis.

Years later, in 1994, local people of Hawaii, Maui and Oahu island in Hawaii were poisoned by food. The local residents of these islands often eat various types of algae including the red alga Gracilaria coronopifolia. After taking samples of this red alga it turned out that they contained two toxins which were identical with aplysiatoxin and debromoaplysiatoxin. Moreover, they observed parasitism of a blue-green alga on the surface of G. coronopifolia. As some blue-green alga like L. majuscula produce aplysiatoxin and debromoaplysiatoxin, it's probable that they are the true origin of this food poisoning case.

== Synthesis ==
Because of the sterically complex and particular molecular structure, debromoaplysiatoxin is an attractive target for total synthesis. This compound combines spiro acetal, hemiacetal and diolide functionalities, which result in peculiar biological activities. To this date, only Yoshito Kishi's approach to synthesize debromoaplysiatoxin from scratch was found to be effective.

At first, a specific sulfone is formed in 22 steps of common chemistry. This sulfone is coupled with a straightforward epoxide that originates from optically active starting materials. This coupling reaction is most efficient when the sulfone is transformed into a dianion with n-butyllithium, followed by exposure to the epoxide. Hereby, a diastereomeric mixture of sulfones is formed. After reductive desulfurization and methylation, the formation of a cyclohexylidene side group can be achieved. This intermediate can be converted into a terminal epoxide by usage of classical synthetical operations, such as introducing acetic acid or substitution reactions with tosylates. Next, a dithiane derived anion interacts to form an alcohol.

The following step involves introducing an acidic sidechain on the C9 hydroxyl group. This carboxylic, acidic side group is made of xylose and arabidose. The introduction is realized by protecting the C29 and C30 hydroxyl groups with respectively p-methoxybenzyl (MPM) and benzyloxymethyl (BOM), activating the sidechain with acid chloride, and subsequently replacing the C30 protecting group with a more stable one, tert-butyldiphenylsilyl (TBDPS). Thereafter, the carboxylic acid can successfully attach to the backbone by esterification. In order to produce the primary alcohol, it is necessary to adjust the protecting group of the C30 once again, back to BOM.

Although it would seem more logical to esterify the C29 with a Blaise reaction first, the yield of this idea has shown to be insufficient. Therefore, the β-keto thioester is formed out of the alcohol by a quadruplet of reactions with respectively N,N′-dicyclohexylcarbodiimide (DCC), N-chlorosuccinimide (NCS), sodium chlorite and 1,1'-carbonyldiimidazole (CDI). With 2,3-dichloro-5,6-dicyano-1,4-benzoquinone (DDQ) treatment, this β-keto thioester can be converted into an unstable diol, which is the acyclic precursor of the end product.

In order to introduce the ring system that characterizes debromoaplysiotoxin in this molecule, hemiketal formation must be achieved between the C7 ketone and the C11 hydroxy group, after which lactone formation can seal the deal. This can be achieved by a method called macrolactonization.

== Mechanism of action ==
Debromoaplysiatoxin has two effects on cell-growth: it has a tumor-promoting-activity as well as an anti-proliferation activity. Therefore, this compound is of interest for study: by finding which groups cause the tumor-promoting activity, and removing them, the new compound will only have an anti-proliferation activity, and can be used as a therapy for cancer. The methoxy-group is found to be a cause for the tumor-promoting activity, and removal of the methoxy-group causes the antiproliferation activity to increase, without changing the tumor-promoting activity. Studies with analogs of debromoaplysiatoxin show that the hemi-acetal hydroxy group at position 3 and/or the methoxy group at position 15 in debromoaplysiatoxin would be responsible for the tumor-promoting activity.

The activation of protein kinase C (PKC) is likely to be responsible for the antiproliferative and tumor-promoting activities of aplysiatoxin-related compounds. Tumor promoters like PDBu and ATX bound potently to the C1 domains of both conventional and novel PKCs, while antiproliferative compounds such as aplog-1 and bryo-1 exhibited some selectivity for novel PKCs other than PKCε, that is, PKCδ, PKCη, and PKCθ. The affinity of DAT for the PKC C1 domains is quite similar to that of aplysiatoxin. The introduction of a methylgroup group into position 4 could enhance the affinity for conventional PKCs rather than for novel PKCs, and the introduction of a methyl group into position 10 would enhance the affinity for both conventional and novel PKCs. Activation of PKCα is suggested to be involved in cancer cell growth, and PKCδ to play a tumor suppressor role and to be involved in apoptosis.

== Available forms ==
Aplog-1, a simple and less hydrophobic analog of aplysiatoxin, is a PKC ligand with little tumor-promoting activity that showed growth-inhibitory activities against several cancer cell lines. Multiple derivatives were evaluated for their antiproliferative activity against several human cancer cell lines and binding activity for PKCδ, which plays a tumor suppressor role and is involved in apoptosis. The results showed that the dimethyl groups at position 6 are indispensable to these activities, but that the hydroxyl group at position 18 is not necessary. Of note, the more hydrophobic 12,12-dimethyl-aplog-1 did not show any tumor-promoting activity in vitro or in vivo. These results suggest that hydrophobicity around the spiroketal moiety of aplog-1 would enhance antiproliferative activities but not tumor-promoting activity. The antiproliferative activities of the analogs to not simply depend on molecular hydrophobicity, and the local hydrophobicity around position 10 plays an important role in enhancing antiproliferative activities. Because the analogues possess the skeleton of tumor-promoting aplysiatoxin and debromoaplysiatoxin, the adverse effects would be most likely tumor promotion.

== Toxicity ==
Debromoaplysiatoxin has activity against P-388 mouse lymphatic leukaemia and was found to cause dermatitis. It has been found to be active at concentrations of 0.005 nmol per ear. The compound was first isolated from the digestive tract of the sea hare Stylocheilus longicauda. Accidental skin contact with sea hare toxin extract led to skin irritations. This phenolic bislactones has been shown to have potent tumor promoting activities. Debromoaplysiatoxin produces erythema, blisters and necrosis.

The dehydrated anhydrotoxins of debromoaplysiatoxin are relatively nontoxic. Examination of the structure–activity relationship (SAR) of this hydrophobic region showed that the absence of the brominated molecule in moieties of Lyngbya toxins reduced malignant transformation and DNA synthesis in cells.

== Effects on animals ==
The response of animals to debromoaplysiatoxin is variable. For example, the response of mice with P-388 lymphocytic leukemia to injections of debromoaplysiatoxin. The result was that the mice had good antileukemia response after treatment with debromoaplysiatoxin. The disadvantage was that these responses were only measured by a dose at which nearly 50 percent of the mice died of toxicity (LD_{50}).

Toxicity of aplysiatoxin and debromoaplysiatoxin from G. coronopifolia against mice is also shown in Table 1. Aplysiatoxin was twice as toxic to mice as debromoaplysiatoxin. The characteristic symptom of these toxins in mice was diarrhea, which usually occurred 30 minutes after injection of toxins. Lethargy (a state of tiredness, weariness, fatigue, or lack of energy), muscular contractions and sometimes hind leg paralysis were observed. Death was observed by 1.2 g of each algae in the mouse toxicity assay.

Furthermore, scientists speculate that debromoaplysiatoxin is accumulated in marine organisms by trophic transfer. In particular, trophic transfer of debromoaplysiatoxin from L. majuscula into Stylocheilus striatus (a sea slug) has been established. This indicates that the compound isn't excreted by the animals causing a higher risk of death related to the amount of food consumed by the animal and its age.

Also, dermal diseases in the manatee population is likely to be caused by exposure to Lyngbya. The algal mat samples collected from manatee dorsum were dominated by Lyngbya spp. Other algae were present in very low quantities and varied in composition. Lyngbya-dominated mats were also collected from the walls of manatee holding tanks. Manatee feces was sampled from the anal opening and debromoaplysiatoxin was identified in multiple samples, proving the exposure of manatees to Lyngbya toxins. It is highly plausible that dermal disease in the manatee population is linked with exposure to Lyngbyatoxins. In contrast to humans who would likely have periodic exposure to Lyngbya while swimming, Lyngbya growing on the dorsa of manatees would cause 24 h per day exposure to the toxin. It may be hypothesized that the continual presence of these toxin-producing cyanobacteria on the skin of these clinically ill animals may be contributing to their dermatologic disease. (5)

In rabbits and hairless mice, topical application of debromoaplysiatoxin produced severe cutaneous inflammatory reactions. DAT produces dermatitis on the murine ear at a very low dose. This inflammation response and the mechanism of tumor promotion is likely to be mediated through activation of calcium activated, phospholipid-dependent protein kinase C.

In the aplysiatoxin class, debromoaplysiatoxin, aplysiatoxin, and 19-bromoaplysiatoxin have been found to be tumor promoters in mouse skin. Also, rat tracheal cells in culture are sensitive indicators for the presence of the polyacetates, aplysiatoxin and debromoaplysiatoxin. It causes increase in colony formation and is in agreement with a proliferative activation ('triggering') of the basal cell population from the normally quiescent Go state found in intact tracheal epithelium. The results also suggest that the polyacetates are good candidates for tumor promoters in vivo.
