= Laucysteinamide A =

- Chemical structure of laucysteinamide A

Names
- Preferred IUPAC name (12E)-N-Methyl-13-[(2R)-2-methyl-4,5-dihydro-1,3-thiazol-4-yl]-N-[(1E)-penta-1,4-dien-1-yl]tridec-12-enamide

Identifiers
CAS Number	2255376-67-9
3D model (JSmol)	Interactive image
ChemSpider	61708464
PubChem CID	146683783
CompTox Dashboard (EPA)	DTXSID601046619
- InChI: InChI=1S/C23H38N2OS/c1-4-5-16-19-25(3)23(26)18-15-13-11-9-7-6-8-10-12-14-17-22-20-27-21(2)24-22/h4,14,16-17,19,22H,1,5-13,15,18,20H2,2-3H3/b17-14+,19-16+/t22-/m1/s1 Key: AYRWEQNQZDTIDT-GIWCFZTQSA-N
- SMILES: CC1=N[C@@H](CS1)/C=C/CCCCCCCCCCC(=O)N(C)/C=C/CC=C

Properties
Chemical formula	C_{23}H_{38}N_{2}OS
Molar mass	390.63 g·mol^{−1}
- Except where otherwise noted, data are given for materials in their standard state (at 25 °C [77 °F], 100 kPa). Infobox references

Laucysteinamide A (LcA) is a marine natural product isolated from a cyanobacterium, Caldora penicillata.

It is structurally related to other marine cyanobacterial metabolites such as somocystinamide A and curacin A, which have inspired extensive investigations into their use as a lead for anticancer therapies. Its biological activity profile has not been fully evaluated due to decomposition of the natural sample. However, it has shown moderate cytotoxicity against H460 human lung cancer cells.

In order to examine the possibility that LcA's true bioactivity was diminished by solubility issues, Taylor et al. chemically synthesized LcA. This synthetic sample was incorporated into an emulsifier PEG400 and tested for its cytotoxicity against H460 cells. This sample did not show any more activity than the natural sample, implying that LcA only has moderate cytotoxicity. In addition, simple enamide analogs showed no activity. This work implies that the exceptional antiproliferative activity of somocystinamide A arises from the dimeric nature of its structure and not from the enamide moiety.

== See also ==
- Caldoramide
