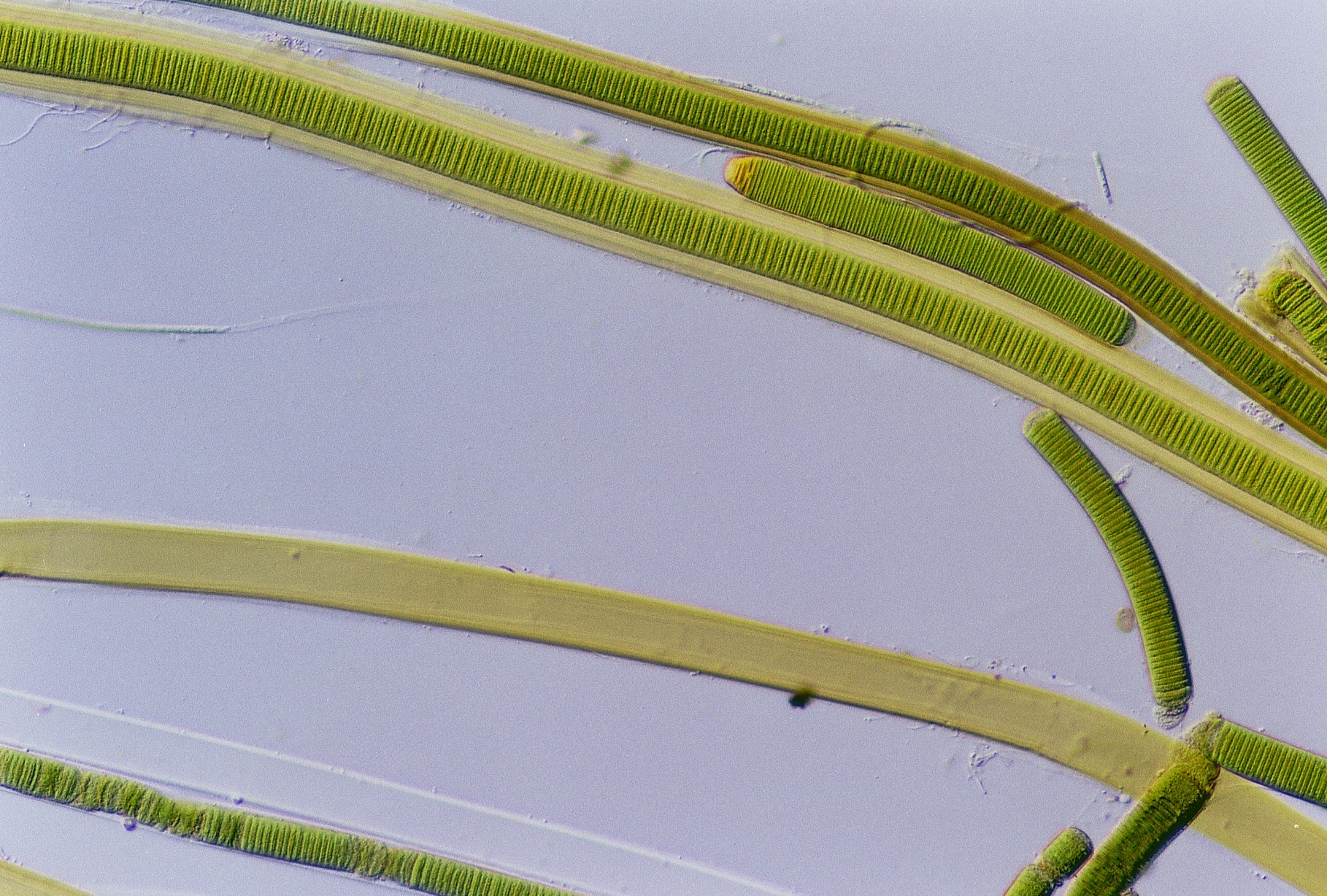
- Lyngbya sp.

Scientific classification
- Domain: Bacteria
- Kingdom: Bacillati
- Phylum: Cyanobacteriota
- Class: Cyanophyceae
- Order: Oscillatoriales
- Family: Oscillatoriaceae
- Genus: Lyngbya; Agardh Ex Gomont, 1892

Species
- Lyngbya aestuarii; Lyngbya bouillonii; Lyngbya confervoides; Lyngbya hieronymusii; Lyngbya kuetzingii; Lyngbya majuscula; Lyngbya polychroa; Lyngbya semiplena

= Lyngbya =

Genus of bacteria

Lyngbya is a genus of cyanobacteria, unicellular autotrophs that form the basis of the oceanic food chain.

As a result of recent genetic analyses, several new genera were erected from this genus: e.g., Moorea, Limnoraphis, Okeania, Microseira, and Dapis.

Lyngbya species form long, unbranching filaments inside a rigid mucilaginous sheath. Sheaths may form tangles or mats, intermixed with other phytoplankton species. They reproduce asexually. Their filaments break apart and each cell forms a new filament. The mats grow around atolls, salt marshes, or fresh water.

Some Lyngbya species cause the human skin irritation called seaweed dermatitis.

Some Lyngbya species can also temporarily monopolize aquatic ecosystems when they form dense, floating mats in the water.

Ingestion of Lyngbya is potentially lethal. Most commonly, poisoning is caused by eating fish which have fed on Lyngbya or which have fed on other fish which have consumed Lyngbya. This is called "ciguatera-like" poisoning.

== See also ==
- Lyngbyastatins
- Lyngbyatoxin-a
