= Caldoramide =

Identifiers
CAS Number	1961308-67-7
3D model (JSmol)	Interactive image
ChemSpider	58197046
PubChem CID	132525321
UNII	9QZW82STF4
- InChI: InChI=1S/C37H59N5O6/c1-22(2)19-28(35(45)42-27(29(48-13)21-30(42)43)20-26-17-15-14-16-18-26)40(11)37(47)33(25(7)8)41(12)36(46)31(23(3)4)38-34(44)32(24(5)6)39(9)10/h14-18,21-25,27-28,31-33H,19-20H2,1-13H3,(H,38,44)/t27-,28-,31-,32-,33-/m0/s1 Key: XMIMMOXGNBQXIJ-VLQZMBLPSA-N
- SMILES: CC(C)CC(C(=O)N1C(C(=CC1=O)OC)CC2=CC=CC=C2)N(C)C(=O)C(C(C)C)N(C)C(=O)C(C(C)C)NC(=O)C(C(C)C)N(C)C

Properties
Chemical formula	C_{37}H_{59}N_{5}O_{6}
Molar mass	669.908 g·mol^{−1}
- Except where otherwise noted, data are given for materials in their standard state (at 25 °C [77 °F], 100 kPa). Infobox references

Caldoramide is a pentapeptide isolated from the cyanobacteria Caldora penicillata. It has cytotoxic effects on cancer cells and has been the subject of extensive oncological research. It is structurally analogous to belamide A and dolastatin 15. Its appearance is that of a powdery, white, substance.

== Structure ==
The N-terminus for Caldoramide is N,N-dimethylvaline which is attached to a valine which is attached to an N-Me-valine connected to an N-Me-isoleucine which is attached to the C-terminus. The molecule can also be written as N,N-diMe-Val-Val-N-Me-Val-N-Me-Ile-3-O-Me-4-benzylpyrrolinone.

== Extraction ==
Freeze-dried samples of Caldora penicillata had EtOAc−MeOH and H_{2}O−EtOH applied to them in order to extract Caldoramide. The extracts were partitioned with n-BuOH and H_{2}O and then fractions were taken based on solubility in either EtOAc or BuOH. Caldoramide was extracted from the BuOH soluble fraction.

== Pharmacological activity ==
Caldoramide has been found to be cytotoxic against HCT116 colorectal cancer cell lines.

== See also ==
- Laucysteinamide A
