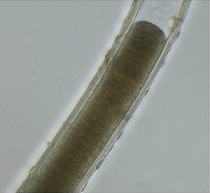

Scientific classification
- Domain: Bacteria
- Kingdom: Bacillati
- Phylum: Cyanobacteriota
- Class: Cyanophyceae
- Order: Oscillatoriales
- Family: Oscillatoriaceae
- Genus: Moorea
- Species: M. producens

Binomial name
- Moorea producens Engene & Tronholm 2019

= Moorea producens =

Species of bacterium

Moorea producens is a species of filamentous cyanobacteria in the genus Moorea, including tropical marine strains formerly classified as Lyngbya majuscula due to morphological resemblance but separated based on genetic evidence. Moorea producens grows on seagrass and is one of the causes of the human skin irritation seaweed dermatitis. It is known as fireweed in Australia and stinging limu in Hawaii.

== Taxonomy ==
Moorea producens was first described in 2012, but the name was not validly published. It was redescribed in 2019 validly with the authority Eugene and Tronholm.

== Description ==
The prevalence of this organism appears to be on the increase due to pollution and overfishing. Nutrients such as nitrogen and human waste flow to the ocean due to rain and sewage runoff; these added nutrients increase the population of microbes, which in turn remove oxygen from the water. Reduced numbers of fish to eat the microbes further enhances the microbe populations. Cyanobacteria are evolutionarily optimized for environmental conditions of low oxygen. M. producta is non-diazotrophic.

Moorea producens is known for its toxicity, producing Lyngbyatoxin-a and other "antifungal and cytotoxic agents, including laxaphycin A and B and curacin A."

A major outbreak occurred in Darwin Harbour in May- June 2010.
