= 2-Aminothiazoline-4-carboxylic acid =

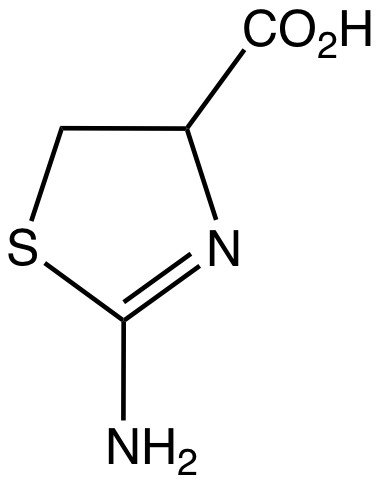

Names
- Preferred IUPAC name 2-Amino-4,5-dihydro-1,3-thiazole-4-carboxylic acid
- Other names ACTA

Identifiers
CAS Number	2150-55-2
3D model (JSmol)	Interactive image
ChEBI	CHEBI:64777
ChemSpider	15666
ECHA InfoCard	100.016.758
EC Number	218-433-0
PubChem CID	16526
UNII	48431VN59G
CompTox Dashboard (EPA)	DTXSID9024510
- InChI: InChI=1S/C4H6N2O2S/c5-4-6-2(1-9-4)3(7)8/h2H,1H2,(H2,5,6)(H,7,8) Key: VHPXSBIFWDAFMB-UHFFFAOYSA-N
- SMILES: C1C(N=C(S1)N)C(=O)O

Properties
Chemical formula	C_{4}H_{6}N_{2}O_{2}S
Molar mass	146.16 g·mol^{−1}
Appearance	White solid
Melting point	212 °C (414 °F; 485 K)
- Except where otherwise noted, data are given for materials in their standard state (at 25 °C [77 °F], 100 kPa). Infobox references

2-Aminothiazoline-4-carboxylic acid (ACTA) is the organosulfur compound and a heterocycle with the formula HO_{2}CCHCH_{2}SCNH_{2}N. This derivative of thiazoline is an intermediate in the industrial synthesis of L-cysteine, an amino acid. ACTA exists in equilibrium with its tautomer 2-iminothiazolidine-4-carboxylic acid.

It is produced by the reaction of methyl chloroacrylate with thiourea. It is also a biomarker for cyanide poisoning, as it results from the condensation of cysteine and cyanide.
