= Methyl 2-chloroacrylate =

Names
- Preferred IUPAC name Methyl 2-chloroprop-2-enoate
- Other names *2-Chloro-2-propenoic acid, methyl ester: 2-Chloroacrylic acid methyl ester; 2-Chloroacrylic acid, methyl ester; 2-Propenoic acid, 2-chloro-, methyl ester; Acrylic acid, 2-chloro-, methyl ester; Methyl 2-chloro-2-propenoate; Methyl 2-chloropropenoate; Methyl alpha-chloroacrylate; Methyl-alpha-chloroacrylate; Propenoic acid, 2-chloro-, methyl ester

Identifiers
CAS Number	80-63-7
3D model (JSmol)	Interactive image
ChemSpider	6407
ECHA InfoCard	100.001.181
EC Number	201-298-7
PubChem CID	6659
UNII	47PG4L077J
UN number	2929 (METHYL 2-CHLOROACRYLATE)
CompTox Dashboard (EPA)	DTXSID4025585
- InChI: InChI=1S/C4H5ClO2/c1-3(5)4(6)7-2/h1H2,2H3 Key: AWJZTPWDQYFQPQ-UHFFFAOYSA-N
- SMILES: COC(=O)C(=C)Cl

Properties
Chemical formula	C_{4}H_{5}ClO_{2}
Molar mass	120.53 g·mol^{−1}
Appearance	Colorless liquid
Density	1.189 g/cm^{3} at 68 °F (20 °C)
Boiling point	52 °C; 126 °F; 325 K at 51.0 mmHg
Solubility in water	Insoluble in water

Hazards
- GHS labelling
Pictograms	(GHS02: Flammable) (GHS05: Corrosive) (GHS06: Toxic)
Signal word	Danger
Hazard statements	H226, H301, H311, H314, H330
Precautionary statements	P210, P233, P240, P241, P242, P243, P260, P262, P264, P264+P265, P270, P271, P280, P284, P301+P316, P301+P330+P331, P302+P352, P302+P361+P354, P303+P361+P353, P304+P340, P305+P354+P338, P316, P317, P320, P321, P330, P361+P364, P363, P370+P378, P403+P233, P403+P235, P405, P501
- Except where otherwise noted, data are given for materials in their standard state (at 25 °C [77 °F], 100 kPa). Infobox references

Methyl 2-chloroacrylate is a colorless liquid used in manufacture of acrylic high polymer similar to polymethylmethacrylate. It is also used as a monomer for certain specialty polymers.

Methyl 2-chloroacrylate is polymerizable, insoluble in water, and a skin, eye, and lung irritant. Inhalation of vapors causes pulmonary edema. Trace amounts on the skin cause large blisters.

2-Aminothiazoline-4-carboxylic acid, an intermediate in the industrial synthesis of L-cysteine, is produced by the reaction of thiourea with methyl 2-chloroacrylate.
