= Aplysiatoxin =

Names
- Other names Aplysiatoxin

Identifiers
CAS Number	52659-57-1
3D model (JSmol)	Interactive image
ChEBI	CHEBI:87016
ChemSpider	10282349
PubChem CID	40465
CompTox Dashboard (EPA)	DTXSID60880082
- InChI: InChI=1S/C32H47BrO10/c1-17(8-11-24(39-7)22-12-21(35)9-10-23(22)33)29-19(3)26-15-32(42-29)30(5,6)14-18(2)31(38,43-32)16-28(37)40-25(20(4)34)13-27(36)41-26/h9-10,12,17-20,24-26,29,34-35,38H,8,11,13-16H2,1-7H3/t17-,18+,19-,20+,24-,25+,26-,29+,31-,32-/m0/s1 Key: RHJPBGWFGOAEID-BEDNPZBZSA-N; InChI=1/C32H47BrO10/c1-17(8-11-24(39-7)22-12-21(35)9-10-23(22)33)29-19(3)26-15-32(42-29)30(5,6)14-18(2)31(38,43-32)16-28(37)40-25(20(4)34)13-27(36)41-26/h9-10,12,17-20,24-26,29,34-35,38H,8,11,13-16H2,1-7H3/t17-,18+,19-,20+,24-,25+,26-,29+,31-,32-/m0/s1 Key: RHJPBGWFGOAEID-BEDNPZBZBK
- SMILES: C[C@@H](O)C(CC(O1)=O)OC(C[C@@]2(O)[C@H](C)CC(C)(C)[C@@]3(C[C@H]1[C@H](C)[C@@H]([C@@H](C)CCC(OC)C4=C(Br)C=CC(O)=C4)O3)O2)=O

Properties
Chemical formula	C_{32}H_{47}BrO_{10}
Molar mass	671.614
- Except where otherwise noted, data are given for materials in their standard state (at 25 °C [77 °F], 100 kPa). verify (what is ?) Infobox references

Aplysiatoxin is a cyanotoxin produced by certain cyanobacteria species. It is used as a defensive secretion to protect these cyanobacteria from predation by fish, being a potent irritant and carcinogen, by acting as a powerful activator of protein kinase C. While this action has a tumour-promoting effect, protein kinase C activation can be medically beneficial for some other applications, and synthetic analogues of aplysiatoxin have been researched for anti-cancer effects.

== See also ==
- Debromoaplysiatoxin
