= Dragomabin =

Identifiers
| CAS Number | (revised): 942039-60-3 |
| 3D model (JSmol) | (revised): Interactive image |
| ChEBI | (originally proposed): CHEBI:65583 |
| ChEMBL | (originally proposed): ChEMBL391000 |
| ChemSpider | (originally proposed): 20568904 |
| PubChem CID | (originally proposed): 16737469 |
| CompTox Dashboard (EPA) | DTXSID501045725 |
- InChI: (revised): InChI=1S/C37H51N5O6/c1-9-10-11-13-16-25(2)35(45)42(7)32(24-28-17-14-12-15-18-28)34(44)39-26(3)36(46)40(5)27(4)37(47)41(6)31(33(38)43)23-29-19-21-30(48-8)22-20-29/h1,12,14-15,17-22,25-27,31-32H,10-11,13,16,23-24H2,2-8H3,(H2,38,43)(H,39,44)/t25-,26+,27+,31+,32+/m1/s1 Key: JAYHQHZOWYDLDQ-WLVJZVJWSA-N
- SMILES: (revised): [C@@H](CC1=CC=CC=C1)(N(C([C@@H](CCCCC#C)C)=O)C)C(N[C@H](C(N([C@H](C(N([C@@H](CC2=CC=C(OC)C=C2)C(N)=O)C)=O)C)C)=O)C)=O

Properties
| Chemical formula | C_{37}H_{51}N_{5}O_{6} |
| Molar mass | 661.844 g·mol^{−1} |
- Except where otherwise noted, data are given for materials in their standard state (at 25 °C [77 °F], 100 kPa). Infobox references

Dragomabin is a lipopeptide isolated from the marine cyanobacteria Lyngbya majuscula. It has in vitro antimalarial activity. In 2018, a laboratory synthesis of dragomabin was reported. The synthesis identified a misassignment of the configuration of the stereogenic center on the alkyne-bearing fragment and it was revised from (S) to (R).
