= Lyngbyatoxin-a =

Names
- Systematic IUPAC name (2S,5S)-9-[(3R)-3,7-Dimethylocta-1,6-dien-3-yl]-5-(hydroxymethyl)-1-methyl-2-(propan-2-yl)-1,2,4,5,6,8-hexahydro-3H-[1,4]diazonino[7,6,5-cd]indol-3-one
- Other names Lyngbyatoxin-a

Identifiers
CAS Number	70497-14-2
3D model (JSmol)	Interactive image
ChemSpider	10472344
PubChem CID	91706
UNII	SE69L721CS
CompTox Dashboard (EPA)	DTXSID00972091 DTXSID90880015, DTXSID00972091
- InChI: InChI=1S/C27H39N3O2/c1-8-27(6,13-9-10-17(2)3)21-11-12-22-23-19(15-28-24(21)23)14-20(16-31)29-26(32)25(18(4)5)30(22)7/h8,10-12,15,18,20,25,28,31H,1,9,13-14,16H2,2-7H3,(H,29,32)/t20-,25-,27-/m0/s1 Key: KISDGNGREAJPQR-OICBGKIFSA-N; InChI=1/C27H39N3O2/c1-8-27(6,13-9-10-17(2)3)21-11-12-22-23-19(15-28-24(21)23)14-20(16-31)29-26(32)25(18(4)5)30(22)7/h8,10-12,15,18,20,25,28,31H,1,9,13-14,16H2,2-7H3,(H,29,32)/t20-,25-,27-/m0/s1 Key: KISDGNGREAJPQR-OICBGKIFBW
- SMILES: CN([C@H]1C(C)C)C2=C3C(NC=C3C[C@@H](CO)NC1=O)=C([C@](C=C)(C)CC/C=C(C)/C)C=C2

Properties
Chemical formula	C_{27}H_{39}N_{3}O_{2}
Molar mass	437.628 g·mol^{−1}
- Except where otherwise noted, data are given for materials in their standard state (at 25 °C [77 °F], 100 kPa). verify (what is ?) Infobox references

Lyngbyatoxin-a is a type of alkaloid cyanotoxin produced by certain cyanobacteria species, most notably Moorea producens (formerly classified as Lyngbya majuscula). It is produced as defense mechanism to ward off any would-be predators of the bacterium, being a potent blister agent as well as carcinogen. Low concentrations cause a common skin condition known as seaweed dermatitis.

== Biosynthesis ==
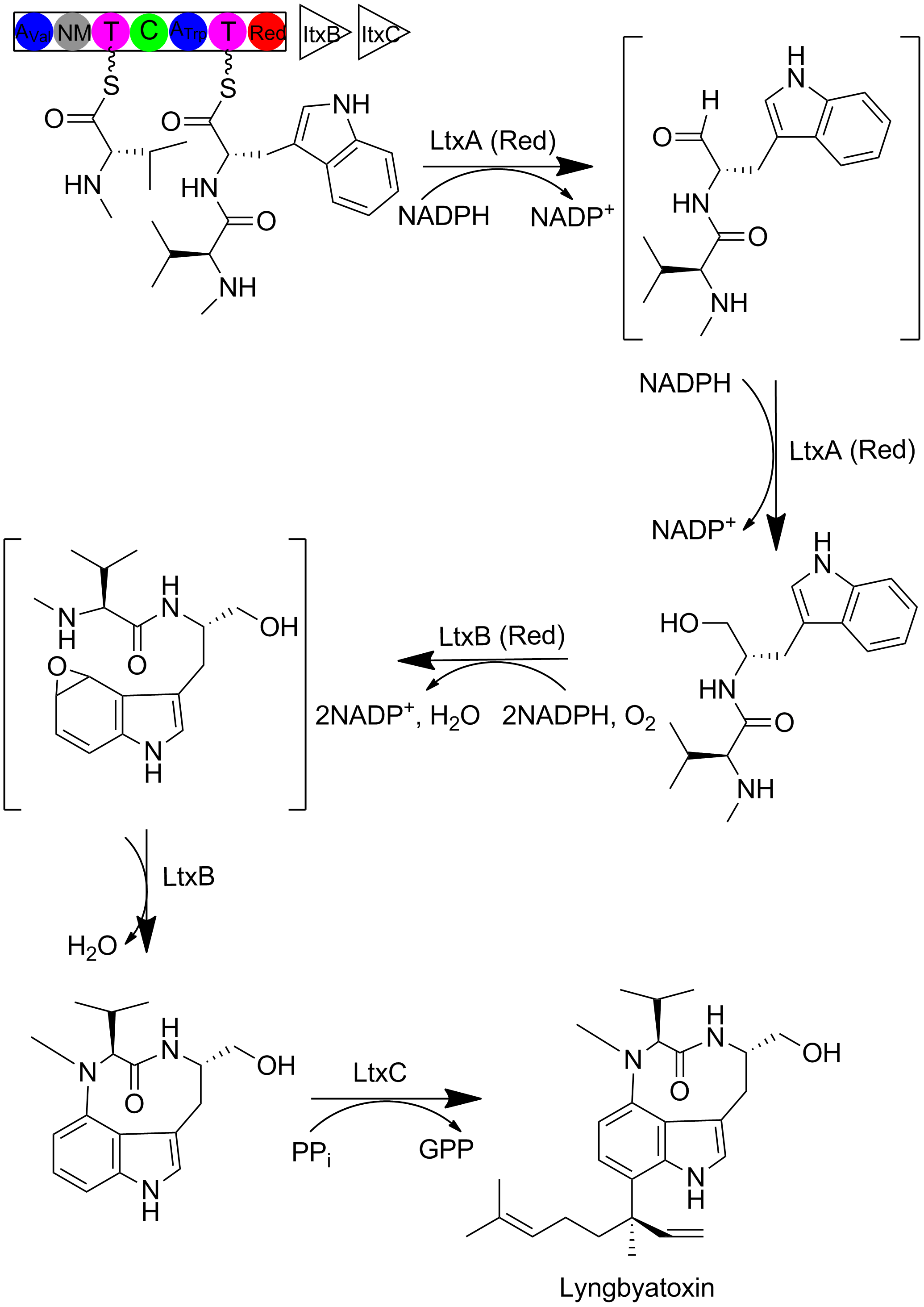
Lyngbyatoxin Biosynthesis reported by Gerwick et al. and Neilan et al.

Lyngbyatoxin is a terpenoid indole alkaloid hybrid that belongs to the class of non-ribosomal peptides (NRPs). Lyngbyatoxin contains a nucleophilic indole ring that takes part in the activation of protein kinases. Figure 1, shows the biosynthesis of Lyngbyatoxin reported by Neilan et al. and Gerwick et al. The non-ribosomal peptide synthase (NRPS) LtxA protein condenses L-methyl-valine and L-tryptophan to form the linear dipeptide N-methyl-L-valyl-L-tryptophan. The latter is released via a NADPH-dependent reductive cleavage to form the aldehyde which is subsequently reduced to the corresponding alcohol. A P450-dependent monooxygenase called LtxB then performs the oxidation and subsequent cyclization of N-methyl-L-valyl-L-tryptophan. Finally, LtxC transfers a geranyl functional group from geranyl pyrophosphate (GPP) to carbon number 7 of the indole ring.
