= Belamide A =

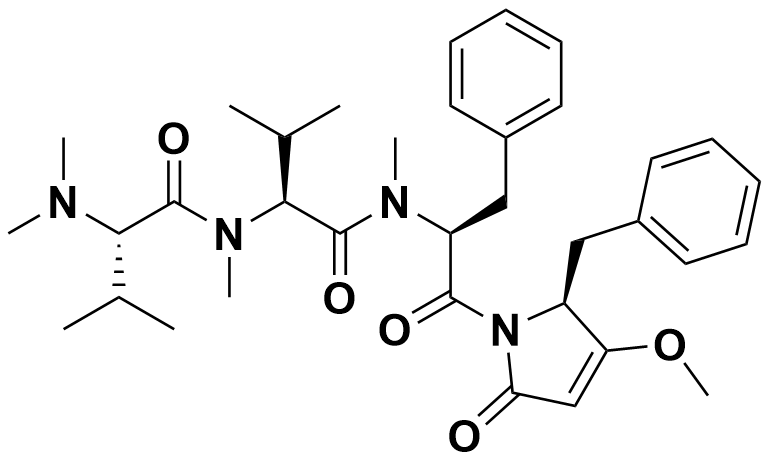

Names
- Preferred IUPAC name N,N-dimethylvalyl-N-methylvalyl-N-methylphenylalanyl-benzylmethoxypyrrolinone

Identifiers
3D model (JSmol)	Interactive image
ChEBI	CHEBI:208873
ChemSpider	9774471
PubChem CID	11599712
CompTox Dashboard (EPA)	DTXSID001335602
- InChI: Key: JMMZSASROFIHRA-KOUWNTBJSA-N; InChI=1S/C35H48N4O5/c1-23(2)31(36(5)6)34(42)38(8)32(24(3)4)35(43)37(7)28(21-26-18-14-11-15-19-26)33(41)39-27(29(44-9)22-30(39)40)20-25-16-12-10-13-17-25/h10-19,22-24,27-28,31-32H,20-21H2,1-9H3/t27-,28-,31-,32-/m0/s1
- SMILES: CC(C)[C@@H](C(=O)N(C)[C@@H](C(C)C)C(=O)N(C)[C@@H](CC1=CC=CC=C1)C(=O)N2[C@H](C(=CC2=O)OC)CC3=CC=CC=C3)N(C)C

Properties
Chemical formula	C_{35}H_{48}N_{4}O_{5}
Molar mass	604.8 g/mol
- Except where otherwise noted, data are given for materials in their standard state (at 25 °C [77 °F], 100 kPa). (what is ?) Infobox references

Belamide A is a marine natural product isolated from the cyanobacterium Symploca sp., collected in shallow waters off the coast of Panama. This compound is a highly methylated linear tetrapeptide and is a structural analogue of Dolastatin 10 and Dolastatin 15. Belamide A has antimitotic activity and moderate cytotoxicity against human cancer cell lines.

== History ==
Belamide A was first isolated and described in 2006 in the lab of William H. Gerwick from the Center for Marine Biotechnology and Biomedicine, Scripps Institution of Oceanography, University of California, San Diego, La Jolla, and the College of Pharmacy, Oregon State University, Corvallis, USA. This marine natural product was isolated from a Symploca sp and collected at Salmedina Reef, Portobelo, Panama on November 3, 2003.

== Structure ==
This marine natural product is a linear tetrapeptide with a molecular formula of C_{35}H_{48}N_{4}O_{5} and was determined by high-resolution mass spectrometry. The elucidation of the structure was performed using 1D and 2D NMR spectroscopy, which includes COSY, HSQC, and HMBC. Belamide A has N-dimethylvaline (N-terminus), N-methylvaline, N-methylphenylalanine, and benzyl-methoxypyrrolinone moiety (C-terminus).

== Biological activity ==
Belamide A disrupts the microtubule network in A-10 cells, causing interphase microtubule loss and abnormal mitotic spindle formation at 20 μM. Also it is a moderately potent cytotoxin to HCT-116 cells (IC50 0.74 μM).

== Total synthesis ==
In 2011, Lan and co-workers reported the first enantioselective total synthesis of Belamide A. The total synthesis was performed using a novel chiral building block, methyl tetramate derivative. The total synthesis allowed the seven-step synthesis of Belamide A in 23.8% overall yield, the structure and the absolute configuration were confirmed and compared to the natural products.
