= Lyngbyastatins =

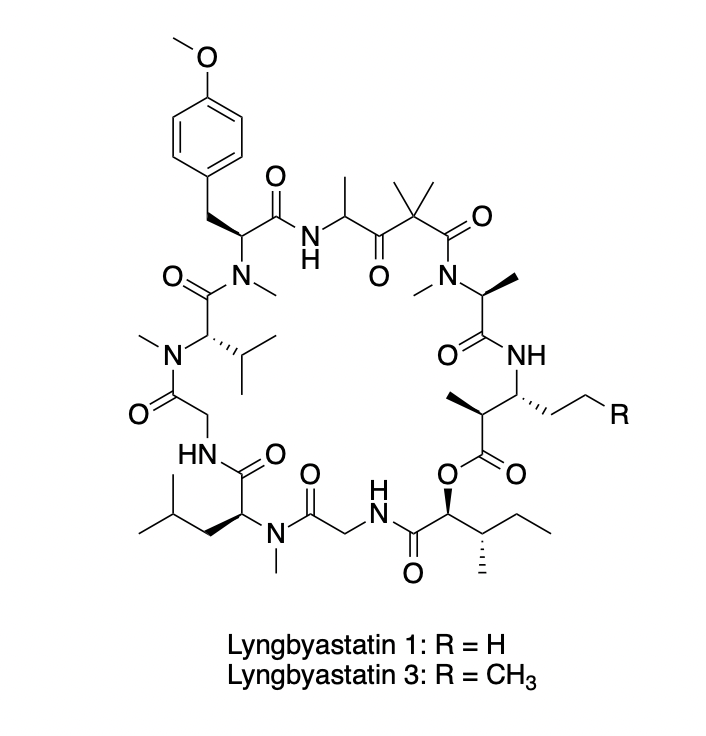

Names
- IUPAC names Lyngbyastatin 1: (2S,8S,14S,17S,25S,28R,29S)-2-((S)-sec-butyl)-28-ethyl-8-isobutyl-14-isopropyl-17-(4-methoxybenzyl)-7,13,16,20,22,22,24,25,29-nonamethyl-1-oxa-4,7,10,13,16,19,24,27-octaazacyclotriacontane-3,6,9,12,15,18,21,23,26,30-decaone Lyngbyastatin 3: (2S,8S,14S,17S,25S,28R,29S)-2-((S)-sec-butyl)-8-isobutyl-14-isopropyl-17-(4-methoxybenzyl)-7,13,16,20,22,22,24,25,29-nonamethyl-28-propyl-1-oxa-4,7,10,13,16,19,24,27-octaazacyclotriacontane-3,6,9,12,15,18,21,23,26,30-decaone
- Other names: Lyngbyastatin 1; Lyngbyastatin 3

Identifiers
CAS Number	1: 213530-40-6
3D model (JSmol)	1: Interactive image; 3: Interactive image
ChEBI	3: CHEBI:207792
ChEMBL	3: ChEMBL1711969
ChemSpider	1: 8549217; 3: 26398060
PubChem CID	1: 10373774; 3: 44246697
- InChI: 1: InChI=1S/C51H82N8O12/c1-18-30(7)42-47(66)53-26-39(60)57(14)37(24-28(3)4)45(64)52-27-40(61)59(16)41(29(5)6)48(67)58(15)38(25-34-20-22-35(70-17)23-21-34)46(65)54-32(9)43(62)51(11,12)50(69)56(13)33(10)44(63)55-36(19-2)31(8)49(68)71-42/h20-23,28-33,36-38,41-42H,18-19,24-27H2,1-17H3,(H,52,64)(H,53,66)(H,54,65)(H,55,63)/t30-,31-,32?,33-,36+,37-,38-,41-,42-/m0/s1 Key: FKPLJWGRBCQLTL-UHFFFAOYSA-N; 3: InChI=1S/C52H84N8O12/c1-18-20-37-32(8)50(69)72-43(31(7)19-2)48(67)54-27-40(61)58(14)38(25-29(3)4)46(65)53-28-41(62)60(16)42(30(5)6)49(68)59(15)39(26-35-21-23-36(71-17)24-22-35)47(66)55-33(9)44(63)52(11,12)51(70)57(13)34(10)45(64)56-37/h21-24,29-34,37-39,42-43H,18-20,25-28H2,1-17H3,(H,53,65)(H,54,67)(H,55,66)(H,56,64)/t31-,32-,33?,34-,37+,38-,39-,42-,43-/m0/s1 Key: BNVLXJXRCARHAN-KJYYPGTOSA-N
- SMILES: 1: CC[C@@H]1[C@@H](C(=O)O[C@H](C(=O)NCC(=O)N([C@H](C(=O)NCC(=O)N([C@H](C(=O)N([C@H](C(=O)NC(C(=O)C(C(=O)N([C@H](C(=O)N1)C)C)(C)C)C)CC2=CC=C(C=C2)OC)C)C(C)C)C)CC(C)C)C)[C@@H](C)CC)C; 3: CCC[C@@H]1[C@@H](C(=O)O[C@H](C(=O)NCC(=O)N([C@H](C(=O)NCC(=O)N([C@H](C(=O)N([C@H](C(=O)NC(C(=O)C(C(=O)N([C@H](C(=O)N1)C)C)(C)C)C)CC2=CC=C(C=C2)OC)C)C(C)C)C)CC(C)C)C)[C@@H](C)CC)C
- Except where otherwise noted, data are given for materials in their standard state (at 25 °C [77 °F], 100 kPa). Infobox references

Lyngbyastatins 1 and 3 are cytotoxic cyclic depsipeptides that possess antiproliferative activity against human cancer cell lines. These compounds, first isolated from the extract of a Lyngbya majuscula/Schizothrix calcicola assemblage and from L. majuscula Harvey ex Gomont (Oscillatoriaceae) strains, respectively, target the actin cytoskeleton of eukaryotic cells.

== Biosynthesis ==
Lyngbyastatins 1 and 3 are encoded for by a 52 kb biosynthetic gene cluster (BGC) containing one polyketide synthase (PKS)/non-ribosomal peptide synthetase (NRPS) hybrid (LbnA), four NRPSs (LbnB-D, LbnF), and one PKS (LbnE).

Biosynthesis commences with PKS activity — thiolation of propanoic (Lyngbyastatin 1) or butyric (Lyngbyastatin 3) acid and subsequent loading onto the ketosynthase (KS) of LbnA. An acyl unit from malonyl CoA is then coupled onto the initial substrate via an acyltransferase (AT) and then methylated at the alpha carbon through a C-methyltransferase (CMT) before an aminotransferase (AmT) conducts a transamination of the initial substrate carbonyl. The latter half of LbnA follows traditional NRPS activity containing condensation (C), adenylation (A), and thiolation (T) domains to couple 2-hydroxy-3-methylvaleric acid, which is believed to be formed from the 2-oxo analog through PKS ketoreductase (KR) activity.

LbnB, a traditional NRPS, adds glycine into the growing thioester by its amino group. LbnC is another traditional NRPS that adds L-leucine and glycine, respectively, except the L-leucine domain possesses an active N-methyltransferase (NMT) domain that methylates the nitrogen of L-leucine.

NRPS LbnD then adds L-valine, L-tyrosine, and L or D-valine, respectively to the growing molecule. PKS LbnE couples an acyl unit from malonyl-CoA onto the C-terminus of the valine residue before a C-methyltransferase methylates the carbon alpha to the thioester twice to produce a quaternary alpha carbon.

NRPS LbnF completes the biosynthesis by coupling L-alanine before the thioesterase (TE) domain conducts a head-to-tail cyclization to produce the final depsipeptide products.

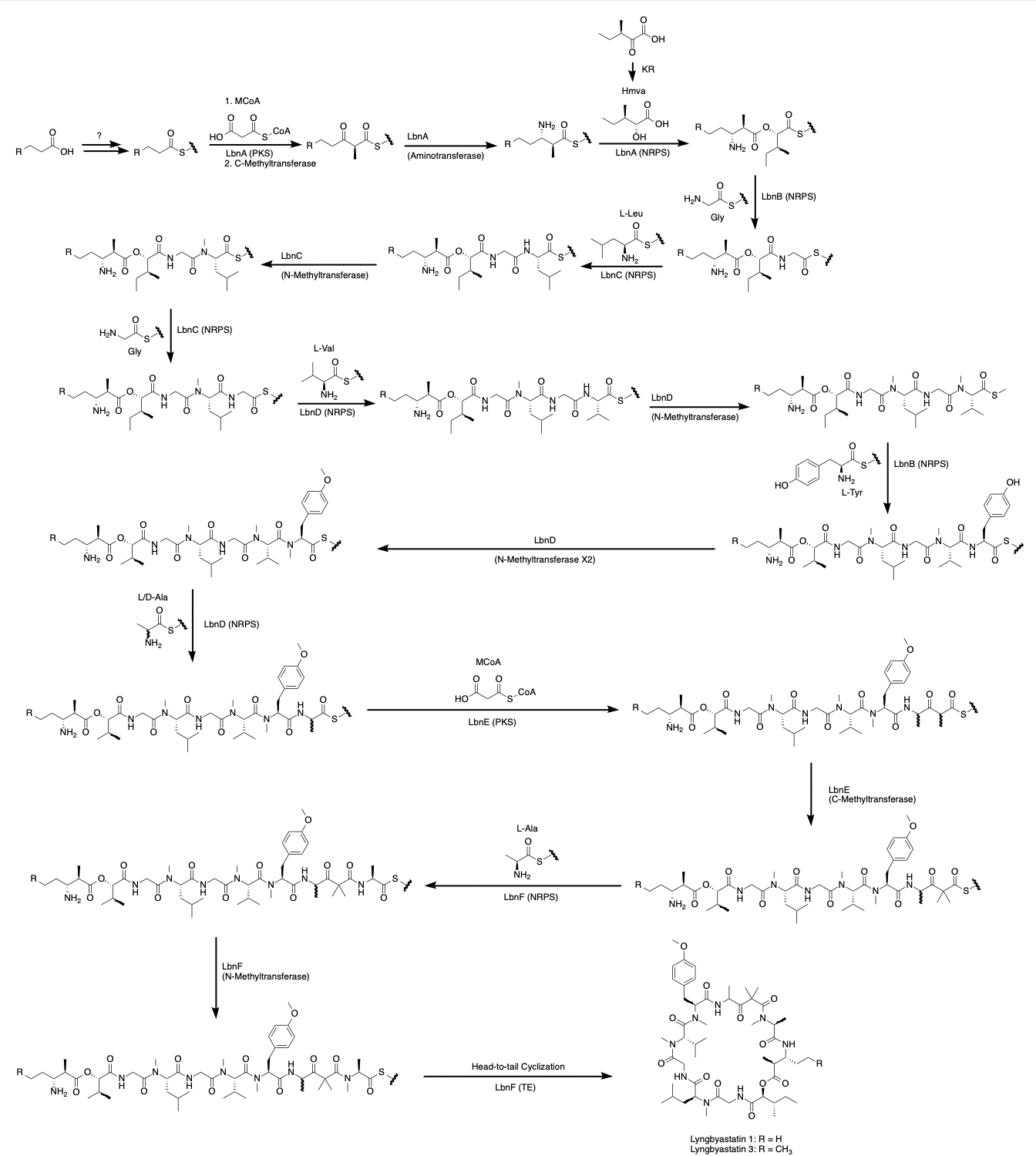
Proposed biosynthesis of lyngbyastatins 1 and 3.
