= Antillatoxin =

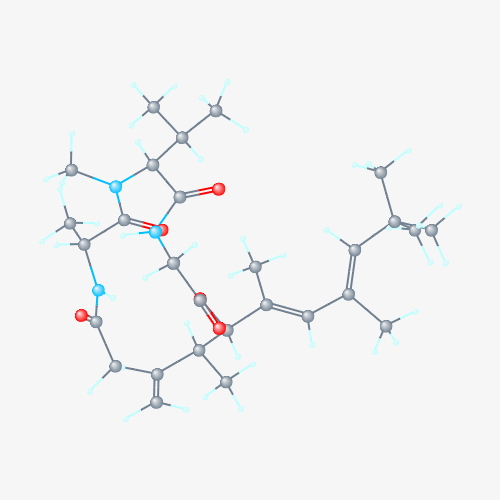
- Three-dimensional representation of antillatoxin

Names
- IUPAC name (6S,9S,14R,15R)-7,9,14-Trimethyl-13-methylidene-6-propan-2-yl-15-[(2E,4E)-4,6,6-trimethylhepta-2,4-dien-2-yl]-1-oxa-4,7,10-triazacyclopentadecane-2,5,8,11-tetrone
- Other names ATX

Identifiers
CAS Number	165967-02-2
3D model (JSmol)	Interactive image
ChEBI	CHEBI:204360
ChEMBL	ChEMBL464946
ChemSpider	28287038
PubChem CID	10051827
- InChI: InChI=1S/C27H43N3O5/c1-16(2)23-25(33)28-15-22(32)35-24(17(3)12-11-13-27(7,8)9)19(5)18(4)14-21(31)29-20(6)26(34)30(23)10/h11-13,16,19-20,23-24H,4,14-15H2,1-3,5-10H3,(H,28,33)(H,29,31)/b13-11+,17-12+/t19-,20+,23+,24+/m1/s1 Key: TYCMYIZCBRIDDR-GHGXTVDISA-N; InChI=1/C27H43N3O5/c1-16(2)23-25(33)28-15-22(32)35-24(17(3)12-11-13-27(7,8)9)19(5)18(4)14-21(31)29-20(6)26(34)30(23)10/h11-13,16,19-20,23-24H,4,14-15H2,1-3,5-10H3,(H,28,33)(H,29,31)/b13-11+,17-12+/t19-,20+,23+,24+/m1/s1 Key: TYCMYIZCBRIDDR-GHGXTVDIBQ
- SMILES: C[C@H]1[C@@H](OC(=O)CNC(=O)[C@@H](N(C(=O)[C@@H](NC(=O)CC1=C)C)C)C(C)C)/C(=C/C=C/C(C)(C)C)/C

Properties
Chemical formula	C_{28}H_{45}N_{3}O_{5}
Molar mass	503.674
- Except where otherwise noted, data are given for materials in their standard state (at 25 °C [77 °F], 100 kPa). Infobox references

Antillatoxin (ATX) is a potent lipopeptide neurotoxin produced by the marine cyanobacterium Lyngbya majuscula. ATX activates voltage-gated sodium channels, which can cause cell depolarisation, NMDA-receptor overactivity, excess calcium influx and neuronal necrosis.

== Sources ==
Antillatoxin is found in the venom of the marine cyanobacterium Lyngbya majuscula. The filamentous cyanobacterium grows on seagrass, macroalgae, and corals up to 30 m (98 ft) deep in tropical and subtropical regions throughout the world.

== Structure ==
The three dimensional NMR study of this toxin showed that it consists of a tripeptide glycine-N-methylvaline-alanine, a hydroxycarboxylic acid and a 9-t-butyl-6,8-dimethyl-6,8-diene attached to the C5 atom of the cyclic peptide backbone.

=== Analogs ===
There are three known analogous structures of ATX which have different toxicity: antillatoxin B (8-demethyl-antillatoxin) and DH-ATX (8-demethyl-8,9-dihydro-antillatoxin), and various stereoisomers of antillatoxin A. These various structures have been found to be less toxic than antillatoxin A. Synthetic versions of antillatoxin have been produced with conformational variations of the lipophilic side chain. All of these structures drastically changed the toxins activity. Structures where the C7-C8=C9 bond angle was closer to 180^{o} showed lower levels of toxicity in cell cultures. Structures that added a bulky side group to the C5 position also showed dramatic decreases in toxicity, including loss of activity.

=== Synthesis ===
The figure below shows the first total synthesis of antillatoxin by Yokokawa et al. in 1998. (2E,4E)-2,4,6,6-Tetramethyl-2,4-heptadien-1-ol was transformed using a stereoselective aldol reaction, followed by the addition of a triethylsilyl protecting group. This allowed for cleavage of the chiral auxiliary of the ester. TPAP oxidation followed by Still's olefination and protonation leads to the lactone. After transformation into the phenylselenyl derivative, alkaline cleavage, allyl esterification and coupling with the tripeptide yields the ester. Oxidation leads to the linear product, which is transformed into antillatoxin by deprotection at the N and C terminals and macrolactimization with DPPA.

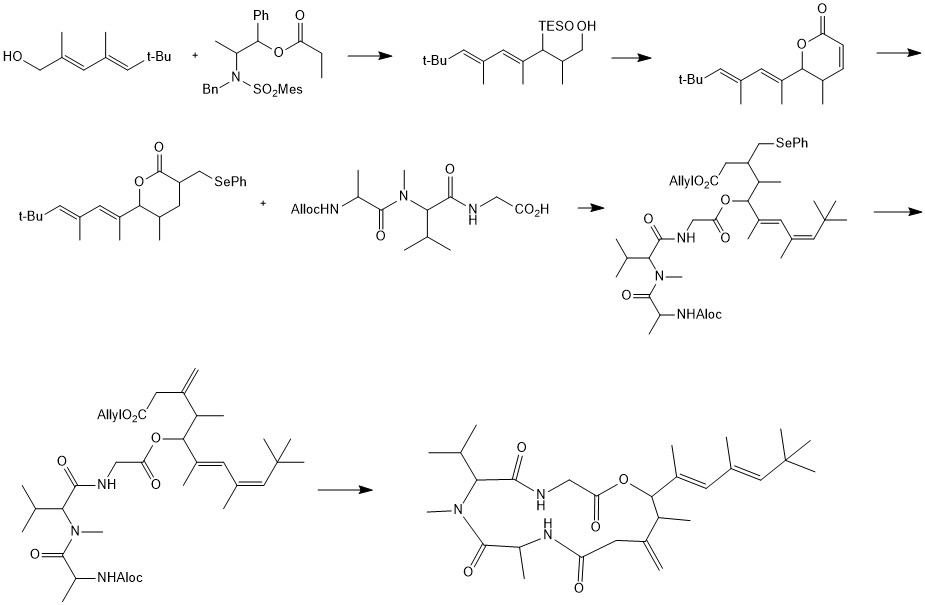
Chemical synthesis of antillatoxin

== Target ==
Antillatoxin is a sodium channel gating modifier with special efficacy in cells expressing rNa_{v}1.2, rNa_{v}1.4 and rNa_{v}1.5 α subunits. It is suggested that ATX preferentially binds to the voltage-gated sodium channel in the inactivated state. The specific site of interaction of this neurotoxin is not yet known, however there is an allosteric interaction between ATX and brevetoxin (PbTx) at site 5 of the α subunit, which indicates that the neurotoxin site for ATX is topologically close and/or conformationally coupled to neurotoxin site 5. Additionally, sites 1, 2, 3, 5 and 7 were ruled out as possible binding sites.

Changing the tert-butyl-substituted diene groups reduced toxicity, which proves that the twisted shape of these groups plays a critical role in the degree of neurotoxicity of ATX.

== Mode of action ==
Antillatoxin activates voltage-gated sodium channels, thus increasing sodium influx into the cell. It is hypothesized that ATX creates the increase in sodium influx by altering the voltage-gating properties of the channel. The toxin might change the voltage dependence of inactivation or augment the rate of recovery from inactivation. The effect is concentration dependent, with similar potency for the rNav1.2, rNav1.4 and rNav1.5 α-subunit types of sodium channels.

Antillatoxin-induced cytotoxicity is thought to occur through excessive activation of NMDA receptors by increased sodium influx, leading to excess calcium influx and necrosis. The exact mechanism is still unclear, as antillatoxin's effect on the membrane potential is not sufficient to relieve the NMDA receptor block by magnesium.

Aside from toxic effects, ATX seems to enhance neurite outgrowth in developing immature neurons, depending on sodium influx, NMDA receptor activity, voltage-gated calcium channels and the calmodulin-kinase pathway.

== Toxicity ==
The toxin has been implicated in cases of respiratory irritation, inflammation of the eye and severe contact dermatitis in fishermen. Antillatoxin is a very potent neurotoxin, although exact toxicity differs between species. The lethal concentration LC_{50} is about 0.1 μM for goldfish, making it the most potent toxin known for goldfish after brevetoxin. It can be cytotoxic to single cerebellar granule cells at concentrations as low as 20 nM in rats but more typically at 50 nM.

Morphological features of antillatoxin-induced neuronal toxicity are swelling of neuronal somata, thinning of neurites and blebbing of neurite membranes.

== Drug Interactions ==
Cytotoxicity can be blocked by noncompetitive NMDA antagonists, such as dextrorphan and MK-801. These compounds are only effective when present at the same time as the toxin, as opposed to post-exposure. Tetrodotoxin, a sodium channel antagonist, was found to prevent the sodium and calcium influxes caused by antillatoxin. Other voltage gated sodium channel antagonists also inhibit the effects of antillatoxin, such as lidocaine, lamotrigine, phenytoin, carbamazepine, riluzole, and SKA-19. Riluzole, SKA-19, carbamazepine, and lamotrigine were capable of near complete inhibition of membrane depolarization, based on their concentration.

Antillatoxin itself is an allosteric agonist for the action of batrachotoxin, and becomes even more effective when combined with brevetoxin.
