= Thiazoline =

Names
- IUPAC names 2,3-Dihydrothiazole; 2,5-Dihydrothiazole; 4,5-Dihydrothiazole
- Other names 2,3-Dihydro-1,3-thiazole or 4-thiazoline 2,5-Dihydro-1,3-thiazole or 3-thiazoline 4,5-Dihydro-1,3-thiazole or 2-thiazoline

Identifiers
CAS Number	(2,3): 504-79-0; (2,5): 24576-55-4; (4,5): 504-79-0
3D model (JSmol)	(2,3): Interactive image; (2,5): Interactive image; (4,5): Interactive image
ChemSpider	(2,3): 133456; (2,5): 10541467; (4,5): 107368
PubChem CID	(2,3): 151424; (2,5): 15194654; (4,5): 120269
CompTox Dashboard (EPA)	(2,3): DTXSID70198448
- InChI: (2,3): InChI=1S/C3H5NS/c1-2-5-3-4-1/h1-2,4H,3H2 Key: OYJGEOAXBALSMM-UHFFFAOYSA-N; (2,5): InChI=1S/C3H5NS/c1-2-5-3-4-1/h1H,2-3H2 Key: JLPUISACQXFVRC-UHFFFAOYSA-N; (4,5): InChI=1S/C3H5NS/c1-2-5-3-4-1/h3H,1-2H2 Key: CBDKQYKMCICBOF-UHFFFAOYSA-N
- SMILES: (2,3): C1=CSCN1; (2,5): C1=NCSC1; (4,5): C1CSC=N1

Properties
Chemical formula	C_{3}H_{5}NS
Molar mass	87.14 g·mol^{−1}
Appearance	Colorless liquids
- Except where otherwise noted, data are given for materials in their standard state (at 25 °C [77 °F], 100 kPa). verify (what is ?) Infobox references

Thiazolines (/θaɪˈæzoʊliːnz/; or dihydrothiazoles) are a group of isomeric 5-membered heterocyclic compounds containing both sulfur and nitrogen in the ring. Although unsubstituted thiazolines are rarely encountered themselves, their derivatives are more common and some are bioactive. For example, in a common post-translational modification, cysteine residues are converted into thiazolines.

The name thiazoline originates from the Hantzsch–Widman nomenclature.

== Isomers ==
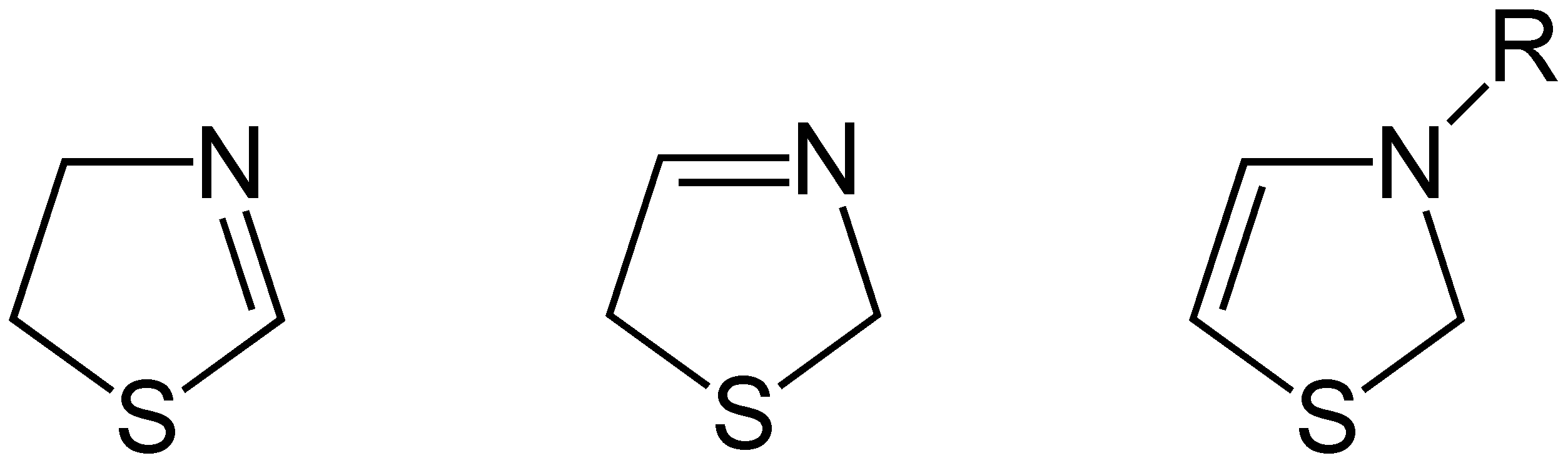
2-Thiazoline, 3-Thiazoline and 4-Thiazoline (from left to right)

Three structural isomers of thiazoline exist depending on the position of the double bond. These forms do not readily interconvert and hence are not tautomers. Of these 2-thiazoline is the most common.

A fourth structure exists in which the N and S atoms are adjacent; this known as isothiazoline.

== Synthesis ==
Thiazolines were first prepared by dialkylation of thioamides by Richard Willstatter in 1909. 2-Thiazolines are commonly prepared from 2-aminoethanethiols (e.g. cysteamine). They may also be synthesized via the Asinger reaction.

== Applications ==
Many molecules contain thiazoline rings, one example being Firefly luciferin, the light-emitting molecule in fireflies. The amino acid cysteine is produced industrially from substituted thiazole. 2-Aminothiazoline-4-carboxylic acid is an intermediate in the industrial synthesis of L-cysteine.

== See also ==
- Thiazole - an analogue with 2 double bonds
- Thiazolidine - an analogue with no double bonds
- Oxazoline - an analogue with O in place of S
