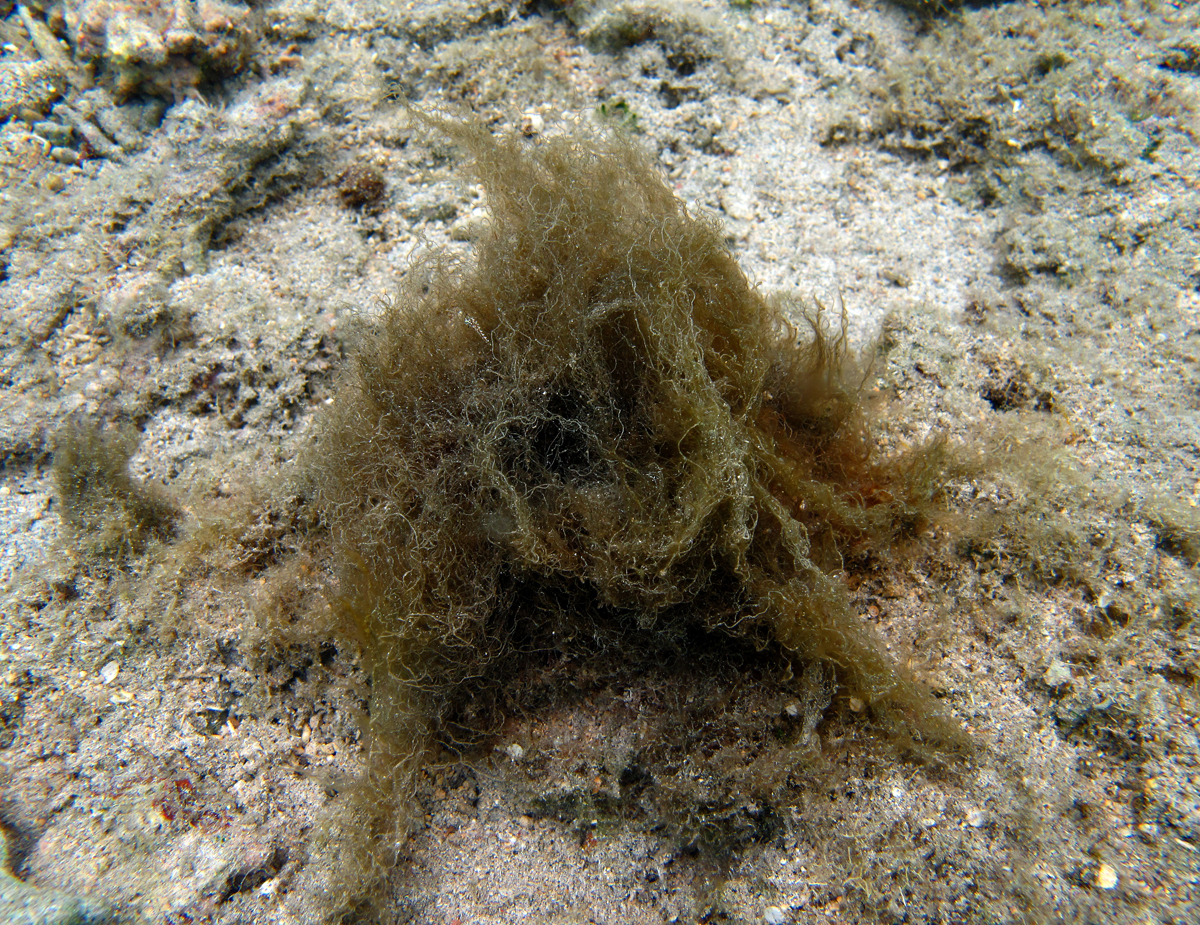
- Lyngbya majuscula at Réunion

Scientific classification
- Domain: Bacteria
- Kingdom: Bacillati
- Phylum: Cyanobacteriota
- Class: Cyanophyceae
- Order: Oscillatoriales
- Family: Oscillatoriaceae
- Genus: Lyngbya
- Species: L. majuscula

Binomial name
- Lyngbya majuscula Harvey ex Gomont

= Lyngbya majuscula =

Species of bacterium

Lyngbya majuscula is a species of filamentous cyanobacteria in the genus Lyngbya. It is named after the Dane Hans Christian Lyngbye.

As a result of recent genetic analyses, several new genera were erected from the genus Lyngbya: e.g., Moorea, Limnoraphis, Okeania, Microseira, and Dapis. Several specimens identified as L. majuscula and collected in marine tropical regions are now classified as members of the genera Okeania and Moorea.

L. majuscula is the cause of seaweed dermatitis.

== Chemical constituents ==
Almost 300 different secondary metabolites have been isolated from specimens identified as L. majuscula. However, most of these studies lack a molecular identification of the samples. The toxins antillatoxin and kalkitoxin and the lipopeptide dragomabin have been isolated from L. majuscula. Serinolamide A is a cannabinoid structurally related to anandamide that has been found to occur in Lyngbya majuscula.
