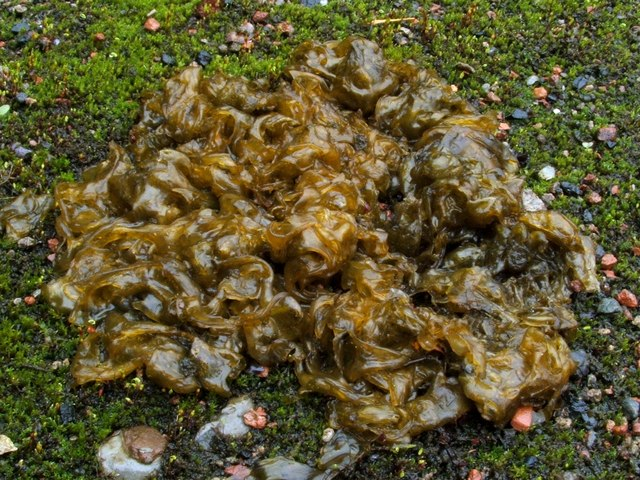
- Nostoc commune

Scientific classification
- Domain: Bacteria
- Kingdom: Bacillati
- Phylum: Cyanobacteriota
- Class: Cyanophyceae
- Order: Nostocales
- Family: Nostocaceae
- Genus: Nostoc
- Species: N. commune

Binomial name
- Nostoc commune Vaucher ex Bornet & Flahault, 1888

Varieties
- Nostoc commune var. sphaeroides

Synonyms
- Nostocella communis Gaillon; Tremella nostoc Carl Linnaeus 1753; Ulva pruniformis Carl Linnaeus 1753; Nostoc kurzianum Zeller 1873

= Nostoc commune =

Species of bacterium

Nostoc commune is a species of cyanobacterium in the family Nostocaceae. Common names include star jelly, witch's butter, mare's eggs. It is the type species of the genus Nostoc and is cosmopolitan in distribution.

== Description ==
Nostoc commune is a colonial species of cyanobacterium. It initially forms a small, hollow gelatinous globule which grows and becomes leathery, flattened and convoluted, forming a gelatinous mass with other colonies growing nearby. Inside the thin sheath are numerous unbranched hair-like structures called trichomes formed of short cells in a string. The cells are bacteria and thus have no nucleus nor internal membrane system. To multiply, they form two new cells when they divide by binary fission. Along the trichomes, larger specialist nitrogen-fixing cells called heterocysts occur between the ordinary cells. When wet, Nostoc commune is bluish-green, olive green or brown but in dry conditions it becomes an inconspicuous, crisp brownish mat.

== Distribution and habitat ==
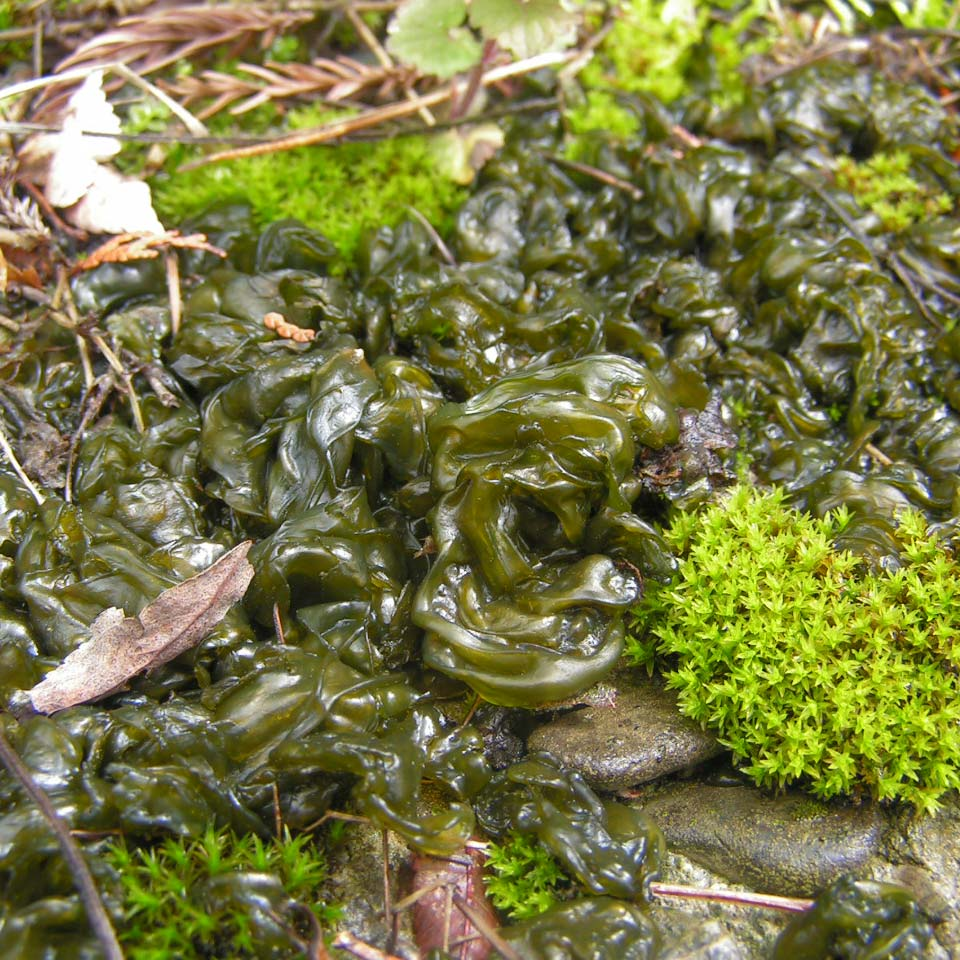
Nostoc commune

Nostoc commune is found in many countries around the world. It is able to survive in extreme conditions in polar regions and arid areas. It is a terrestrial or freshwater species and forms loose clumps on soil, gravel and paved surfaces, among mosses and between cobbles. In Singapore, Nostoc commune is found growing on alkaline soils, in brackish water, in paddy fields, on cliffs and on wet rocks.

== Biology ==
Nostoc commune can fix nitrogen from the atmosphere and can therefore live in locations where no nitrogenous compounds are available from the substrate. Nostoc commune contains photosynthetic pigments and the energy storing photosystems in membrane structures called thylakoids located in cytoplasm of the cells. It also contains pigments that absorb long and medium wavelength ultraviolet radiation, which enables it to survive in places with high levels of radiation.

Under adverse conditions, Nostoc commune can remain dormant for an extended period of time and revive when conditions improve and water becomes available. The desiccated colony is resistant to heat and to repeated patterns of freezing and thawing and produces no oxygen while dormant. It has been found that extracellular polysaccharides are vital to its stress tolerance and ability to recover.

Nostoc commune can occur in pockets in the thallus of hornworts such as Phaeoceros.

== Uses ==
Nostoc commune is eaten as a salad in the Philippines and is also eaten in Indonesia, Japan and China. In Taiwan, it is nicknamed 雨來菇 yǔ lái gū (meaning "post-rain mushroom"). Research indicates that consumption of Nostoc commune var. sphaeroides, in addition to consumption of other cyanobacteria, may be beneficial by means of an anti-inflammatory mechanism.

The related Nostoc flagelliforme, sometimes named as a variety of this species, is known as 发菜 fàcài in China. It forms part of the food traditionally served at the Lunar New Year.
