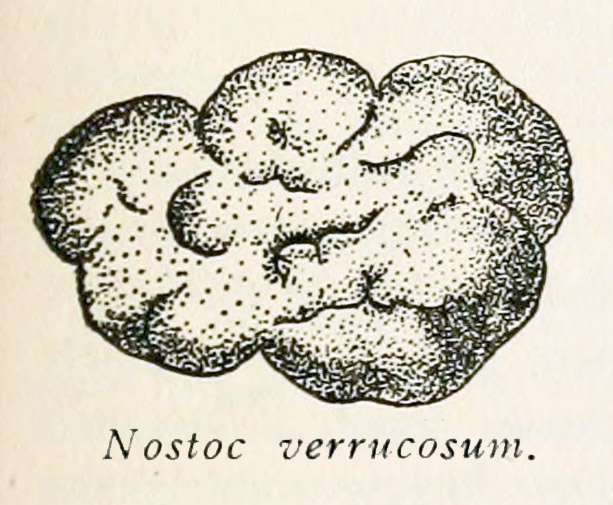
- Nostoc verrucosum

Scientific classification
- Domain: Bacteria
- Kingdom: Bacillati
- Phylum: Cyanobacteriota
- Class: Cyanophyceae
- Order: Nostocales
- Family: Nostocaceae
- Genus: Nostoc
- Species: N. verrucosum

Binomial name
- Nostoc verrucosum Vauch.

= Nostoc verrucosum =

Species of bacterium

Nostoc verrucosum is a species of cyanobacteria usually found in colonies and in globose racks. It has a greenish to blackish color and the colonies are velvety to the touch. It grows in creek beds, shallow streams, waterfalls, and moist understory in rain forests, in alkaline soil and water habitat. It is found worldwide, including Japan, where it is most studied. The cyanobacteria grows best in low temperatures with high water clarity, and submerged in water. But, can also withstand freezing and thawing cycles, surviving in extreme conditions such as the Arctic and Antarctica. Since N. verrucosum needs stable conditions like water clarity and low temperatures, it is very susceptible to external pressures and anthropogenic factors like habitat loss, pollution, and invasive species. Nostoc verrucosum is a prokaryotic organism that is highly affected by desiccation and is preyed upon by midges. N. verrucosum has also been a cultural dish throughout history.

== Nitrogen Fixation ==
Like other Nostoc species, this organism fixes nitrogen and provides important nutrients for plants, forming a symbiotic interaction. Since N. verrucosum has nitrogen (N²) fixing capabilities, it is very useful for terrestrial and aquatic ecosystems. Like all other prokaryotic organisms, it is without organized nucleus and 70%-85% of its cytoplasm is water.

A photo of a patch of Nostoc verrucosum in Santa Clarita, CA, USA identified using INatuarlist.

== Desiccation ==
Many Nostoc species can stay dormant when dried out, (called desiccation) for long periods of time and abruptly recover metabolic activity when rehydrated. N. verrucosum has been studied, and compared to Nostoc commune, another species of cyanobacteria in the Genus Nostoc, it is more vulnerable to severe desiccation. Scientists hypothesized that since the two species have very similar extra-cellular matrixes that they would be affected by desiccation equally. But, data showing that some cells had died after being air dried, refuted this hypothesis.

== History ==
Historically, Nostoc verrcosum and other Nostoc cyanobacteria have been considered edible in many different countries like China, Thailand, Philippines, Indonesia, Mongolia, Ecuador and Fiji. One species commonly eaten being N. flagelliforme. In Japan, around the 8th century, N. verrucosum eaten and generally called ashitsuki (アシツキ) or (日本語). Nostoc verrcosum also has many other local names including kotobuki-nori, kotobuki-dake, mitoku-nori, and shiga-nori.

== Predation ==
A photo of a rock located in San Mateo County, CA, USA covered in Nostoc verrucosum identified by INaturalist. Nostoc verrucosum

In a study done in Spain, where Nostoc verrucosum is also found, Chironomid larve or midges and their predation had affects on many different Nostoc species. It was discovered that the midges did not create better light exposure and flow pattern conditions from predation, which was a supported explanation for a similar species of Nostoc parmelioides. This lack of mutualistic relationship between Nostoc verrucosum and the midges in European streams is different than other Nostoc species.
