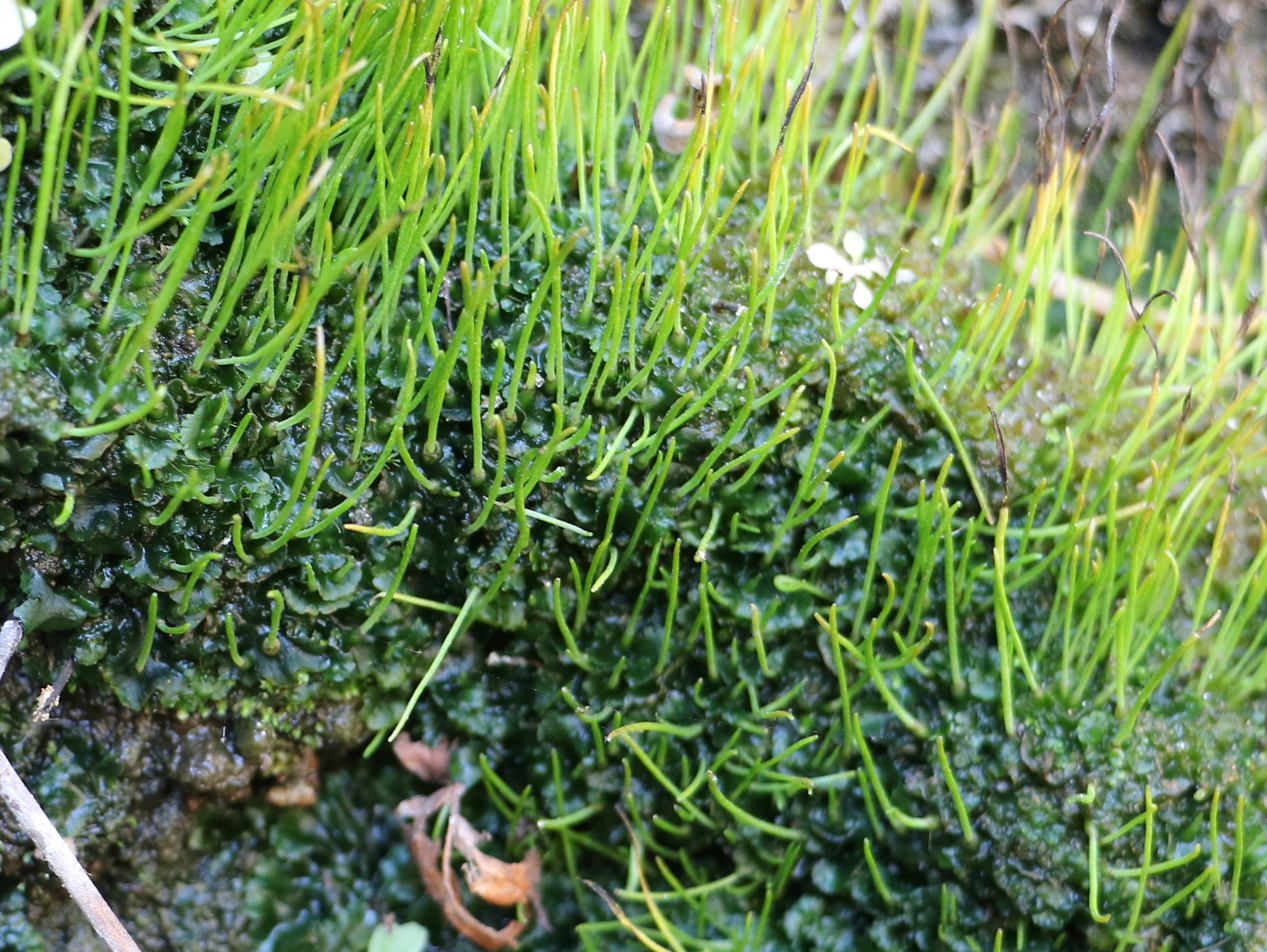
- at McMahons Point, Australia

Conservation status
- Near Threatened (IUCN 3.1) (Europe regional assessment)

- Secure (NatureServe)

Scientific classification
- Kingdom: Plantae
- Division: Anthocerotophyta
- Class: Anthocerotopsida
- Order: Notothyladales
- Family: Notothyladaceae
- Genus: Phaeoceros
- Species: P. carolinianus

Binomial name
- Phaeoceros carolinianus (Michx.) Prosk.

Synonyms
- List: Anthoceros carolinianus Michx.; Anthoceros laciniatus Schwein.; Carpoceros carolinianus (Michx.) Dumort.; Anthoceros bilobata Turpin; Anthoceros havaiensis Reichardt; Anthoceros donnellii Austin; Anthoceros laevis var. carolinianus (Michx.) Lindb.; Anthoceros callistictus Spruce; Anthoceros affinis Schiffn.; Anthoceros brotheri Steph.; Anthoceros planus Steph.; Anthoceros tenuissimus Steph.; Anthoceros communis Steph.; Anthoceros usambarensis Steph.; Aspiromitus allionii Steph.; Anthoceros atlanticus Steph.; Anthoceros autoicus Steph.; Anthoceros cataractarum Steph.; Aspiromitus chinensis Steph.; Anthoceros crispus Steph.; Anthoceros cubanus Steph.; Anthoceros ecklonii Steph.; Anthoceros elegans Steph.; Anthoceros gollanii Steph.; Anthoceros japonicus Steph.; Anthoceros koreanus Steph.; Anthoceros kuntzeanus Steph.; Anthoceros lamellisporus Steph.; Anthoceros leratii Steph.; Anthoceros luzonensis Steph.; Anthoceros miyoshianus Steph.; Anthoceros multicapsulus Steph.; Anthoceros pusillus Steph.; Anthoceros silvaticus Steph.; Anthoceros subcostatus Steph.; Anthoceros sumatranus Steph.; Anthoceros tenax Steph.; Anthoceros validus Steph.; Aspiromitus cristulatus Steph.; Aspiromitus fontinalis Steph.; Aspiromitus havaiensis (Reichardt) Steph.; Aspiromitus padangensis Steph.; Aspiromitus parisii Steph.; Aspiromitus philippinensis Steph.; Aspiromitus preangeranus Steph.; Aspiromitus tonkinensis Steph.; Megaceros callistictus (Spruce) Steph.; Megaceros laciniatus (Schwein.) Steph.; Anthoceros arsenii Steph.; Anthoceros esquirolii Steph.; Anthoceros jackii Steph.; Anthoceros luzonensis Steph.; Anthoceros nordenskjoeldii Steph.; Anthoceros parvus Steph.; Anthoceros subalpinus Steph.; Aspiromitus novazealandicus Pearson; Anthoceros australiae Beauverd; Anthoceros moldavicus Tarn.; Anthoceros kuhlmannii Herzog; Phaeoceros novazealandicus (Pearson) Prosk.; Phaeoceros laevis f. carolinianus (Michx.) R.M.Schust.; Anthoceros laevis subsp. carolinianus (Michx.) R.M.Schust.; Phaeoceros laevis subsp. carolinianus (Michx.) Prosk.; Phaeoceros jackii (Steph.) Bapna; Phaeoceros kuhlmannii (Herzog) K.G.Hell; Phaeoceros gollanii (Steph.) Kachroo & Bapna; Phaeoceros cataractarum (Steph.) Udar & D.K.Singh; Phaeoceros esquiirolli (Steph.) Udar & D.K.Singh; Phaeoceros lamellisporus (Steph.) Udar & D.K.Singh; Phaeoceros parisii (Steph.) H.A. Mill.; Phaeoceros subalpinus (Steph.) Udar & D.K.Singh; Phaeoceros tenax (Steph.) Udar & D.K.Singh; Phaeoceros donnellii (Austin) J.Haseg. ex Stotler & Crand.-Stotl.; Anthoceros carolinianus var. carolinianus; Anthoceros carolinianus var. occidentalis M.Howe; Anthoceros laevis f. tenuis Nees; Anthoceros laevis f. torulosus S.Hatt.; Anthoceros laevis var. tenuis (Nees) Gottsche, Lindenb. & Nees

= Phaeoceros carolinianus =

Species of hornwort

Phaeoceros carolinianus is a species of hornwort—a group of simple, non-vascular plants—that is found worldwide in damp, shaded areas. It forms flat, dark green, rosette-shaped patches measuring 10–20 mm in diameter on bare soil and rock surfaces. The plant is characterised by its horn-like spore capsules, which grow 40–60 mm tall, and for producing both male and female reproductive structures on the same plant (a monoicous condition). These features, along with its unique spore structure, distinguish it from closely related species like P. laevis.

First described by the French botanist André Michaux in 1803 from specimens collected in the Carolinas, Phaeoceros carolinianus has a complex taxonomic history and was later assigned to the genus Phaeoceros by Johannes Max Proskauer in 1951. While it often behaves as an annual plant in temporary habitats such as arable fields, it can persist longer in continuously moist environments and survive dry periods by forming tuber-like structures. The species is not only important ecologically but has also been developed as a model organism for genetic research due to its simple morphology and ease of cultivation.

== Systematics ==
=== Historical taxonomy ===
The genus Phaeoceros, which was erected by Johannes Max Proskauer in 1951 and currently includes about 40 accepted species, is characterised by solid, smooth thalli, antheridial chambers typically containing 1–8 antheridia, and capsules without a distinct line of dehiscence.

The French botanist André Michaux first described the species in 1803 from Carolinas specimens, originally naming it Anthoceros carolinianus. Several previously described species have since been recognised as synonyms, including Anthoceros australiae, A. brotheri, A. communis, and A. multicapsulus.

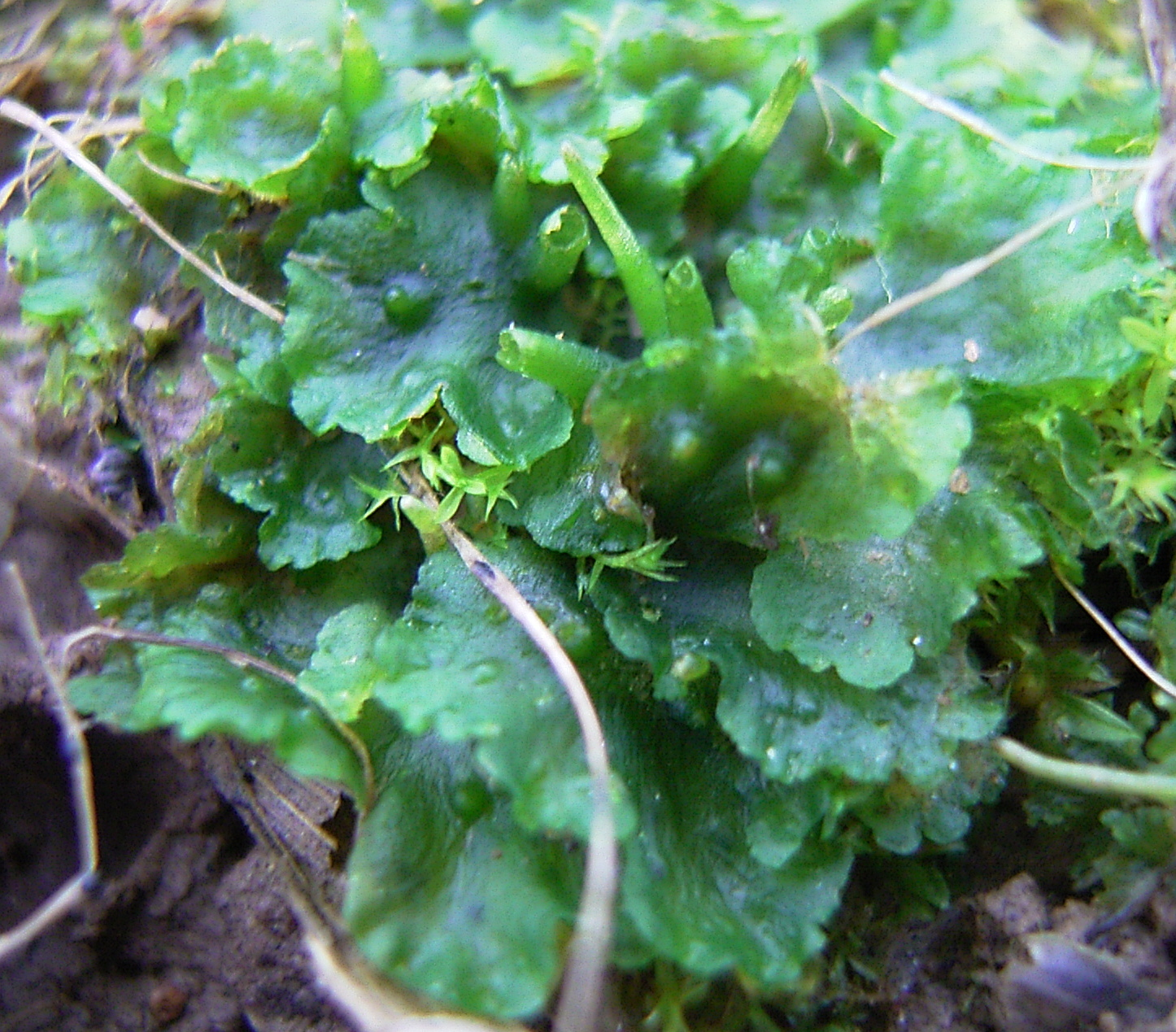
Phaeoceros laevis is a similar species that has often been historically confused with P. carolinianus.

The taxonomic history of the species has been complex. Proskauer initially studied these hornworts as part of the genus Anthoceros in 1948, but after detailed morphological studies, he created the genus Phaeoceros in 1951 specifically to accommodate the yellow-spored species, leaving only black-spored taxa in Anthoceros. At this time, he also separated P. carolinianus from P. laevis based on its reproductive condition and chromosome morphology. However, by 1958, after observing considerable variability in specimens from many countries, Proskauer temporarily merged them as subspecies, treating the taxon as P. laevis subsp. carolinianus.

Decades of taxonomic confusion led Proskauer to propose that there was one species, P. laevis, with two subspecies: dioicous laevis in the Mediterranean and monoicous carolinianus worldwide. This taxonomic treatment was widely adopted and remained in use through the 1970s and early 1980s.

The difficulty in distinguishing these taxa was compounded by the challenges of observing their reproductive condition. Even in monoicous P. carolinianus, the timing of male and female reproductive structure development can make it hard to confirm its reproductive status. Plants may initially produce only antheridia, with archegonia appearing weeks later, while those growing in deep shade may remain purely vegetative. Additionally, as older parts of the thallus decay, it becomes difficult to locate evidence of previous antheridial cavities.

The taxonomic resolution came through detailed studies in the 1980s, particularly through scanning electron microscopy of type specimens. In 1987, Hässel de Menéndez determined these taxa should be treated as separate species based on detailed studies of spore morphology. This separation was supported by differences in chromosome morphology, spore size, and distinctive spore ornamentation patterns. The spores of P. carolinianus feature distinct surface patterns, including short-pointed spines on the distal surface (up to 2 μm long at center, 0.5 μm at border) and 17–21 spines across the diameter, while the proximal surface has a well-defined trilete mark ending near the rim in an obtuse angle, with triangular areas showing fine, interwoven, noodle-like ornamentation.

=== Classification ===
Phaeoceros carolinianus belongs to the subclass Notothylatidae of the class Anthocerotopsida. Within this, it is placed in the order Notothyladales and family Notothyladaceae, alongside its close relatives in the genera Phaeoceros and Notothylas.

== Description ==
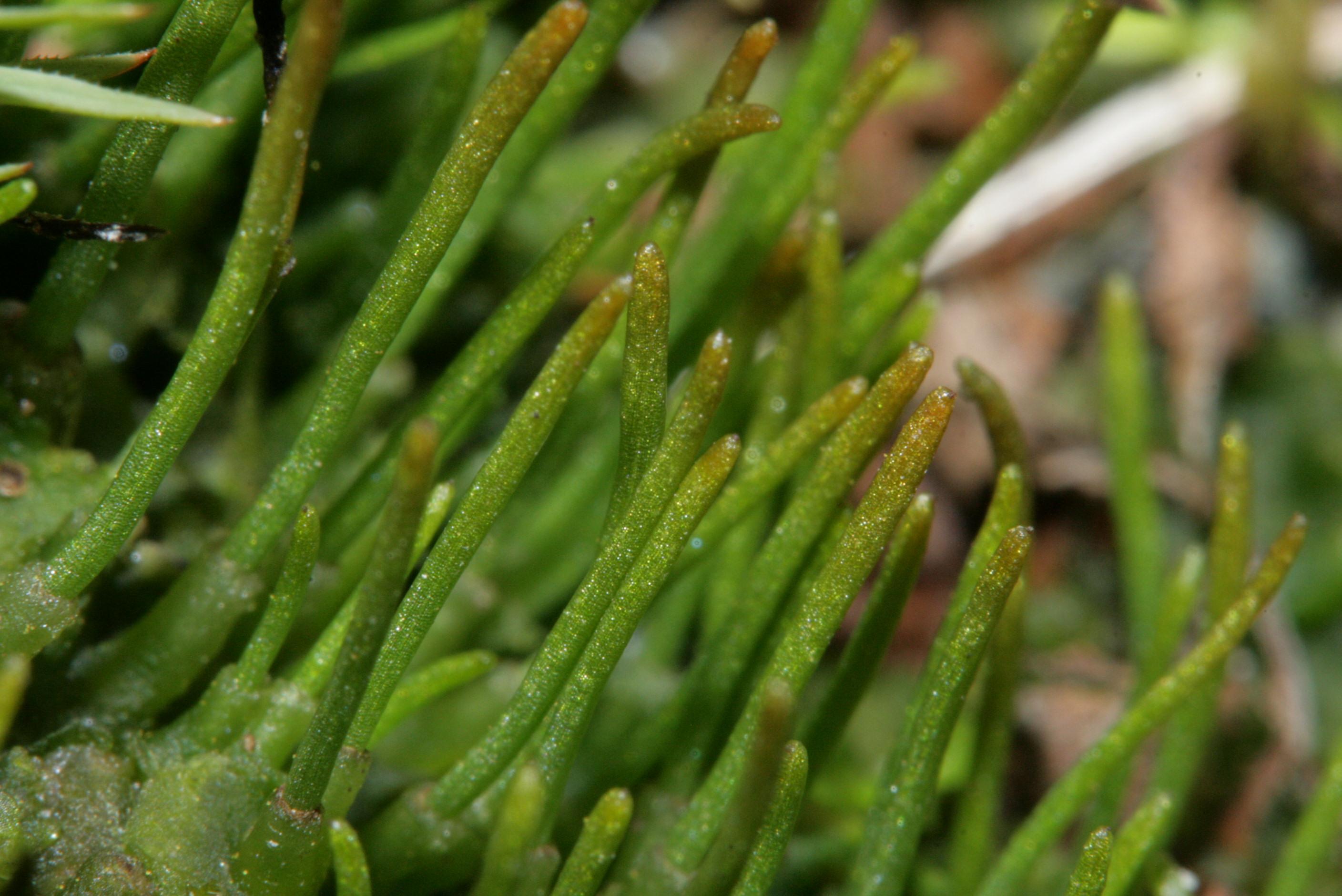
Close-up of the horn-like sporophytes, showing the green immature portions and yellowish mature tips where spores are developing

Phaeoceros carolinianus is a hornwort that forms flat, dark green, rosette-shaped patches on the ground. The plant body consists of two main parts: the gametophyte (the main vegetative body) and the sporophyte (the reproductive structure). The gametophyte consists of a flattened, branching thallus that grows 10–20 mm long and 5–10 mm wide. The thallus has a smooth margin and lacks specialised reproductive structures called gemmae. A distinctive feature of its cells is that each contains a single large chloroplast with a central pyrenoid (a protein structure involved in carbon fixation). On its underside, the thallus produces two types of root-like structures called rhizoids: smooth, transparent ones and pale brown tuberculate (warty) ones. The thallus hosts colonies of Nostoc, a cyanobacterium visible as dark spots on the lower surface.

The cellular organisation of P. carolinianus shows several distinctive features. Each cell is monoplastidic, containing a single large chloroplast with a pyrenoid-based carbon-concentrating mechanism, a feature that distinguishes it from most other land plants. The chloroplast contains extensive grana stacks and channel thylakoids. The cytoplasm contains typical plant cell organelles including mitochondria, Golgi bodies, and an endoplasmic reticulum network that extends throughout the cell. Within the thallus, cells are connected by plasmodesmata, allowing for intercellular communication. The thallus shows limited tissue differentiation compared to vascular plants, but maintains specialized regions including photosynthetic tissue and regions colonized by symbiotic cyanobacteria which appear as dark spots scattered throughout the plant's lower surface. These cyanobacterial colonies are housed in mucilage-filled cavities within the thallus tissue. The surface cells produce two types of rhizoids: smooth, transparent ones and pale brown tuberculate (warty) ones.

Phaeoceros carolinianus is distinguished by its sporophyte, a horn-like structure that emerges vertically from the thallus. These horn-like structures reach 40–60 mm in height, with spores developing progressively from base to tip. Each sporophyte comprises a foot anchored in parent tissue and an elongated, spore-producing capsule. The capsule wall contains small pores called stomata and has layers of photosynthetic tissue beneath its surface. At maturity, the capsule splits lengthwise into two parts to release bright yellow spores that measure 32.5–42.3 micrometres (μm) in diameter. These spores have a distinctive surface pattern, with spine-like projections on one face and smaller bumps arranged in a triangular pattern on the other face. Among the spores are sterile cells called pseudoelaters, which are pale brown, smooth, and usually branched.

The species can reproduce sexually, producing both male and female reproductive structures on the same plant (monoicous). The male structures (antheridia) mature before the female structures (archegonia), with each male chamber containing between one and eight antheridia that turn yellow-orange when mature.

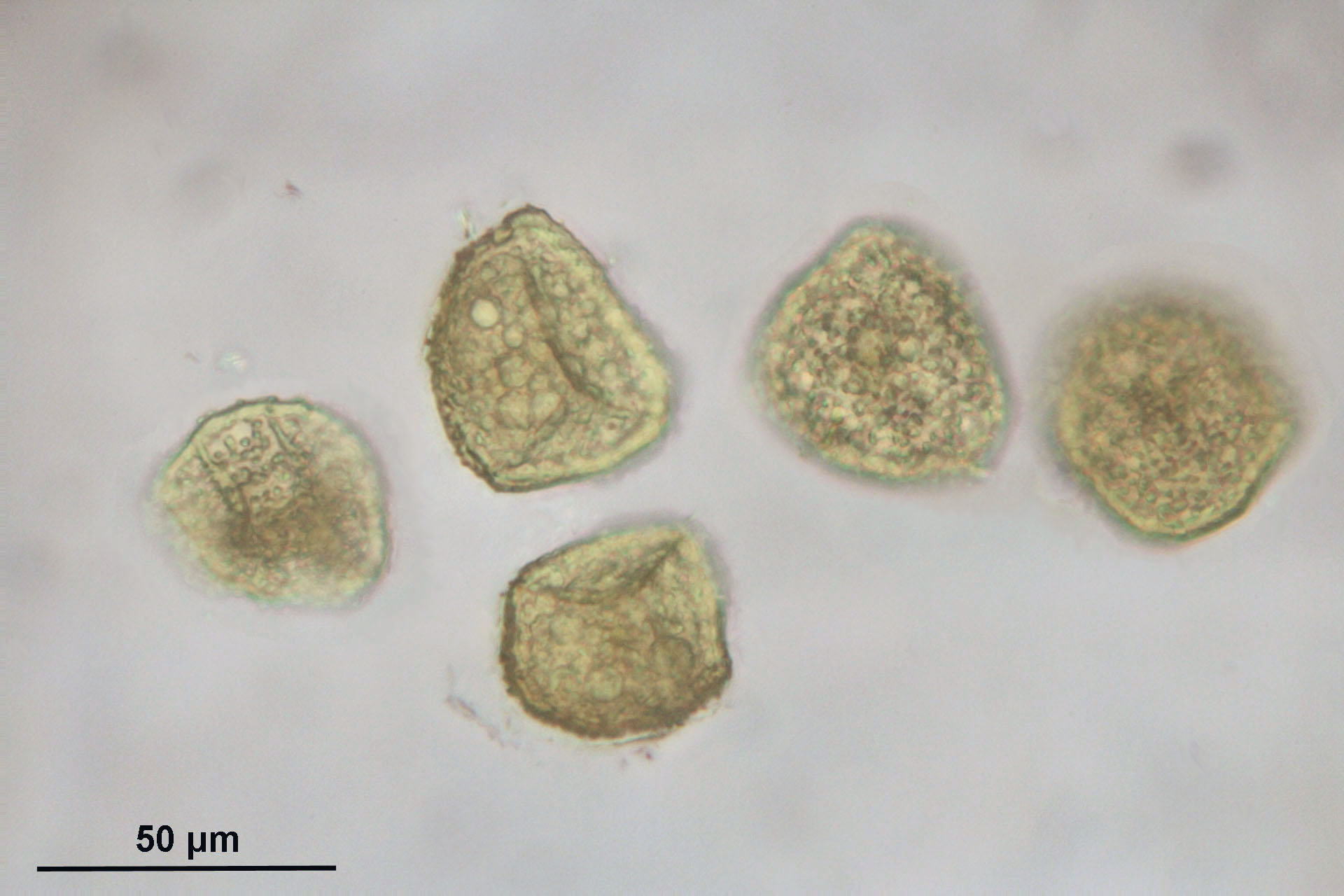
Ascospores, showing their characteristic surface ornamentation

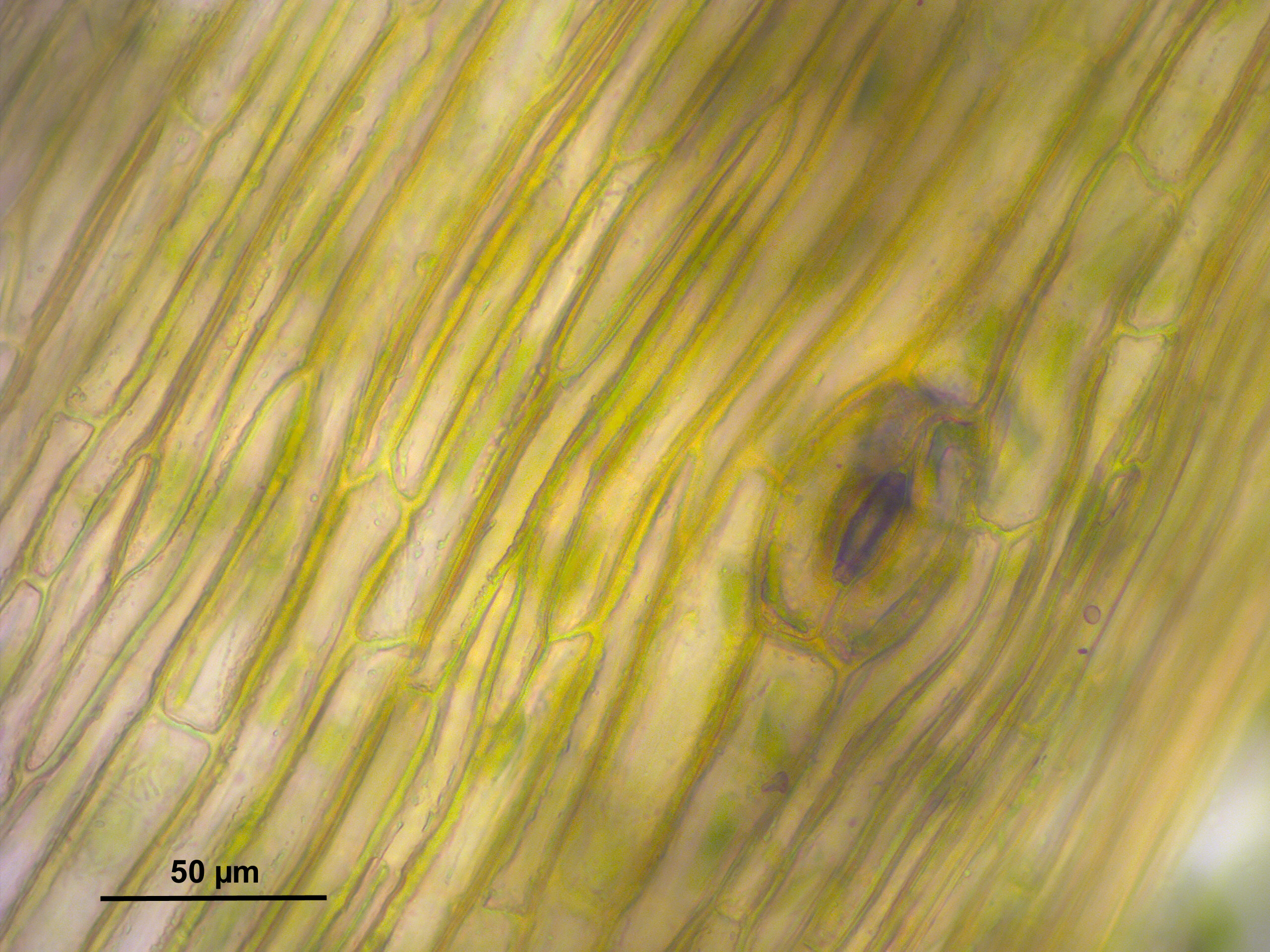
Sporophyte capsule wall showing elongated cells and a stoma

Microscopic features of P. carolinianus; scale bar = 50 μm

The spore wall has six layers, with spine-like projections on one side and small bumps (papillae) on the other. The bright yellow spores measure 42–47 (up to 49) μm in diameter, with the spine-like projections measuring about 2 μm long in the centre and 0.5 μm at the border. When examined with an electron microscope, the spore wall reveals (from inside to outer surface): a thin inner layer, a thick loose outer layer, a homogeneous middle layer that forms the surface ornamentations, and three additional outer coating layers of varying thickness. This complex wall structure provides protection and likely facilitates spore dispersal. Unlike some other hornworts, P. carolinianus has a particularly complex spore wall structure that suggests it is relatively advanced evolutionarily within the group. The proximal face of the spores has a nearly smooth or finely granulate surface with scattered, minute papillae only in the central part of each face, while the distal face is densely papillate to spinulate throughout, with 17–21 spines across the diameter. These spore characteristics are important diagnostic features that help distinguish P. carolinianus from the closely related P. laevis, which has densely papillate proximal surfaces.

The gametophyte shows some seasonal variation in its growth and reproduction. Sexual organs (antheridia) are produced from September to May. While it can survive as an annual plant in temporary habitats like arable fields, it is also known to form tuber-like thickenings containing rhizoids within or on the ventral surface of the thallus, which help it survive periods of desiccation. In Britain, the sporophytes occur seasonally from September to December.

== Life cycle and growth ==
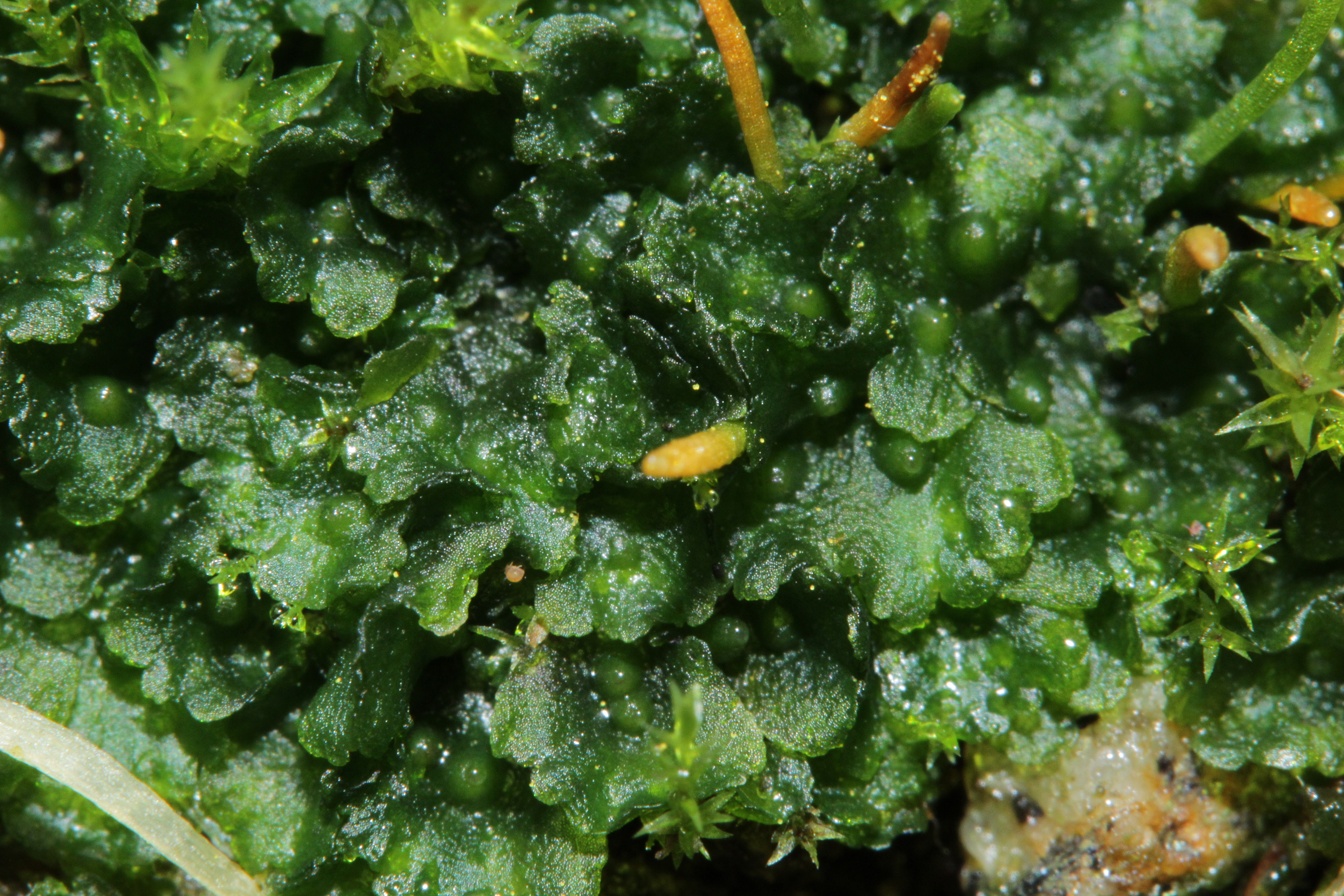
Gametophyte thalli showing characteristic rosette formation and branching pattern, with young yellowish sporophytes emerging

In temperate regions, P. carolinianus typically follows an annual life cycle, though it can persist as a facultative perennial in some regions like the southern Appalachians. The gametophytes show a mean growth rate of 0.1 mm per day under field conditions, enabling them to reach diameters of 20–30 mm over a three-month growing season. Individual plants can survive and grow for up to 18 months under favourable conditions.

Sexual reproduction begins commences weeks after germination as male and female reproductive structures develop on the same plant (monoicous condition). The male structures (antheridia) mature before the female structures (archegonia). Sporophytes emerge 3–4 weeks after germination once plants attain a minimum diameter of 3 mm. Each plant typically produces between 4.5 and 23 sporophytes over a growing season, with spores maturing progressively from the base to tip of each capsule.

== Similar species ==
Phaeoceros carolinianus differs from the similar species P. perpusillus and P. exiguus in several morphological features. While all three species are monoicous, P. carolinianus has a thicker thallus (8–13 cells thick in the middle versus 6–9 cells), taller involucres (2–4 mm versus 1–2 mm), and significantly longer capsules (2–4 cm versus less than 1.5 mm). Its spores are smaller (30–37 μm versus 40–47 μm) with distinctive ornamentation, showing minute papillae only in the central part of each proximal face. P. carolinianus also has notably longer pseudoelaters (length/width ratio >5) compared to the other species.

In field settings, P. carolinianus can be found growing alongside other hornwort species. In Croatia, it has been documented growing with Anthoceros agrestis and Notothylas orbicularis, forming part of the plant community Riccio glaucae-Anthocerotetum crispuli, which typically develops on temporary dry and loamy soils.

== Distribution ==
Phaeoceros carolinianus has a subcosmopolitan distribution, spanning temperate and tropical regions globally. In Europe, it is found from the Mediterranean to northern regions, in Asia it occurs across temperate and tropical areas, and in North America it ranges from Canada to Mexico and the Antilles. In the Southern Hemisphere, it has been documented in Australia, New Zealand, various parts of Africa, and South America including Colombia, Peru, Brazil, Chile, Bolivia, and Argentina.

In Australia, the species occurs across all Australian states including Australian Capital Territory, New South Wales, Queensland, South Australia, Tasmania, Victoria, and Western Australia, as well as Lord Howe Island and Norfolk Island.

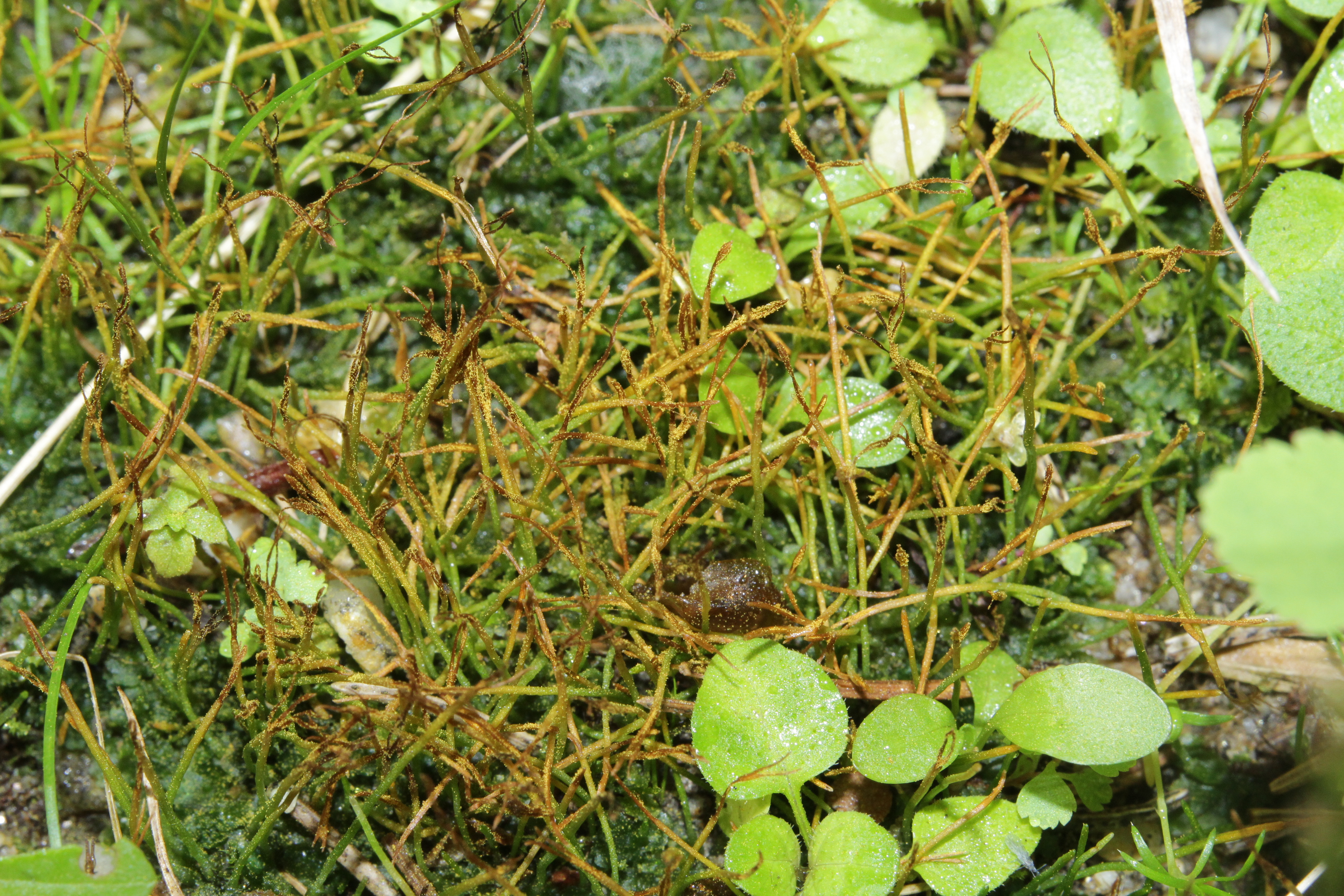
near Stillensteinklamm, Austria

In Southeast Europe, the species was historically sparsely documented. It was recorded in Croatia in 2018, where it was found growing on open ground with other hornworts in Central Croatia. Outside Croatia, in Southeast Europe it has been documented from Romania, where it is considered critically endangered, Slovenia, where it is considered data deficient, and Bulgaria, where it is also listed as data deficient.

In North America it ranges from Canada to Mexico and the Antilles, including Dominica. In the United States, the species is well-documented in Missouri, where it has been reported from 27 counties, making it the most frequently recorded hornwort species in the state. Its presence has been confirmed across diverse regions of Missouri, with specimens collected and verified over many decades from the early 1900s to recent times.

Despite considerable morphological variation across its range, the species maintains consistent defining characteristics, particularly its monoicous condition and distinctive spore ornamentation.

== Habitat and ecology ==
Phaeoceros carolinianus grows on bare soil, forming fans, rosettes, patches or mats that adhere to the substrate. It shows a preference for fresh to moist, sandy-loamy or sandy soils that are neutral to slightly acidic, and can grow in conditions ranging from full light to shade.

The species occurs in both natural and anthropogenic habitats. In nature, it grows along bush tracks, roadsides, and waterways banks, especially in damp, shaded areas. In Bolivia, it colonises wet soil and rock slopes with water seepage at elevations around 1,626 m (5,335 ft), forming rosettes 2–4 cm in diameter, while in Dominica it has been documented on shaded earth slopes at 600 m (2,000 ft) elevation.

In agricultural landscapes, it is particularly associated with cultivated fields, especially stubble fields after harvest, and less frequently in other crops such as corn, vegetables, or fallow fields. The species also colonises field margins, forest edges, ditches, path edges, and pond margins. In Switzerland, it occurs from colline to montane elevations (200–1,080 m (660–3,540 ft)), primarily in agricultural areas of the Central Plateau, Jura, and Southern Alps, where despite abundant spore production, populations typically remain relatively small and stable compared to other hornwort species.

The species is frequently associated with other bryophytes in the plant community Riccio glaucae-Anthocerotetum, particularly in areas with temporary dry and loamy soils. In Central Europe, it typically behaves as an annual species, being frost-sensitive and developing during summer to autumn months, though it may persist longer in sites that maintain sufficient moisture for continuous growth.

== Conservation ==
Phaeoceros carolinianus faces several conservation challenges across its range. In Europe, the species has experienced population declines over recent decades, primarily attributed to changes in agricultural practices. The main threats include intensification of farming methods, particularly earlier and more frequent tillage operations that reduce the time available for the species to complete its life cycle. The use of agricultural chemicals and fertilisers may also impact populations, though to a lesser extent.

In Switzerland, the species is classified as endangered (EN) and is legally protected nationwide. It has been designated as a species of medium national priority for conservation, requiring clear action plans and targeted species promotion measures. The species' conservation status varies across Southeast Europe, where it appears to be either rare or understudied. It is classified as critically endangered (CR) in Romania and data deficient (DD) in both Slovenia and Bulgaria. The abandonment of traditional agriculture and subsequent succession of arable land to woodland represents an additional threat to populations in some regions.

As an ephemeral species with specific habitat needs, P. carolinianus is especially vulnerable to land-use changes. The species requires temporarily open, disturbed ground with sufficient moisture, typically found in traditional agricultural settings. Modern intensive farming practices often do not provide suitable conditions for the completion of its life cycle, which requires several weeks from spore germination to mature sporophyte development. Conservation efforts are hindered by limited knowledge of its distribution and population dynamics in many regions, highlighting the need for comprehensive surveys and monitoring programs.

== Research use ==
Phaeoceros carolinianus has been developed as a genetically tractable experimental system, with successful Agrobacterium-mediated genetic transformation achieved in 2023. The species can be maintained in axenic (sterile) culture on KNOP medium and propagated vegetatively with monthly subculturing. Its simple thallus morphology and relatively flat growth make it useful for cellular imaging studies, particularly for investigating fundamental aspects of plant cell biology such as cell polarity, plasmodesmata-related processes, and cell division.

Several features make P. carolinianus particularly valuable for studying plant evolution and development. Its single chloroplast per cell (monoplastidic condition) with a pyrenoid-based carbon-concentrating mechanism is unique among land plants, offering insights into the evolution of photosynthetic systems. The species also forms symbiotic relationships with cyanobacteria, providing opportunities to study plant-microbe interactions that are relatively rare among land plants. The development of genetic transformation techniques for P. carolinianus has enabled the use of fluorescent proteins to study cellular structures and processes, including the visualisation of organelles such as mitochondria, chloroplasts, and the endoplasmic reticulum.
