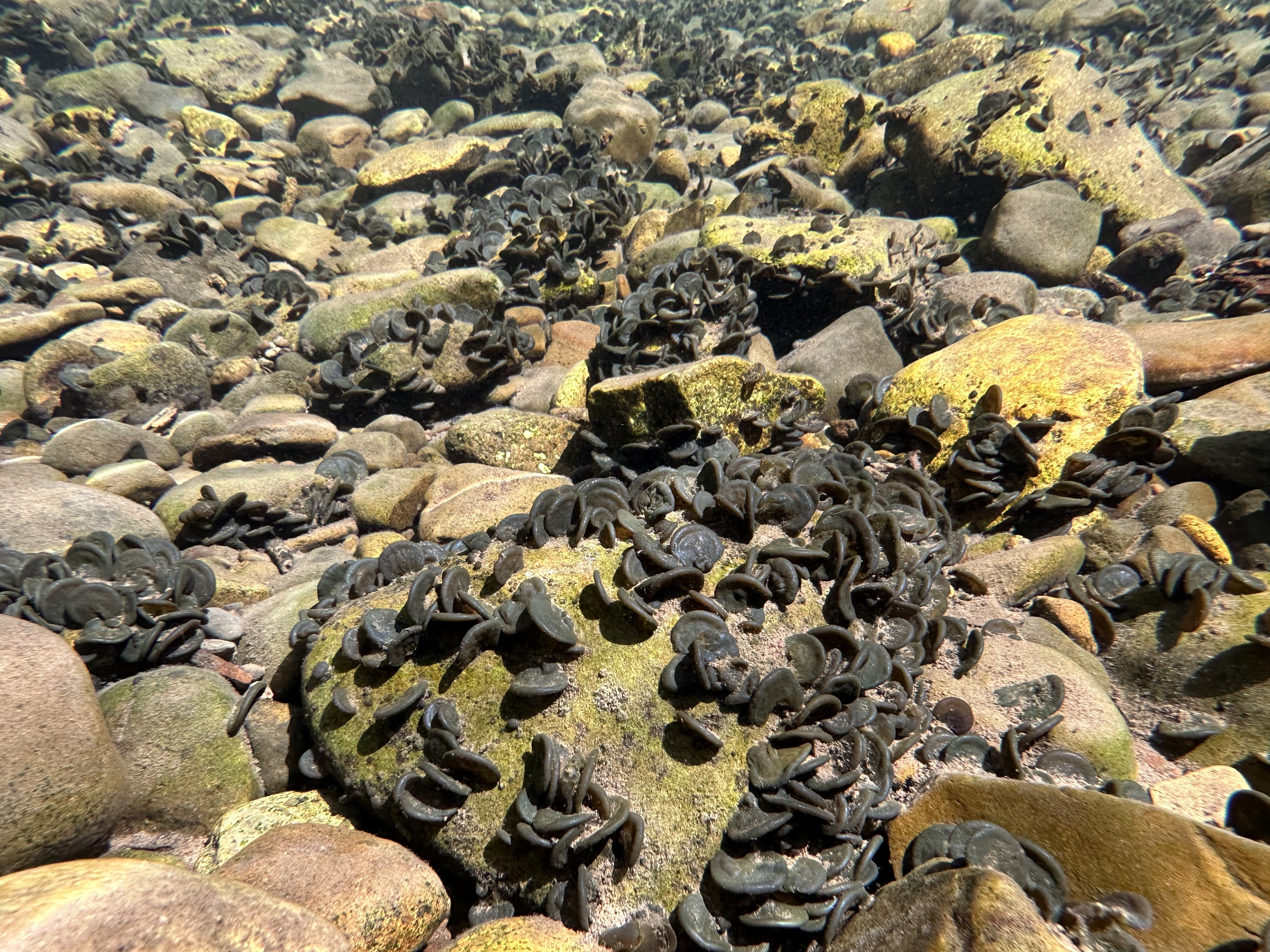

Scientific classification
- Domain: Bacteria
- Kingdom: Bacillati
- Phylum: Cyanobacteriota
- Class: Cyanophyceae
- Order: Nostocales
- Family: Nostocaceae
- Genus: Nostoc
- Species: N. parmelioides

Binomial name
- Nostoc parmelioides Kützing ex Bornet & Flahault 1886

= Nostoc parmelioides =

Species of cyanobacterium

Nostoc parmelioides is a species of cyanobacterium in the family Nostocaceae. It is notable for its symbiosis with a midge larva, Cricotopus nostocicola.
