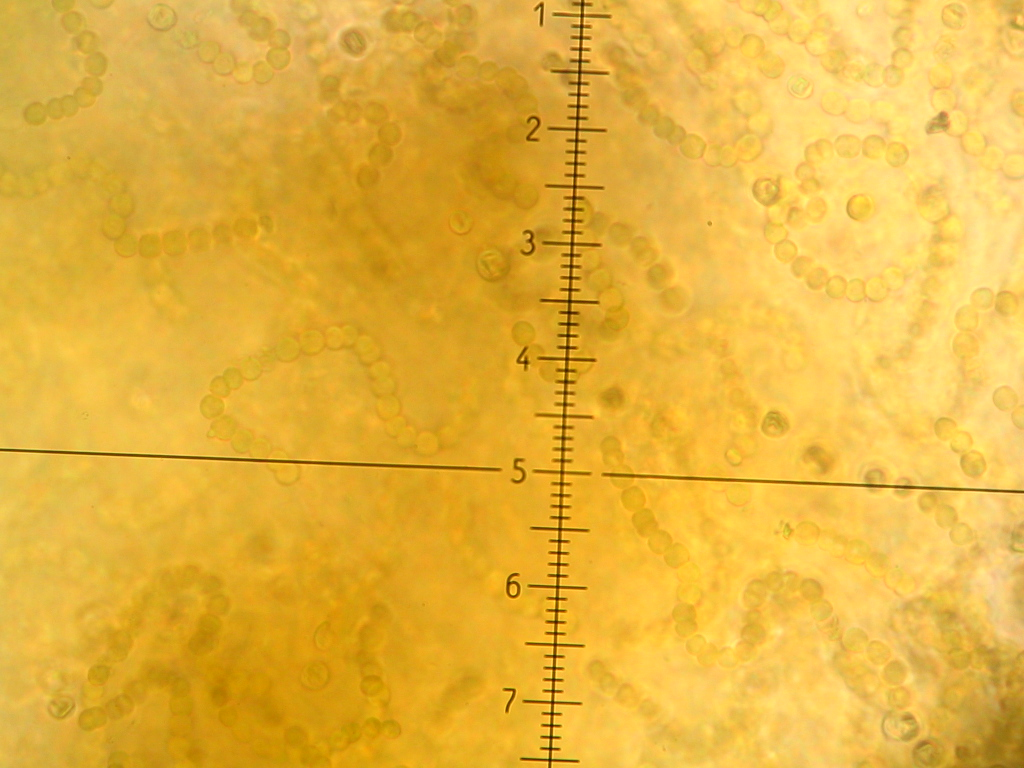
- Nostoc flagelliforme under a microscope

Scientific classification
- Domain: Bacteria
- Kingdom: Bacillati
- Phylum: Cyanobacteriota
- Class: Cyanophyceae
- Order: Nostocales
- Family: Nostocaceae
- Genus: Nostoc
- Species: N. flagelliforme

Binomial name
- Nostoc flagelliforme Harv. ex Molinari, Calvo-Pérez & Guiry, 2016

Synonyms
- Nematonostoc flagelliforme (Bornet & Flahault) Nylander ex Elenkin 1934; Nostoc commune var. flagelliforme Bornet & Flahault, 1886

= Fat choy =

Species of edible, terrestrial cyanobacterium

Fat choy
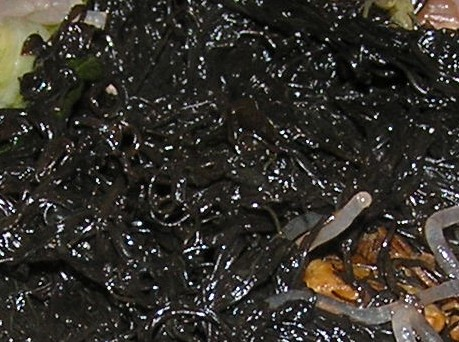
- Traditional Chinese: 髮菜
- Simplified Chinese: 发菜
- Literal meaning: "hair vegetable"
Transcriptions
Standard Mandarin
- Hanyu Pinyin: fàcài
- IPA: [fâ.tsʰâɪ]
Yue: Cantonese
- Yale Romanization: faat choi
- Jyutping: faat3 coi3

Alternative Chinese name
- Traditional Chinese: 頭毛菜
Transcriptions
Southern Min
- Hokkien POJ: thâu-mn̂g-chhài

Fat choy (traditional Chinese: 髮菜; simplified Chinese: 发菜; pinyin: fàcài; Jyutping: faat³ coi³; Nostoc flagelliforme) is a terrestrial cyanobacterium (a type of photosynthetic bacteria) that is used as a vegetable in Chinese cuisine. When dried, the product has the appearance of black hair. For that reason, its name in Chinese means 'hair vegetable'. When soaked, fat choy has a soft texture which is like very fine vermicelli.

== Production ==
Fat choy grows on the ground in the Gobi Desert and the Qinghai Plateau. Over-harvesting on the Mongolian steppes has furthered erosion and desertification in those areas. The Chinese government has limited its harvesting, which has caused its price to increase.

Commercially available fat choy has been found to be adulterated with strands of a non-cellular starchy material, with other additives and dyes. Real fat choy is dark green in color, while the counterfeit fat choy appears black.

== Use ==
=== China ===
Its name in Cantonese sounds like a Cantonese phrase meaning 'struck it rich' (though the second syllable, coi, has a different tone) -- this is found, for example, in the Cantonese saying, "Gung1 hei2 faat3 coi4" (恭喜發財, meaning 'wishing you prosperity'), often proclaimed during Chinese New Year. Therefore, it is a popular ingredient for Chinese New Year dishes, such as in the reunion dinner. It is mostly used in Cantonese cuisine and Buddhist cuisine. It is sometimes used as a hot pot ingredient.

Due to its high price, fat choy is considered a luxury food, and only used in limited occasions. It is not eaten as a staple.

== Health effects ==
N. flagelliforme has no nutritional value, and also contains β-methylamino-L-alanine (BMAA), a toxic amino acid that could affect the normal functions of nerve cells and is linked to degenerative diseases such as ALS, Alzheimer's, Parkinson's, and dementia. Not all real fat choy samples contain BMAA according to a 2009 study, with the maximum concentration being 658.5 ng/g. Imitation fat choy does not contain BMAA.

Across a 28-day duration, laboratory rats fed N. flagelliforme and the control group did not exhibit significant differences in any toxicological parameters.

The algae and its extracts reduce the inflammatory action of white blood cells, specifically macrophages and splenocytes, in vitro.
