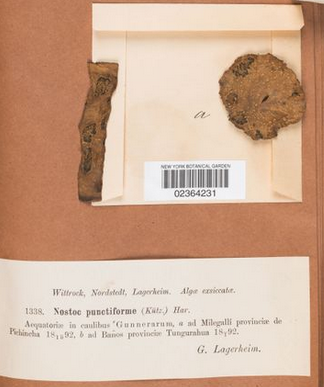

Scientific classification
- Domain: Bacteria
- Kingdom: Bacillati
- Phylum: Cyanobacteriota
- Class: Cyanophyceae
- Order: Nostocales
- Family: Nostocaceae
- Genus: Nostoc
- Species: N. punctiforme

Binomial name
- Nostoc punctiforme (Kütz.) Har.

= Nostoc punctiforme =

Species of bacterium

Nostoc punctiforme is a species of filamentous cyanobacterium. Under non-limiting nutritional environmental conditions, its filaments are composed of photosynthetic vegetative cells; upon nutrient limitation, some of these cells undergo differentiation into heterocysts, akinetes or hormogonia.

N. punctiforme is one of the Nostoc strains able to maintain diazotrophic symbiosis with higher plants such as the bryophytes Anthocerus punctatus and Blasia pusilla, water ferns from the genus Azolla, the cycads Macrozamia spp., and the angiosperm Gunnera.

== Applications ==
Modified Nostoc punctiforme intein (Npu DnaE split intein) is used for a self-cleaving protein purification (e.g. iCapTag™).
