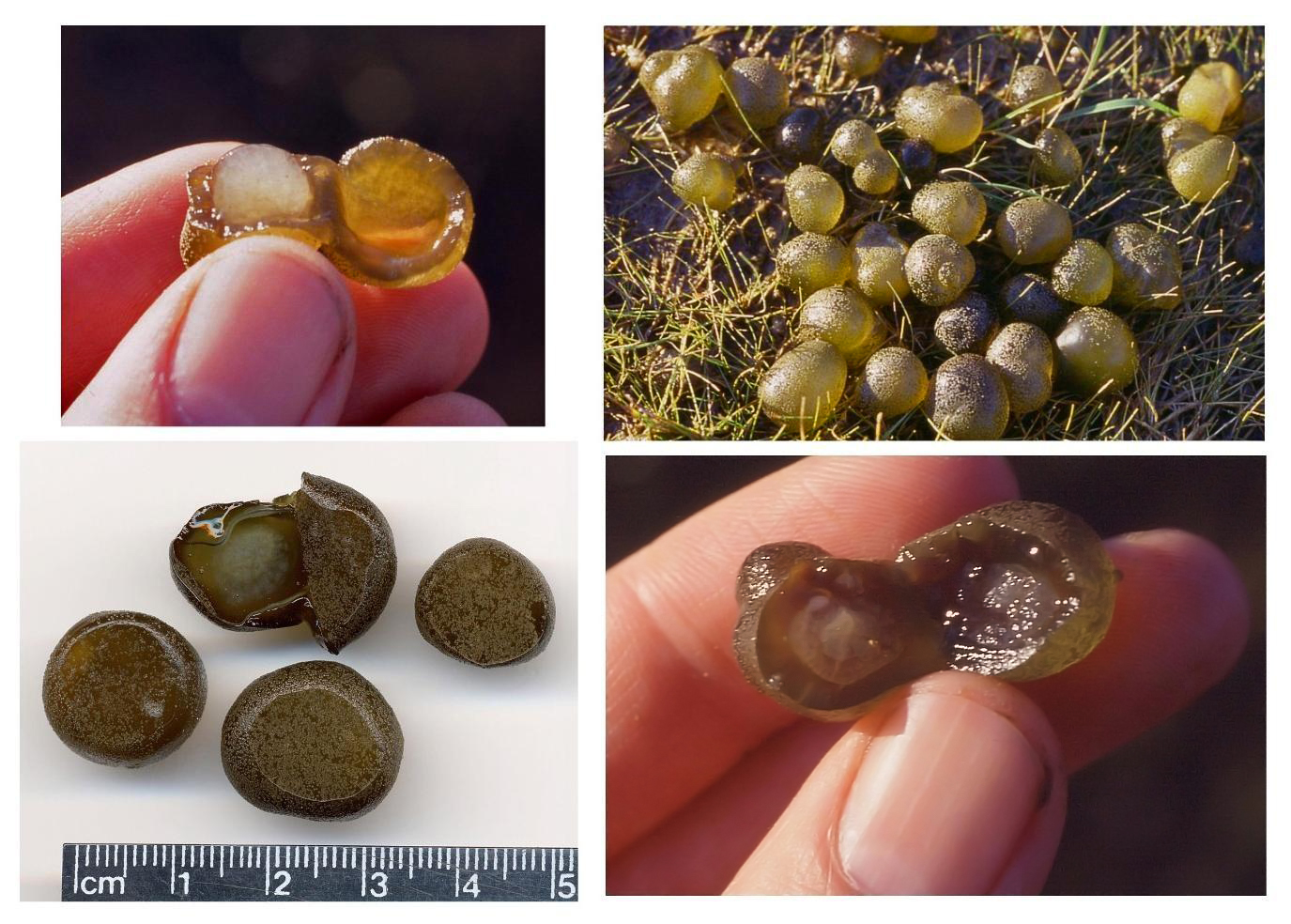

Scientific classification
- Domain: Bacteria
- Kingdom: Bacillati
- Phylum: Cyanobacteriota
- Class: Cyanophyceae
- Order: Nostocales
- Family: Nostocaceae
- Genus: Nostoc
- Species: N. pruniforme

Binomial name
- Nostoc pruniforme C.Agardh ex Bornet & Flahault

= Nostoc pruniforme =

Mare's eggs

Species of bacterium

Nostoc pruniforme (Mare's eggs) are a species of cyanobacterium. These freshwater bacteria grow in colonies which take the form of dark green, gelatinous spheres with a smooth surface like a plum. It is common and widely distributed both geographically and ecologically in oligotrophic and mesotrophic freshwaters in temperate and sub-Arctic regions.

In temperate lakes, N. pruniforme appears to grow in diameter from ~0.2 cm in late spring to 2–3 cm in midsummer and it can rapidly die off, supposedly because of attacks by viruses or bacteria at high summer temperatures (K. Sand-Jensen, unpubl. data). In contrast, in a cold (4 °C), nutrient-poor spring in Oregon, USA, N. pruniforme reached a handball size of 15–17 cm in diameter and weighed 2.6 kg after sustained slow growth for 9–14 years. Very large colonies are also found in cold transparent lakes in Greenland (K. Sand-Jensen, unpubl. data). In addition to their larger size and persistence, they differ from Danish temperate specimens by having a more solid surface and a denser gel.
