= Nostoc commune var. sphaeroides =

Scientific classification
- Domain: Bacteria
- Phylum: Cyanobacteria
- Class: Cyanophyceae
- Order: Nostocales
- Family: Nostocaceae
- Genus: Nostoc
- Species: N. commune
- Variety: N. c. var. sphaeroides

Trinomial name
- Nostoc commune var. sphaeroides Kutzing

Variety of bacteria

Nostoc commune var. sphaeroides is an edible cyanobacterium found in diverse habitats such as lakes and rivers. It is used as a food and nutritional supplement and has reputed pharmaceutical properties.
