= Wollea =

Scientific classification
- Domain: Bacteria
- Phylum: Cyanobacteria
- Class: Cyanophyceae
- Order: Nostocales
- Family: Nostocaceae
- Genus: Wollea; Bornet & Flahault, 1886

Species
- Wollea bharadwajae Wollea cylindrica Wollea lamnae Wollea lemnae Wollea saccata

Genus of bacteria

Wollea is a genus of filamentous, heterocystous cyanobacteria that form macroscopic colonies in freshwater habitats. The genus produces akinetes and is known to reproduce with hormogonia.

The type species for the genus is Wollea saccata (Wolle) Bornet & Flahault, 1886.
