= Amorphonostoc =

Scientific classification
- Domain: Bacteria
- Kingdom: Bacillati
- Phylum: Cyanobacteriota
- Class: Cyanophyceae
- Order: Nostocales
- Family: Nostocaceae
- Genus: Amorphonostoc; Elenkin

Genus of bacteria

Amorphonostoc is a genus of cyanobacteria belonging to the family Nostocaceae.

The genus was first described by Alexander Elenkin in 1937.

Species:

- Amorphonostoc paludosum (Kützing ex Bornet & Flahault) Elenkin
- Amorphonostoc punctiforme (Hariot) Elenkin
- Amorphonostoc punctiforme (Kützing) Elenkin
