= Flavodoxin =

Protein family

Flavodoxins (Fld) are small, soluble electron-transfer proteins. Flavodoxins contain flavin mononucleotide as prosthetic group. The structure of flavodoxin is characterized by a five-stranded parallel beta sheet, surrounded by five alpha helices. They have been isolated from prokaryotes, cyanobacteria, and some eukaryotic algae.

== Background ==
Originally found in cyanobacteria and clostridia, flavodoxins were discovered over 50 years ago. These proteins evolved from an anaerobic environment, due to selective pressures. Ferredoxin, another redox protein, was the only protein able to be used in this manner. However, when oxygen became present in the environment, iron became limited. Ferredoxin is iron-dependant as well as oxidant-sensitive. Under these limited iron conditions, ferredoxin was no longer preferred. Flavodoxin on the other hand is the opposite of these traits, as it is oxidant-resistant and has iron-free isofunctional counterparts. Therefore, for some time flavodoxin was the primary redox protein. Now however, when ferredoxin and flavodoxin are present in the same genome, ferredoxin is still used but under low iron conditions, flavodoxin is induced.

== Structure ==
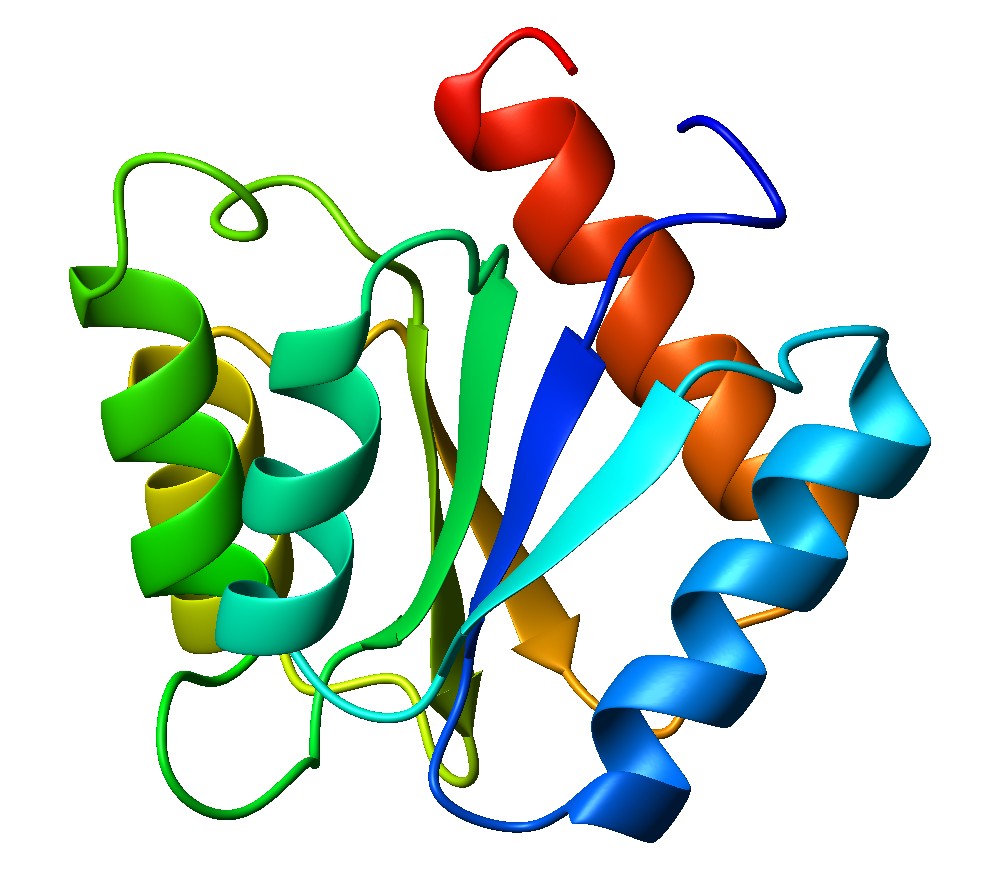
3-D structure of flavodoxin protein

Three forms of flavodoxin exist: Oxidized, (OX) semiquinone, (SQ) and hydroquinone (HQ). While relatively small (M_{w} = 15-22 kDa), flavodoxins exist in "long" and "short" chain classifications. Short chain flavodoxins contain between 140 and 180 amino acid residues, while long chain flavodoxins include a 20 amino acid insertion into the last beta-strand. These residues form a loop which may be used to increase the binding affinity of flavin mononucleotide as well as assist in the formation of folded intermediates. However, it is still not certain what the loops true function is. In addition, the flavin mononucleotide is non-covalently bound to the flavodoxin protein and works to shuttle electrons.

== Medical applications ==
Helicobacter pylori (Hp), the most prevalent human gastric pathogen, requires flavodoxins in its essential POR (pyruvate oxidoreductase enzyme complex) used in pyruvate decarboxylation. Most flavodoxins have a large hydrophobic residue such as tryptophan near the FMN, but Hp has an alanine residue instead, allowing for a pocket of solute to form. Current research is being done to identify non toxic, Hp specific flavodoxin inhibitors for the purpose of treating infection.

== Mechanism ==
Flavodoxins require a highly negative redox potential to be active. The semiquinone conformation is stabilized by a hydrogen bond to the N-5 position of the flavin. This bond, as well as a common tryptophan residue near the binding site, aid in lowering SQ reactivity. The hydroquinone form is forced into a planar conformation, destabilizing it. Electron transfer occurs at the dimethylbenzene ring of the FMN.

== Flavodoxins in Cyanobacteria ==
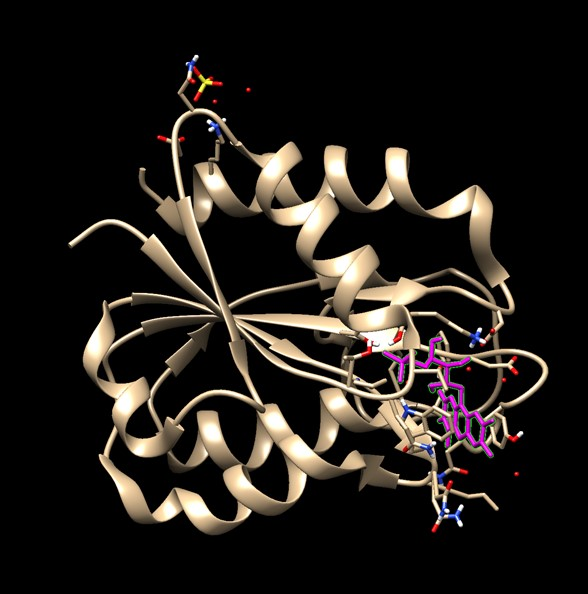
(RCF-1) Trigonal form of recombinant oxidized long chain flavodoxin in Anabaena/Nostoc sp. The active site is characterized by a FMN (flavin mono-nucleotide) cofactor highlighted in magenta. SO4 residue highlighted in yellow. As with most flavodoxins, the residues near the binding site are large and hydrophobic.

In cyanobacteria such as Nostoc sp., flavodoxins are heterocyst-specific, and used in photosystem 1 to deliver electrons to nitrogenase, as well as reducing N2 and NADP+, nitrogen fixation and H2 formation.
