= Nostoc thermotolerans =

Scientific classification
- Domain: Bacteria
- Phylum: Cyanobacteria
- Class: Cyanophyceae
- Order: Nostocales
- Family: Nostocaceae
- Genus: Nostoc
- Species: N. thermotolerans

Binomial name
- Nostoc thermotolerans Suradkar et al. (2017)

Species of cyanobacteria

Nostoc thermotolerans was a newly isolated strain of cyanobacteria cultured in Mandsaur, Madhya Pradesh, India as of 2017. In habitat, these cyanobacteria live in macroscopic light blue-green mats found in the crevices of small hillocks. This Nostoc species lives in an extremely hot and dry environment, which the name implies. Thermotolerans (heat - tolerating) (Thermè (heat), tolerans (tolerating)). The environmental temperature ranges from 43 °C (day) to 29 °C (night) and the average soil pH is 7.3 [1].

== Phenotypic characteristics ==
Nostoc thermotolerans are gram-negative photoautotrophs. Non-motile, barrel-shaped cells that form filaments called trichomes. Trichomes usually consist of 30-150 cells with a combination of vegetative and heterocyte cells. Vegetative cells are carbon fixing cells, which are 3.6 μm in length and 3.4 - 3.8 μm in width. Heterocytes are specialized nitrogen fixing cells, which are 4.7 – 6.0 μm in length and 3.3 - 5.2 μm in width [1].

== Novel species characteristics ==
This strain was able be isolated in lab allowing documentation of morphological and phenotypical analysis. DNA was extracted from culture using Himedia Ultrasensitive Spin Purification Kit (MB505). Sanger method sequencing was used for 16S rRNA gene (1476 bp), rbcl gene, ropC1 gene and niƒD gene sequencing. 16S-23S internal transcribed spacer (ITS) was used for difference in folding patterns. The methods used by Suradkar et al. (2017) suggest statistical difference for new novel strain of Nostoc; Nostoc thermotolerns.
