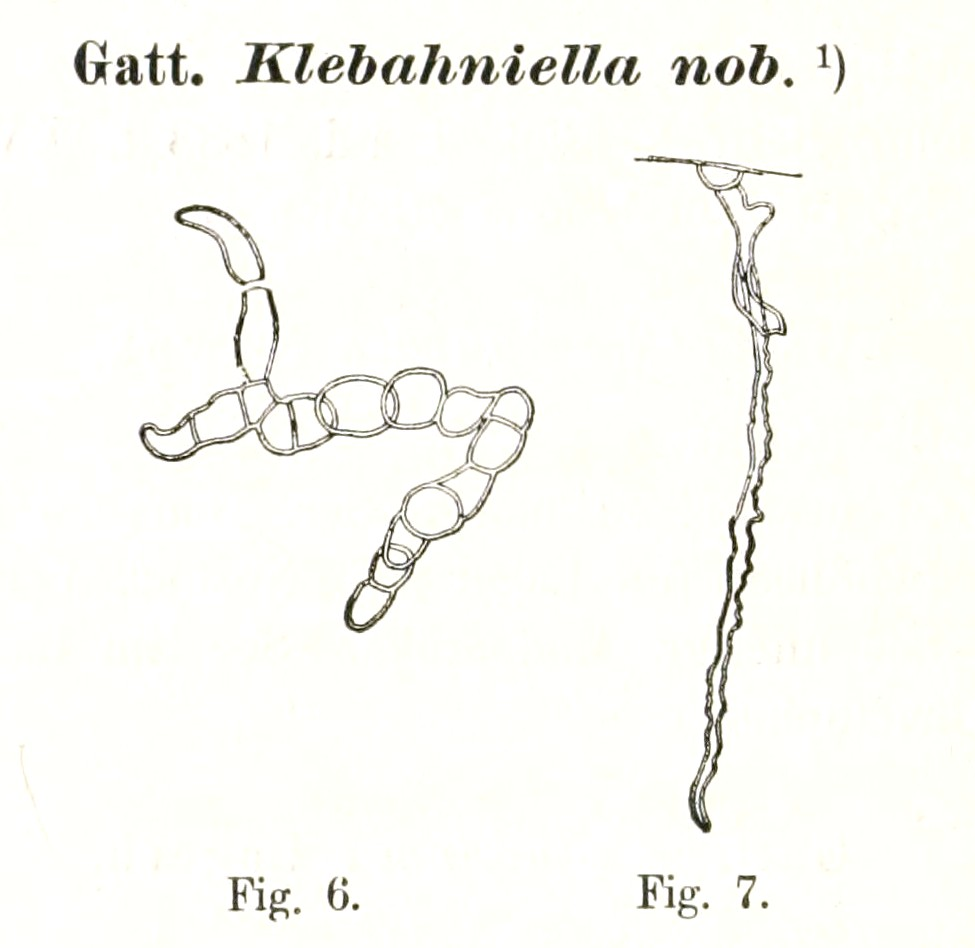
- Klebahniella elegans

Scientific classification
- Clade: Viridiplantae
- Division: Chlorophyta
- Class: Chlorophyceae
- Order: Chaetophorales
- Family: Chaetophoraceae
- Genus: Klebahniella; E. Lemmermann, 1895
- Species: K. elegans

Binomial name
- Klebahniella elegans Klebahniella

= Klebahniella =

Genus of algae

Klebahniella is a genus of green algae in the family Chaetophoraceae, containing the sole species Klebahniella elegans. It is a freshwater alga that occurs in or within the gelatinous colony of Nostoc verrucosum, a cyanobacterium.

The genus name of Klebahniella is in honour of Heinrich Klebahn (1859–1942), who was a German mycologist and phytopathologist.

The genus was circumscribed by Ernst Johann Lemmermann in Forschungsber. Biol. Stat. Plön vol.3 on page 32 in 1895.

The taxonomic status of Klebahniella is doubtful. It is possible that Klebahniella is merely Stigeoclonium deformed due to growth within the colony of Nostoc.
