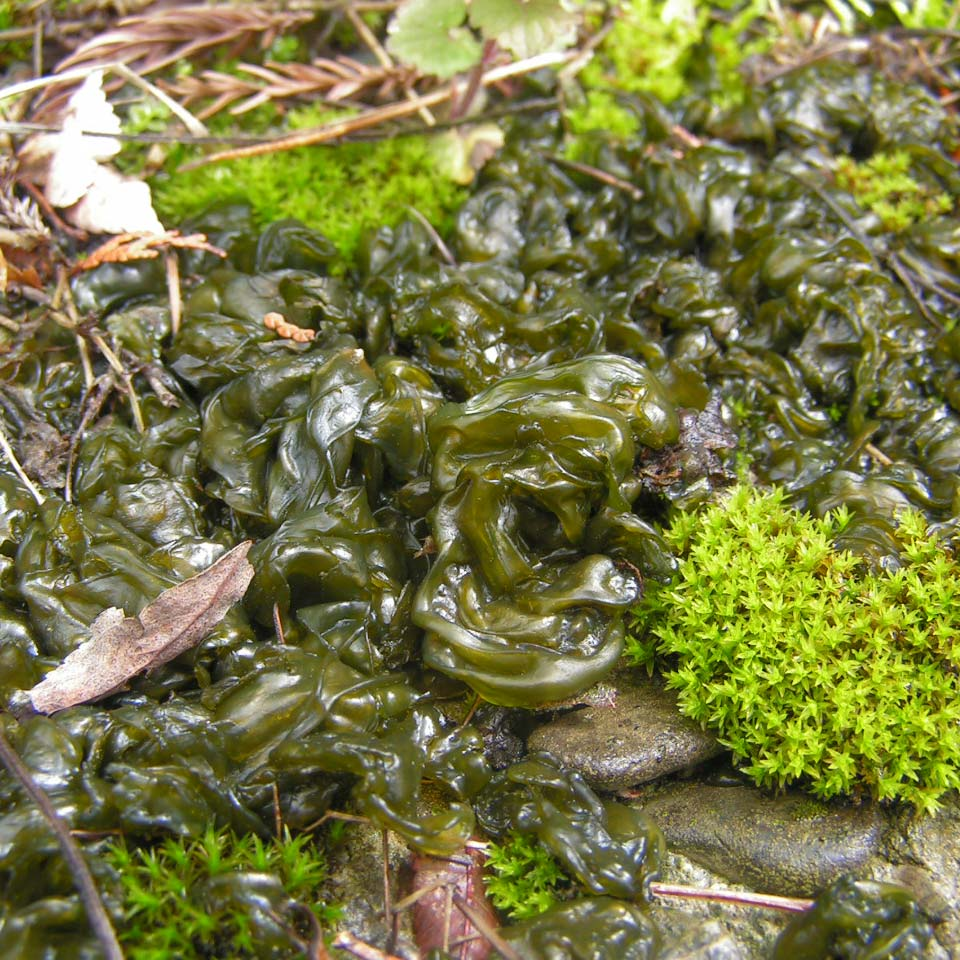
- Nostoc commune

Scientific classification
- Domain: Bacteria
- Kingdom: Bacillati
- Phylum: Cyanobacteriota
- Class: Cyanophyceae
- Order: Nostocales
- Family: Nostocaceae
- Genus: Nostoc; Vaucher, 1888, ex Bornet and Flahaul

Species
- List: Nostoc agglutinans Meneghini ex Kützing, 1849; Nostoc alatosporum Sant'Anna et al., 2007; Nostoc album N.L.Gardner, 1927; Nostoc alpinum Kützing, 1843; Nostoc ambiceps C.-C.Jao, 1940; Nostoc amplissimum Setchell, 1899; Nostoc anisococcum Sprengel, 1827; Nostoc antarcticum West & G.S.West, 1911; Nostoc apuanum De Notaris, 1869; Nostoc arctum Kützing, 1847; Nostoc arenarium Desmazières, 1865; Nostoc austinii H.C.Wood, 1873; Nostoc belmonticum C.G.M.Archibald, 1967; Nostoc bicalyptratum Skuja, 1937; Nostoc bornetii Gain, 1911; Nostoc borzioides S.Skinner & T.J.Entwisle, 2002; Nostoc brittoni N.L.Gardner, 1927; Nostoc caeruleum Lyngbye ex Bornet & Flahault, 1886; Nostoc caladarium H.C.Wood, 1868; Nostoc calcicola Brébisson ex Bornet & Flahault, 1886; Nostoc carneum C.Agardh ex Bornet & Flahault, 1886; Nostoc catenatum P.J.L.Dangeard, 1949; Nostoc cesatii Balsamo, 1863; Nostoc ciniflonum Tournefort ex Bornet, 1880; Nostoc citrisporum Prasad & Mehrotra, 1976; Nostoc coimbatorense Laloraya & Mitra, 1974; Nostoc comminutum Kützing, 1850; Nostoc commune Vaucher ex Bornet & Flahault, 1888; Nostoc conglomeratum Hirose, 1962; Nostoc copiosum Kogan & Jazkulieva, 1972; Nostoc cordubense C.H.Prosperi, 1985; Nostoc crassisporum Meneghini, 1837; Nostoc crassisporum Geitler, 1933; Nostoc cristatum Bailey, 1847; Nostoc cycadae Maruyama & Fukushima, 1963; Nostoc delpinoi Borzì, 1878; Nostoc depressum H.C.Wood, 1873; Nostoc desertorum Reháková & Johansen, 2007; Nostoc diamorphoticum Itzigsohn, 1857; Nostoc diplonema Montagne, 1857; Nostoc disciforme F.E.Fritsch, 1912; Nostoc edaphicum Kondrateva, 1962; Nostoc edule Montagne & Berkeley ex Bornet & Flahault, 1886; Nostoc elgonense Naumann, 1925; Nostoc ellipsoideum N.L.Gardner, 1927; Nostoc ellipsosporum Rabenhorst ex Bornet & Flahault, 1886; Nostoc endophytum Bornet & Flahault, 1886; Nostoc epilithicum Ercegovic, 1925; Nostoc expansum Harvey & Bailey, 1851; Nostoc filarzskyi G.De Toni, 1936; Nostoc flagelliforme Harvey ex Molinari-Novoa, Calvo-Pérez & Guiry, 2016; Nostoc flavicans Bory de Saint-Vincent, 1827; Nostoc fluviatile Liljeblad, 1816; Nostoc foliaceum Mougeot ex Bornet & Flahault, 1886; Nostoc fonticola Brabez, 1941; Nostoc fragiforme (Roth) Brébisson, 1870; Nostoc fuscescens F.E.Fritsch, 1912; Nostoc fuscum Kützing, 1863; Nostoc gelatinosum Schousboe ex Bornet & Flahault, 1886; Nostoc ghotgewadense G.R.Hegde & K.Somanna, 1992; Nostoc glomeratum Kützing, 1850; Nostoc granulare (Kützing) Rabenhorst, 1865; Nostoc gregarium Thuret ex Kützing, 1849; Nostoc gymnosphaericum Kützing, 1843; Nostoc hatei S.C.Dixit, 1936; Nostoc heterothrix Zeller, 1873; Nostoc humifusum Carmichael ex Bornet & Flahault, 1886; Nostoc hyalinum Roemer, 1845; Nostoc hyalinum A.W.Bennett, 1886; Nostoc hydrocoleoides Reinsch, 1876; Nostoc imperfectum Schwabe & El Ayouty, 1966; Nostoc indistinguendum Reháková & J.R.Johansen, 2007; Nostoc insulare Borzì, 1907; Nostoc interbryum Sant'Anna et al., 2007; Nostoc intestinale G.S.An, 1992; Nostoc inundatum Kützing, 1843; Nostoc kihlmanii Lemmermann, 1900; Nostoc koraiense G.S.An, 1990; Nostoc krishnamurthyi S.Chandra, 2005; Nostoc lacerum Kützing, 1843; Nostoc lacunosum Montagne, 1850; Nostoc lacustre Kützing, 1843; Nostoc leptonema Reinsch, 1876; Nostoc letestui Frémy, 1930; Nostoc lichenoides Vaucher ex Reháková & J.R.Johansen, 2007; Nostoc limosum Zeller, 1873; Nostoc linckia Bornet ex Bornet & Flahault, 1886; Nostoc littorale Kützing, 1842; Nostoc locularis G.S.An, 1992; Nostoc longstaffi F.E.Fritsch, 1912; Nostoc lophotelos G.S.An, 1992; Nostoc maculiforme Bornet & Flahault, 1888; Nostoc mamillosum C.-C.Jao, 1940; Nostoc maramorgellons Smith & Gerbaux, 2020; Nostoc margaritaceum (Kützing) Rabenhorst, 1865; Nostoc membranaceum N.L.Gardner, 1927; Nostoc microscopicum Carmichael ex Bornet & Flahault, 1886; Nostoc microtis Montagne, 1839; Nostoc minimum Currey, 1858; Nostoc minutissimum Kützing ex Bornet & Flahault, 1886; Nostoc minutum Desmazières ex Bornet & Flahault, 1886; Nostoc molle C.Agardh, 1827; Nostoc mougeotii Brébisson ex Kützing, 1849; Nostoc myriococcum Montagne, 1857; Nostoc nivale Kützing, 1849; Nostoc notarisii Franzoni, 1865; Nostoc nylstromicum Claassen, 1961; Nostoc opalinum A.W.Bennett, 1890; Nostoc oryzae (F.E.Fritsch) J.Komárek & K.Anagnostidis, 1989; Nostoc palmelioides Kützing; Nostoc paludosum Kützing ex Bornet & Flahault, 1886; Nostoc papillosum Kurz, 1870; Nostoc paradoxum Welwitsch ex West & G.S.West, 1897; Nostoc parietinum Rabenhorst, 1863; Nostoc parmelioides Kützing ex Bornet & Flahault, 1886; Nostoc parvulum C.-C.Jao, 1940; Nostoc passerinianum Bornet & Thuret ex Bornet & Flahault, 1886; Nostoc pellucidum Kützing, 1843; Nostoc peloponnesiacum Kützing, 1849; Nostoc peltigerae Letellier, 1918; Nostoc polysaccum Reinsch, 1876; Nostoc polysporum Reinsch, 1876; Nostoc prismaticum Cesati, 1865; Nostoc pruniforme C.Agardh ex Bornet & Flahault, 1886; Nostoc pseudogelatinosum Claassen, 1961; Nostoc punctatum H.C.Wood, 1873; Nostoc punctiforme Hariot, 1891; Nostoc purpurascens Kützing, 1843; Nostoc purpureum Dickie, 1874; Nostoc ramosum Ercegovic, 1925; Nostoc repandum West & G.S.West, 1897; Nostoc reticulatum Roussel, 1806; Nostoc riabuschinskii Elenkin, 1914; Nostoc rupestre Kützing, 1849; Nostoc salsum Kützing, 1843; Nostoc saxatile Zeller, 1873; Nostoc segawae Okada, 1932; Nostoc sergianum Borzì, 1892; Nostoc shensiense C.C.Jao, 1948; Nostoc simulans N.L.Gardner, 1927; Nostoc sinuatum G.S.An, 1992; Nostoc sphaericum Vaucher ex Bornet & Flahault, 1886; Nostoc sphaeroides Kützing ex Bornet & Flahault, 1886; Nostoc sphaerosporum N.L.Gardner, 1927; Nostoc spinosum Tiwari, 1979; Nostoc subtilissimum Reinsch, 1890; Nostoc symbioticum F.V.Wettstein, 1915; Nostoc tenax Thuret, 1874; Nostoc tenuissimum (Kützing) Rabenhorst, 1865; Nostoc thermophilum Vouk, 1916; Nostoc thermotolerans Suradkar, 2017; Nostoc tibeticum C.-C.Jao & Y.Y.Lee, 1974; Nostoc torulosum Hirose, 1962; Nostoc trentepohlii Mohr, 1806; Nostoc tuberculosum Kützing, 1843; Nostoc undulatum Archibald, 1967; Nostoc vaillantii Behre, 1953; Nostoc variegatum Moore, 1841; Nostoc verrucosum Vaucher ex Bornet & Flahault, 1886; Nostoc vesicarium A.B.Frank, 1886; Nostoc viride Sant'Anna et al., 2007; Nostoc vulgare Schrank, 1812; Nostoc wartisporum Prasad et al., 1977; Nostoc wichmannii Weber-van Bosse, 1913; Nostoc willei N.L.Gardner, 1927; Nostoc wollnyanum Richter, 1884; Nostoc zetterstedtii Areschoug ex Bornet & Flahault, 1886

= Nostoc =

Nostoc Temporal range: 423–0 Ma

Genus of cyanobacteria

Nostoc is the most common genus of cyanobacteria found in a variety of both aquatic and terrestrial environments that may form colonies composed of filaments of moniliform cells in a gelatinous sheath of polysaccharides. Owing to its appearance, it is commonly known as star jelly, troll's butter, spit of moon, fallen star, witch's butter (not to be confused with the fungi commonly known as witches' butter), and witch's jelly. Nostoc may also grow symbiotically within the tissues of plants, providing nitrogen to its host through the action of terminally differentiated cells known as heterocysts. Nostoc is a genus that includes many species that are diverse in morphology, habitat distribution, and ecological function. Nostoc can be found in soil, on moist rocks, at the bottom of lakes and springs, and rarely in marine habitats. It may also be found in terrestrial temperate, desert, tropical, or polar environments.

The name Nostoc was coined by Paracelsus and is a combination of the English nostril and German Nasenloch "nose hole, nostril", likely due to appearance of many species' colonies being similar to nasal mucus. When it is on the ground, a Nostoc colony is ordinarily not seen, but after a rain, it swells up into a conspicuous, jellylike mass, which was once thought to have fallen from the sky, hence the popular names, like star jelly, troll's butter, and witch's butter mentioned above.

== Morphology ==
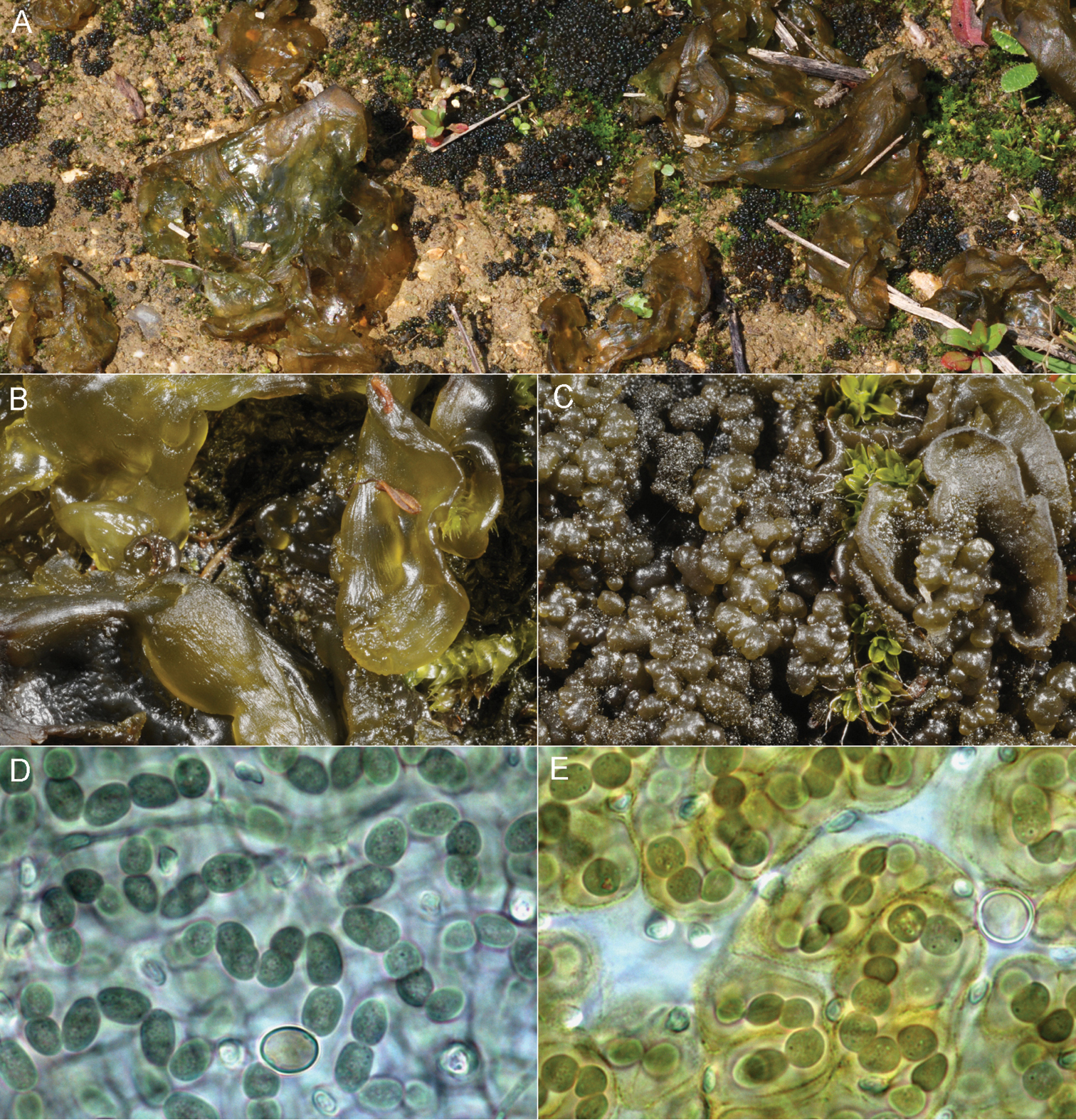
Nostoc strains

Nostoc are a genus of Gram-negative photosynthetic cyanobacteria. Many species of Nostoc possess an outer layer and extensive inner matrix of polysaccharides, giving them their "jelly-like" or gelatinous appearance, and also help to protect them from their environment and can assist in the absorption of moisture. This allows them to survive stressful conditions such as fluctuating temperatures, drought, salt stress, desiccation, UV radiation, and infection by pathogens. Some species within the genus also have nitrogen-fixing heterocyst filaments enclosed in this membrane.

Many members of the Nostoc genus form colonies. These colonies can reach several centimeters in diameter. These colonies consist of mats or gelatinous masses created by aggregated trichomes that can appear in a range of colors (depending on the species) such as brown, yellow, or green.

Additionally, some species of Nostoc are able to enter quiescent stages, further aiding in their survival of adverse conditions, and allowing them to resume metabolism when re-hydrated.

== Ecology ==
=== Habitat and distribution ===
Nostoc can be found in a variety of environments, both terrestrial and aquatic, depending on the species. Their polysaccharide outer layer and matrix allow them to survive and thrive in a variety of conditions and habitats including deserts, semideserts, grasslands, polar, and tropical regions depending on the particular species of Nostoc. In terms of aquatic environments, Nostoc has been documented to be naturally found in marine water and fresh water, as well as brackish water.

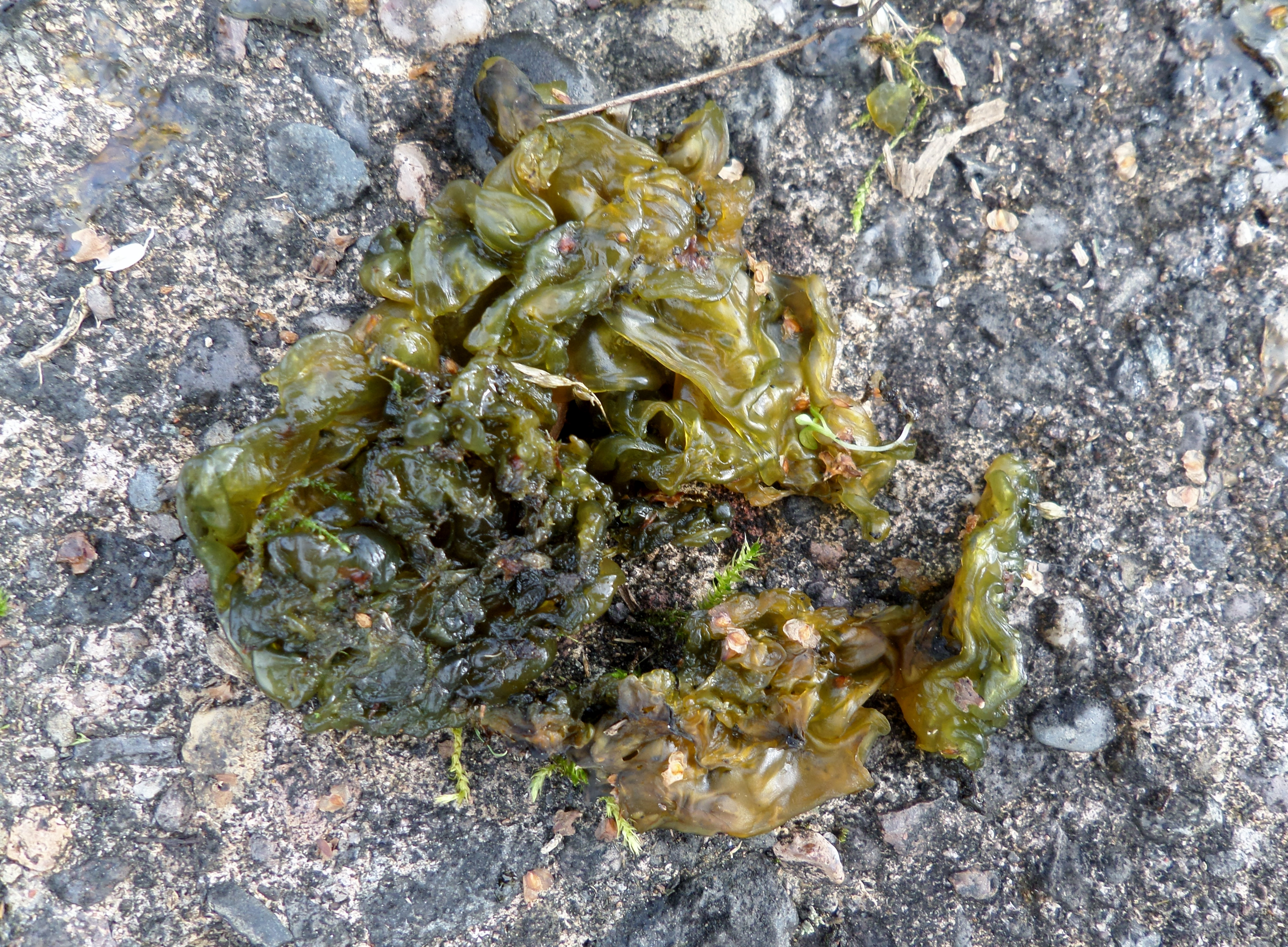
Terrestrial colony of Nostoc

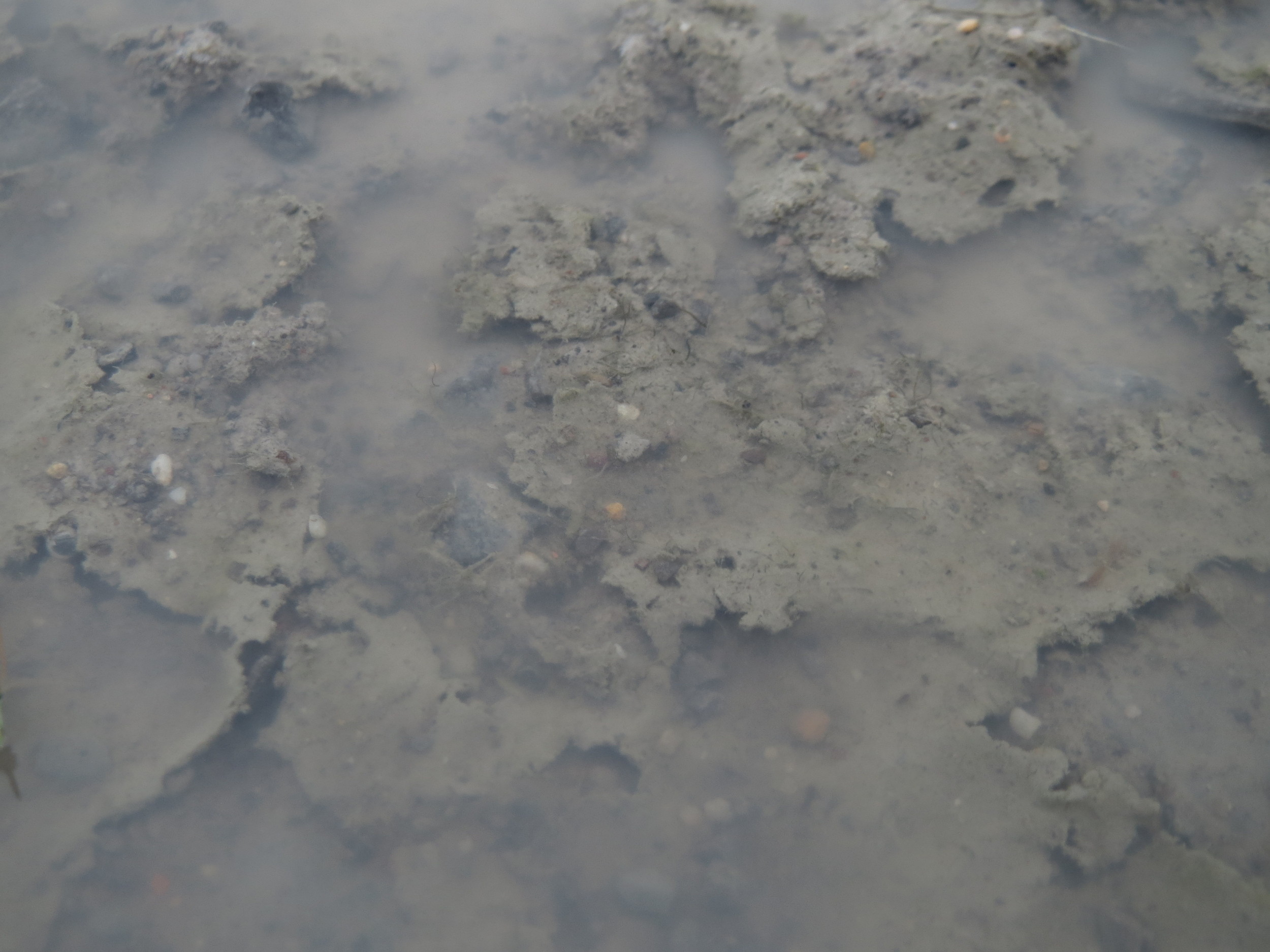
Aquatic Nostoc

=== Interactions with other organisms ===
Depending on the species, Nostoc may either be free-living in their environment, or they may form relationships with the other organisms in their environment, such as plants, fungi, or other bacteria. Because Nostoc is able to form colonies on the surface of bare minerals, it is able to provide a more stable environment for higher vegetation in its environment. Some species of Nostoc also form relationships with plants that lack vascular tissue such as Bryophytes because of their ability to fix nitrogen. Nostoc has also been found to form symbiotic associations and other relationships with other bacteria in their environment. Some species of Nostoc that form colonies in freshwater environments provide a habitat to other freshwater bacteria. Additionally, some species like N. commune and N. flageliforme form relationships with heterotrophic bacteria and actinobacteria present in their environments, likely due to the fact that they are a potential significant player in nitrogen cycling in aquatic ecosystems.

== Usage ==
=== Biotechnological usage ===
Nostoc has been documented to produce many compounds of interest, including those that are antiviral, antitumor, antifungal, and antibacterial.

In addition to the suggested pharmaceutical usage, Nostoc has also been a suggested biofertilizer, and source of fatty acids for biofuel production.

=== Environmental usage ===
Nostoc has the unique ability to survive and colonize new and bare mineral surfaces by moss and other higher plants, which then allows for more organic soil and stable vegetation. It has been suggested that Nostoc be used in environments of retreating glaciers in order to establish new and more stable presences of vegetation on newly exposed mineral surfaces.

=== Historical and culinary usage ===
Nostoc has historically been utilized as a healthy food and traditional medicine, most notably in Asia Historically, the species N. flagelliforme and N. commune have been consumed in China, where it was used to survive famines and has been used as an ingredient in Chinese medicine since the Eastern Jin Dynasty. Additionally, Nostoc has had documented culinary usage in India, Indonesia, Peru, Bolivia, and Ecuador.

Nostoc is also highly nutritious, containing protein and vitamin C, as well as all essential amino acids. It has been suggested to be anti-inflammatory and an antioxidant as well. Because of this, Nostoc has also been considered to be a strong candidate for extraterrestrial agriculture.

== Human impact and management ==
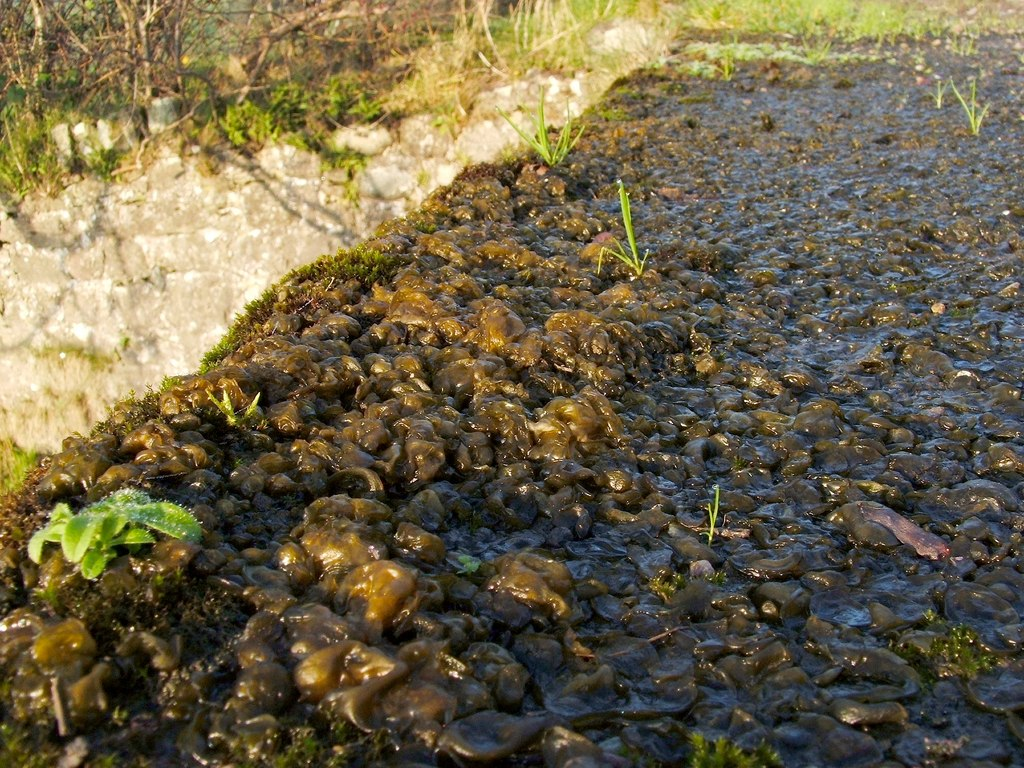
Nostoc commune overtaking a footbridge

Because of human foot traffic, and contaminated gardening tools and irrigation systems, Nostoc is commonly found outside of its natural habitat in plant nurseries and greenhouses. A number of different control methods can be effective in removing unwanted Nostoc from these environments, including implementing increased drainage in these facilities, physical removal of Nostoc, and flame weeders or solarization.

== Taxonomy ==
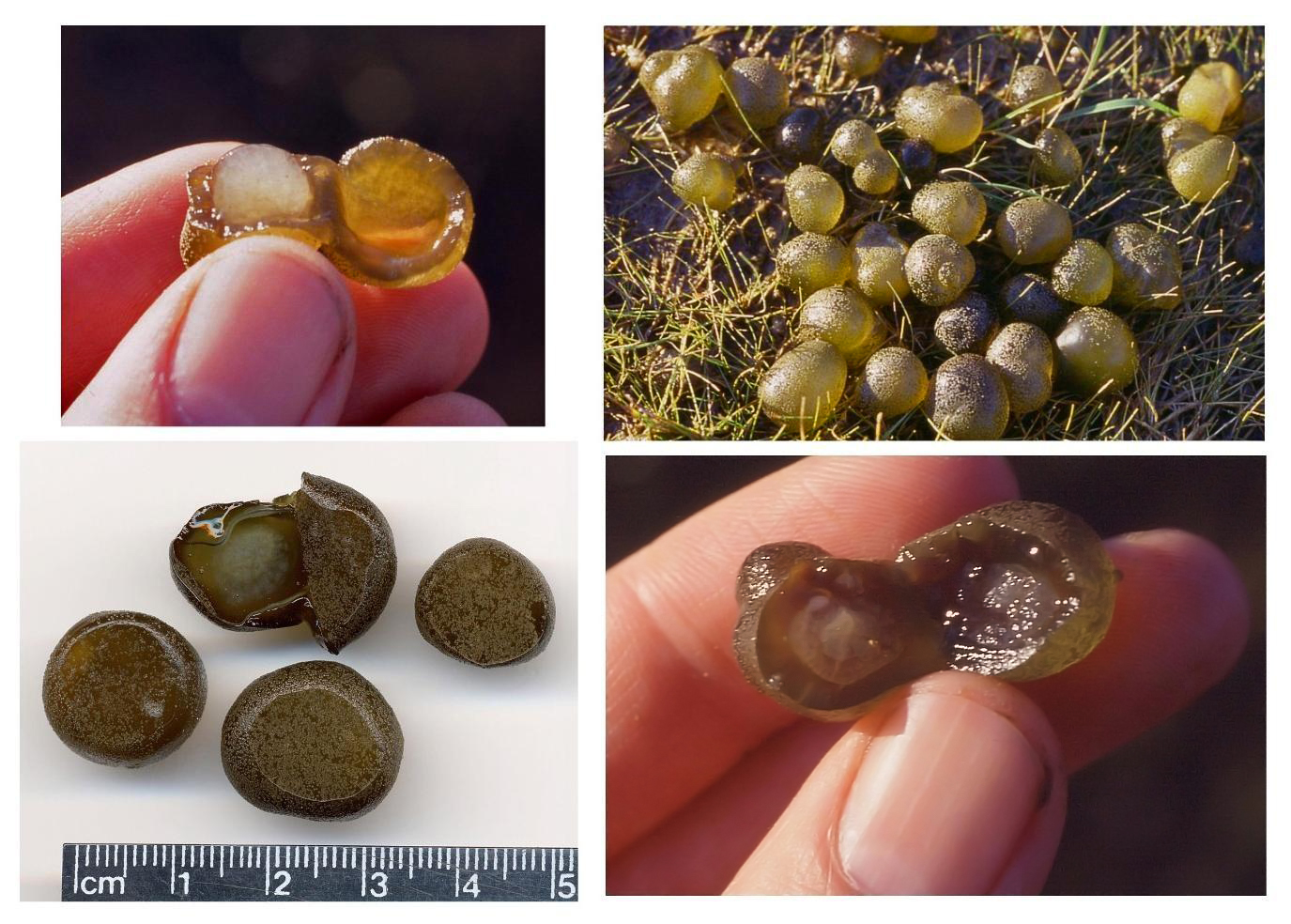
Nostoc pruniforme

Nostoc is a member of the family Nostocaceae of the order Nostocales. Species include (see collapsed list on the right for full listing) :

- Nostoc azollae
- Nostoc caeruleum Lyngbye ex Bornet et Flahault
- Nostoc carneum
- Nostoc comminutum
- Nostoc commune (Linnaeus) Vaucher ex Bornet et Flahault (Chinese: Koxianmi)
- Nostoc ellipsosporum
- Nostoc flagelliforme
- Nostoc linckia
- Nostoc longstaffi
- Nostoc microscopicum (Carmichael ex Harvey) Bornet et Flahault
- Nostoc muscorum
- Nostoc paludosum
- Nostoc pruniforme (Linnaeus) C. A. Agardh ex Bornet et Flahault
- Nostoc punctiforme
- Nostoc sphaericum
- Nostoc sphaeroides
- Nostoc spongiaeforme
- Nostoc thermotolerans
- Nostoc verrucosum Vaucher ex Bornet et Flahault
