= Heinrich Klebahn =

German mycologist and botanist (1859–1942)

Heinrich Klebahn (20 February 1859, Bremen – 5 October 1942, Hamburg) was a German mycologist and phytopathologist.

In 1884 he obtained his PhD from the University of Jena, afterwards working as a schoolteacher in Bremen (1885–1894) and Hamburg (1894-1899). From 1905 onward, he was associated with the botanical gardens at Hamburg. From 1921 to 1934 he was an honorary professor and lecturer of cryptogamy and soil biology at the Institut für Allgemeine Botanik in Hamburg.

== Honours ==
In 1895 Ernst Lemmermann named the algae genus Klebahniella in his honor. Then in 1906 he was commemorated with the mycological genus Klebahnia by Joseph Charles Arthur, which is a synonym of Uromyces (Link) Unger, 1833. In 1939, W. Kirschstein published Klebahnopycnis a genus of fungi, this is now classified as a synonym of Hoehneliella Bresadola & Saccardo, 1902. Lastly, in 2011, Inderbitzin and co-authors named the plant pathogenic fungus Verticillium klebahnii after him.

== Written works ==
- Die wirtwechselnden Rostpilze, 1904 – The heteroecious rusts.
- Krankheiten des Flieders, 1909 – Diseases of lilacs.
- Die Algen, Moose und Farnpflanzen, 1914
- Grundzüge der allgemeinen Phytopathologie. Berlin: Verlag von Gebrüder Borntraeger, 1912 – Outline of general phytopathology.
- Aufgaben und Ergebnisse biologischer Pilzforschung. Vorträge aus dem Gesamtgebiet der Botanik, Heft 1. Berlin: Verlag von Gebrüder Borntraeger, 1914 – Tasks and results involving biological fungi research.
- Beiträge zur Kenntnis der Fungi Imperfecti: III. Zur Kritik einiger Pestalozzia-Arten in Mycologisches Centralblatt 4:1 pp. 1–19 - Contributions towards understanding the fungi imperfecti, a critique of some species of Pestalozzia.
- Haupt- und Nebenfruchtformen der Askomyzeten: Erster Teil: Eigene Untersuchungen, 395 pp. - Primary and secondary fruiting body forms in the Ascomycetes.
