= Hydrocoryne (alga) =

Scientific classification
- Domain: Bacteria
- Phylum: Cyanobacteria
- Class: Cyanophyceae
- Order: Nostocales
- Family: Nostocaceae
- Genus: Hydrocoryne; H.Schwabe ex Bornet & Flahault, 1886

Genus of bacteria

Hydrocoryne is a genus of cyanobacteria belonging to the family Nostocaceae.

Species:

- Hydrocoryne spongiosa Schwabe ex Bornet & Flahault
