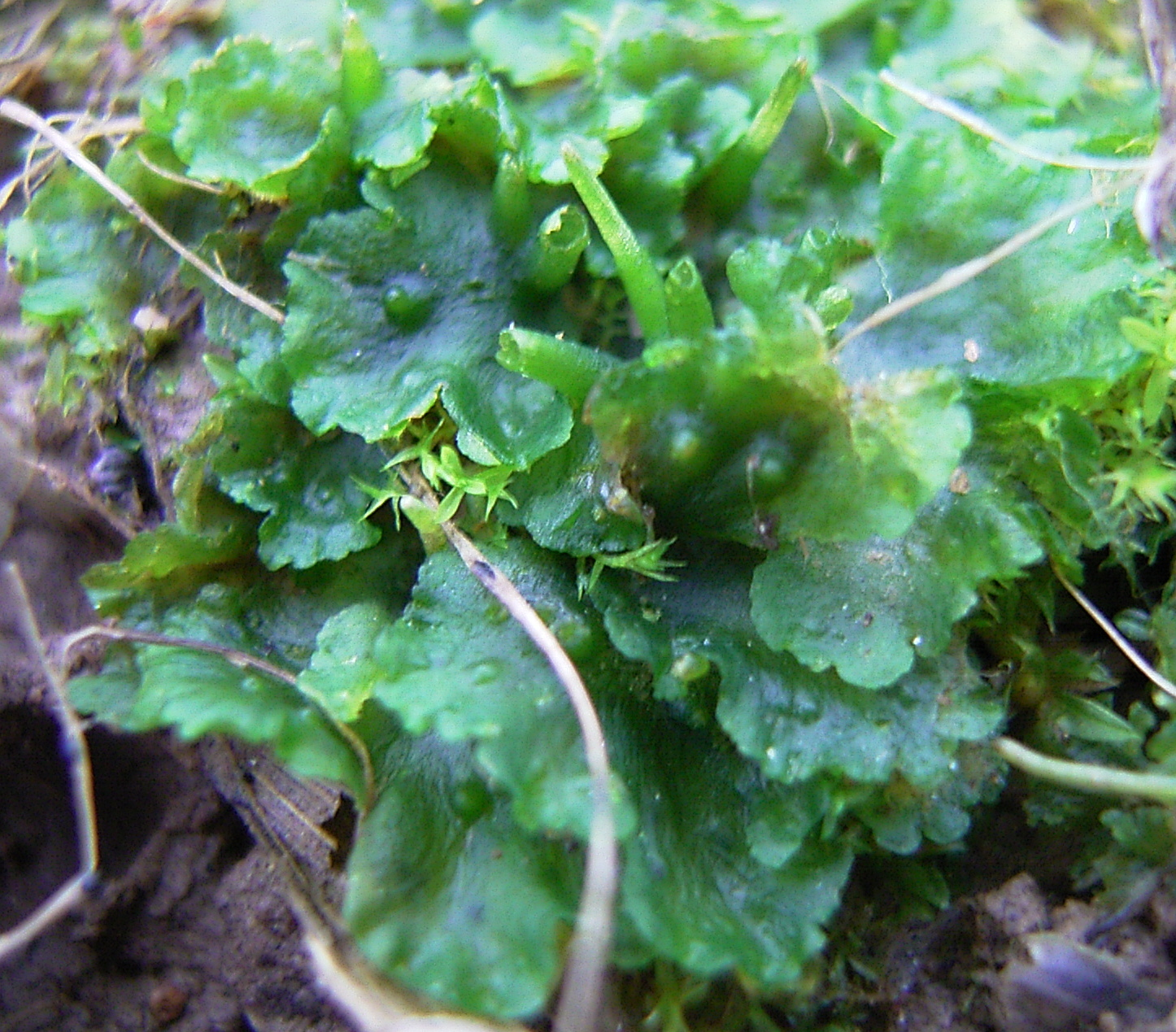

Scientific classification
- Kingdom: Plantae
- Clade: Embryophytes
- Division: Anthocerotophyta
- Class: Anthocerotopsida
- Order: Notothyladales
- Family: Notothyladaceae
- Genus: Phaeoceros
- Species: P. laevis

Binomial name
- Phaeoceros laevis (L.) Prosk.

Synonyms
- Anthoceros laevis L.

= Phaeoceros laevis =

Species of hornwort

Phaeoceros laevis, the smooth hornwort, is a species of hornwort of the genus Phaeoceros. It is commonly found in areas where moisture is plentiful, such as moist soils in fields, the banks of streams and rivers or inundated beneath the surface of the rivers. It grows to a maximum height of about 5 millimetres and the plants are monoecious; the sex organs are visible on the dorsal surface.

The thallus is nearly flat on the upper surface. It is of dark green and somewhat lustrous color, devoid of intercellular spaces. Its capsule is commonly 6 inches (150 mm) to 18 inches (460 mm) in length. The base is surrounded by a cylindrical sheath that often flares at the mouth. Spores are yellow with a granular-papillose surface. The elaters are yellowish, often branches, and varying in size and form. The slender green capsules, when produced in large numbers, resemble grass tufts. Mature spores are necessary for species determination.

The cytology of P. laevis has been subject to considerable study. In 1909, Lotsy reported that the plant contained one chloroplast in each cell of the gametophyte and two in each cell of the sporophyte. The sporophyte is likened to an elongated spindle. Research conducted by Lorbeer in 1924 revealed that two plastids are present in a cell when it is undergoing cell division, of which according to McAllister may vary in size. The centrosomes of the species, much like Marchantia polymorpha, are composed of two centrioles apposed end-to end, which are connected by a continuation of their cartwheel structures.

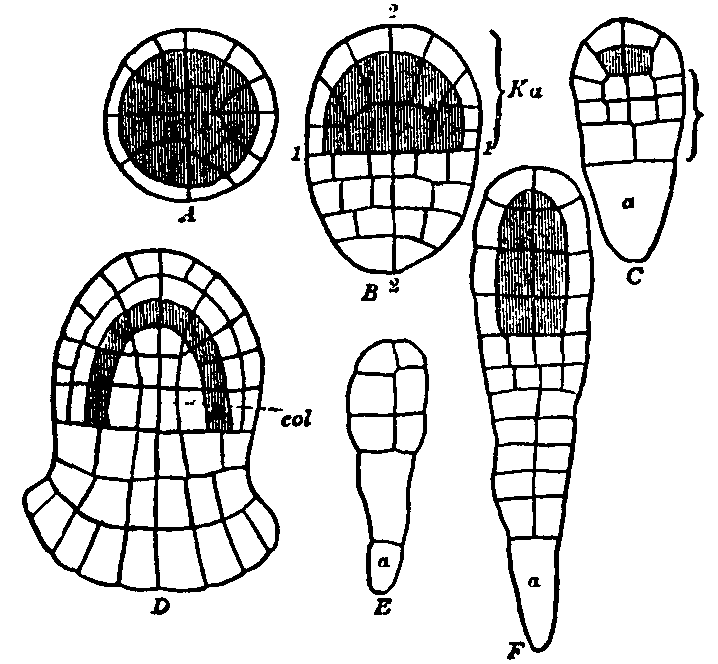
Phaeoceros laevis (D). Illustration from the 1911 Encyclopædia Britannica
