= Witches' butter =

Witches' butter (or Witch's butter) may refer to:

- Exidia nigricans, a black, gelatinous fungus
- Exidia glandulosa, a black, gelatinous fungus
- Fuligo septica, a yellow, gelatinous slime mold
- Tremella mesenterica, a yellow, gelatinous fungus
- Dacrymyces, a jelly fungus often confused with Tremella
- Nostoc, a genus of gelatinous cyanobacteria
