= Relevé =

Relevé can refer to:

- Relevé (dance), rising onto or standing on the toes or balls of one or both feet
- Relevé (population ecology), a plot that encloses the minimal area under a species-area curve
- Relevé (phytosociology), a plot or table of phytosociological data
- Relevé (French cuisine), an obsolete term for a type of entrée

== Other ==
- Relevés, an episode of the series Hannibal
- Relève (Vichy regime), a work program in World War II France
