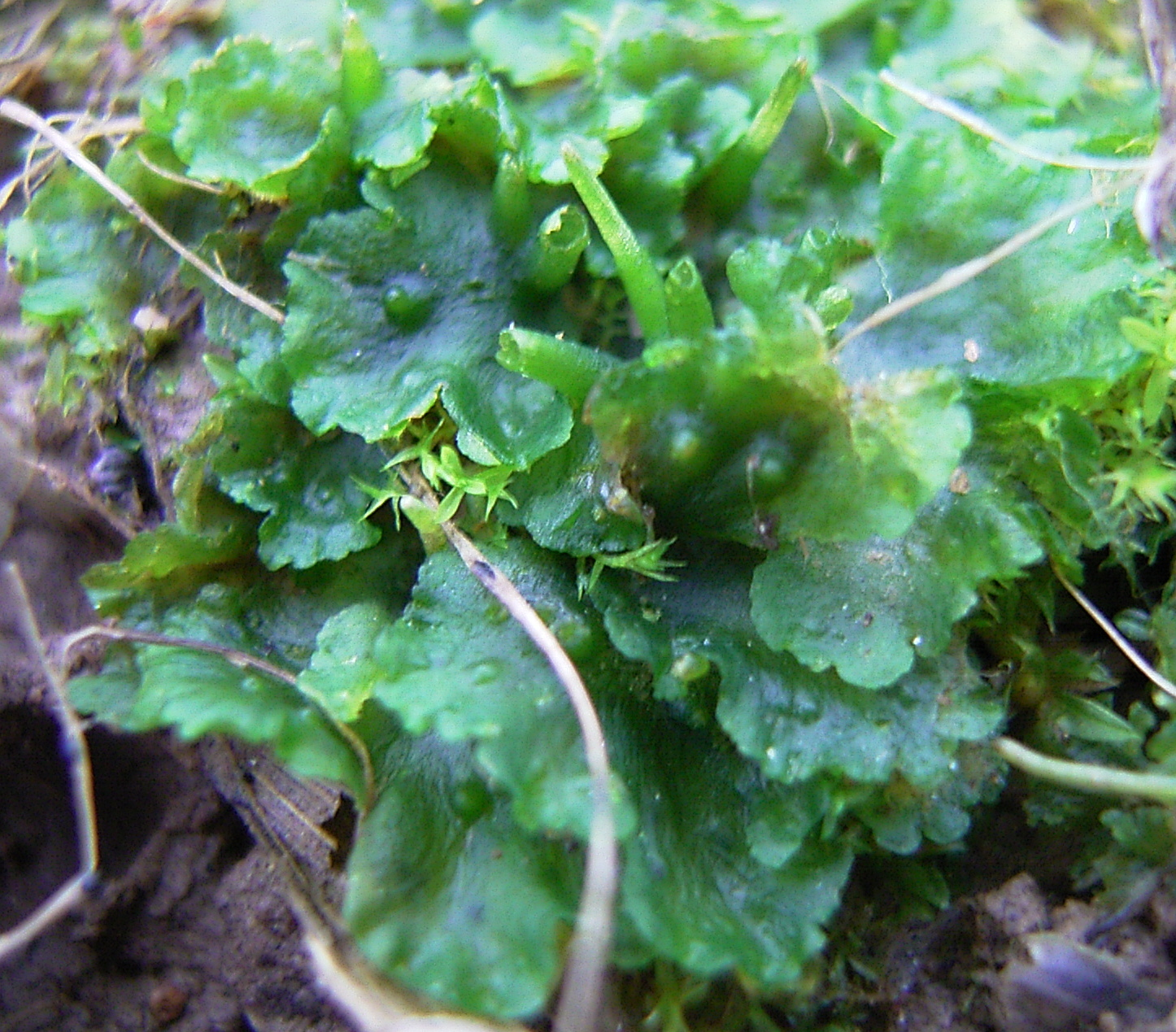
- Phaeoceros laevis (L.) Prosk.

Scientific classification
- Kingdom: Plantae
- Division: Anthocerotophyta
- Class: Anthocerotopsida
- Order: Notothyladales
- Family: Notothyladaceae
- Genus: Phaeoceros; Prosk.

Species
- Phaeoceros bulbiculosus (Brot.) Prosk. Phaeoceros dichotomus Phaeoceros evanidus Phaeoceros hallii (Austin) Prosk. Phaeoceros laevis (L.) Prosk. Phaeoceros laevis subsp. carolinianus (Michx.) Prosk. Phaeoceros mohrii (Austin) Hässel; Phaeoceros novazealandicus Phaeoceros pearsonii (M. Howe) Prosk. Phaeoceros striatisporus J. Haseg. Phaeoceros tjipanasanus

= Phaeoceros =

Genus of hornworts

Phaeoceros is a genus of hornworts in the family Notothyladaceae. The genus is global in its distribution. Its name means 'yellow horn', and refers to the characteristic yellow spores that the plants produce in the horn-shaped sporophyte. The genus Phaeoceros was first recognized in 1951 by Johannes Max Proskauer. The type species is Phaeoceros laevis. The genus is distinguished by having yellow spores, different chloroplast structure, relatively less frilliness of the thallus when compared to Anthoceros, and a relative lack of internal cavities in Phaeoceros.

The yellow color of the spores is the easiest way to distinguish Phaeoceros from the common genus Anthoceros, which produces spores that are dark brown to black. Phaeoceros is often confused with Anthoceros, and dried plants are particularly difficult to distinguish in, but the two genera can always be recognized, when fertile and mature, by the spores. When sterile, the distinguishing characteristic is the absence of lacunae (gaps within the tissue) within the thallus, which in Anthoceros are large and numerous.
