= Johannes Max Proskauer =

Johannes Max Proskauer (December 5, 1923 – December 20, 1970) was born in Göttingen, Germany. He travelled to England via a Kindertransport. His mother died in 1943 and his father was murdered in Auschwitz.

He attended the University of London, which awarded him a B.Sc. in 1944, a Ph.D. in 1947, and a D.Sc. in 1964, all in the field of botany.

In 1948, Proskauer moved to Berkeley, California, where he became an instructor in botany at the University of California, Berkeley. He was awarded a Guggenheim Fellowship in 1954. He became a United States citizen in 1957.

Professor Proskauer's thesis research was concerned with the biology and morphology of the British species of the hornwort Anthoceros. Much of his life's work focussed on this group, and in 1951, he recognized and defined the genus Phaeoceros for the first time. He continued to work at Berkeley on the morphology and cytology on the hornworts and also the liverworts.

He died in 1970, leaving a legacy of careful and meticulous study.

== Works ==
- (1948) Studies on the morphology of Anthoceros. I. Annals of Bot., Ser. 2, 12: 237–265.
- (1948) Studies on the morphology of Anthoceros. II. Annals of Bot., Ser. 2, 12: 427–439.
- (1951) Studies on Anthocerotales. III. Bull. Torrey Bot. Club 78: 331–349.
- (1951) Studies on Anthocerotales. IV. Bull. Torrey Bot. Club 80: 65–75.
- (1954) A study of the Phaeoceros laevis complex and the European Anthocerotae. Rapp. et Comm. VIII Cong. Int. Bot., Paris xiv-xvi: 68–69.
- (1958) Studies on Anthocerotales. V. Phytomorphology 7: 113–135.
- (1960) Studies on Anthocerotales. VI. Phytomorphology 10: 1–19.
- (1962) On Carrpos. I. Phytomorphology 11: 359–378.
- (1962) On Takakia, especially its mucilage hairs. J. Hattori Bot. Lab 25: 217–223.
- (1965) On the liverwort Phyllothallia. Phytomorphology 15: 375–379.
- (1968) Studies on Anthocerotales. VII. Phytomorphology 17: 61–70.
- (1969) Studies on Anthocerotales. VIII. Phytomorphology 19: 52–66.
