= Charles Flahault =

French botanist (1852–1935)

Charles Henri Marie Flahault (3 October 1852 – 3 February 1935) was a French botanist, among the early pioneers of phytogeography, phytosociology, and forest ecology. The word relevé for a plant community sample is his invention.

== Early life and education ==
Flahault was born in Bailleul, Nord, and received his Baccalauréat de Lettres at Douai in 1872, after which he became a gardener at the Jardin des Plantes de Paris. He was noticed by Joseph Decaisne (1807–1882), who gave him private lessons, after which he entered the Sorbonne in 1874 to study in the laboratory of Philippe Van Tieghem (1839–1914), obtaining his doctoral degree in biology in 1878. He continued his studies at Uppsala University in 1879 together with Gaston Bonnier.

== Career ==
In 1881 joined the University of Montpellier where in 1883 he became professor of botany, and in 1890 he founded the Institut de Botanique. The Swiss botanist Josias Braun-Blanquet was one of his students In 1888 Flahault was elected member of the Royal Physiographic Society in Lund, 1905 to the Royal Society of Sciences in Uppsala (1905), and in 1907 he was awarded an honorary doctor at Uppsala University. He resided in Montpellier until his death, and is buried in that city's Cimetière Saint Lazare.

== Legacy ==
Several plant species have been named to his honour.

== Work ==
- Recherches sur l’accroissement terminal de la racine chez les phanérogames (thèse de doctorat), G. Masson, Paris, 1878 (198 pp., 8 pl.)
- Observations sur les modifications des végétaux suivant les conditions physiques du milieu, An. Sc. Nat. Bot. 6, VII, p. 93-125, 1878 (avec Gaston Bonnier).
- Nouvelles observations sur les modifications des végétaux suivant les conditions physiques du milieu, An. Sc. Nat. Bot. 6, IX, p. 159-207, (1878).
- Phénomènes périodiques de la végétation d’après les travaux météorologiques scandinaves, 1878
- Nouvelles observations sur les modifications des végétaux suivant les conditions physiques du milieu, B.S.B.F., XXXVI, p. 346-350, (1879).
- Distribution des végétaux dans les régions moyennesde la presqu’île scandinave, 1879 (avec Gaston Bonnier)
- Révision des Nostocacées Hétérocystées contenues dans les principaux herbiers de France, 1886-1888 (avec Bornet) (réimprimé en 1959)
- Sur quelques plantes vivant dans le test calcaire des Mollusques, B.S.B.F., 36, 1889.
- La répartition géographique des végétaux dans un coin du Languedoc (département de l’Hérault), Montpellier, 1893
- Projet de carte botanique, forestière et agricole de la France, 1894
- Sur la flore de la Camargue et des alluvions du Rhône, B.S.B.F., 41, 1894 (avec P. Combres).
- Au sujet de la carte botanique, forestière et agricole de la France, et des moyens de l’exécuter, 1896
- La flore de la vallée de Barcelonnette, 1897
- La distribution géographique des végétaux dans la région méditerranéenne française, Paris, 1897 (publié par Gaussen en 1937)
- Essai d’une carte botanique et forestière de la France, 1897
- La flore et la végétation de la France, Klincksieck, 1901
- La flore et la végétation de la France, introduction à la Flore de France de H. Coste, Paris, 1901
- Les limites supérieures de la végétation forestière et les prairies pseudo-alpines en France, R.E.F., 1901
- Premier essai de nomenclature phytogéographique, Bulletin de la Société languedocienne de géographie, Montpellier, 1901
- La nomenclature en géographie botanique, Annales de Géographie, X, 1901
- La paléobotanique dans ses rapports avecla végétation actuelle, Klincksieck, Paris, 1903
- Les hauts sommets et la vie végétale, La Montagne, Club alpin français, 1904
- Rapport au sujet des jardins botaniques de l’Aigoual, Montpellier, 1904
- Nouvelle flore coloriée de poche des Alpes et des Pyrénées, Série 1, Librairie des Sciences naturelles Paul Klincksieck, 1906 (volume II de la collection)
- Les jardins alpins, A.G., 1906
- Préface de l'Hortus Vilmorianus, 1906
- Introduction au Catalogue des plantes vasculaires dans le département du Var par Albert et Jahandiez, 1908.
- Nouvelle flore coloriée de poche des Alpes et des Pyrénées, Série 2, Librairie des Sciences naturelles Paul Klincksieck, 1908.
- Rapport sur la nomenclature phytogéographique (avec Carl Joseph Schröter (1855–1939)), Actes du II^{e} Congrès international de botanique, Wildemann, Bruxelles, 1910
- Nouvelle flore coloriée de poche des Alpes et des Pyrénées, Série 3, Librairie des Sciences naturelles Paul Klincksieck, 1912.
- Notice sur les travaux scientifiques, Firmin et Montane, Montpellier, 1917
- Les Causses du Midi de la France, Bulletin de la Société languedocienne de Géographie, III-3, IV, V-1, 1932-1934.
- La distribution géographique des végétaux dans la région méditerranéenne française, Encyclopédie biologique Lechevalier, 1937.
