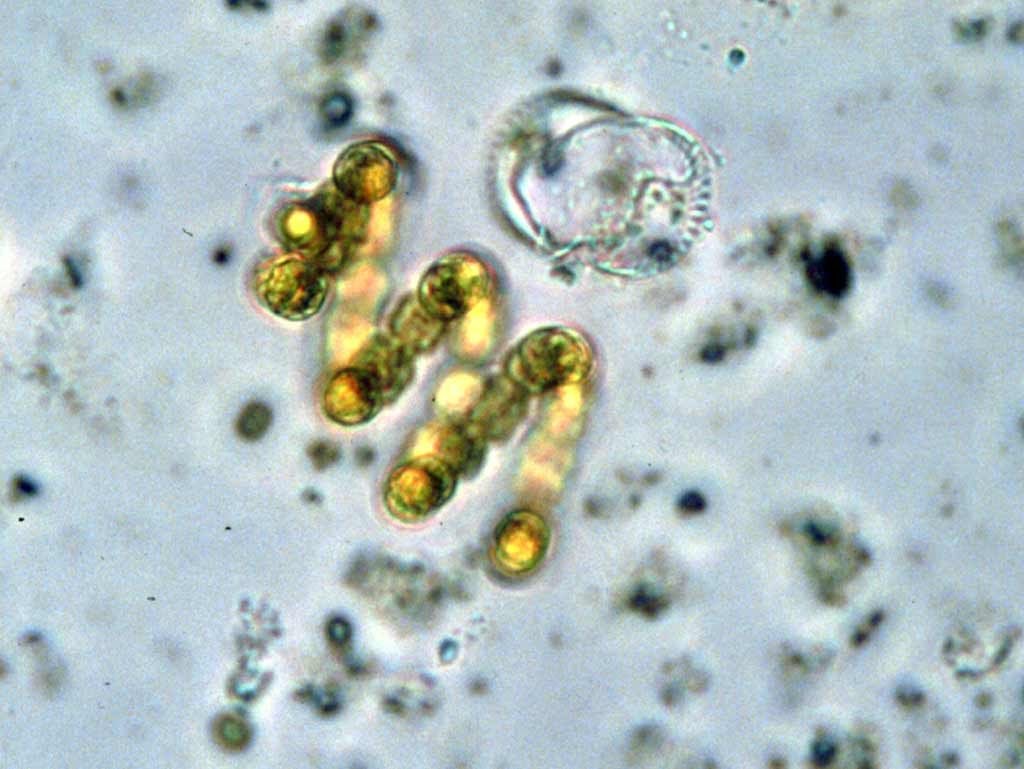
- Anabaena spiroides

Scientific classification
- Domain: Bacteria
- Kingdom: Bacillati
- Phylum: Cyanobacteriota
- Class: Cyanophyceae
- Order: Nostocales
- Family: Nostocaceae; C. A. Agardh ex Kirchner

Genera
- Amorphonostoc Elenkin 1937; Anabaena Bory ex Bornet & Flahault 1886; Camptylonemopsis Desikachary 1948; Coleospermopsis Hauer et al. 2015 provis.; Cronbergia Komárek et al. 2010; Cyanocohniella Kaštovský et al. 2014; Cylindrospermum Kützing ex Bornet & Flahault 1888; Desmonostoc Hrouzek & Ventura 2013; Goleter Miscoe et al. 2015; Hydrocoryne Schwabe ex Bornet & Flahault 1888; Isocystis Borzě ex Bornet & Flahault 1888; Macrospermum Komárek 2008; Mojavia Řeháková & Johansen 2007; Nostoc Vaucher ex Bornet & Flahault 1888; Richelia J. Schmidt in Ostenfeld & J. Schmidt 1901; Spelaea Miscoe et al. 2013 provis.; Tolypothrichopsis Hauer et al. 2015 provis.; Trichormus (Ralfs ex Bornet & Flahault) Komárek & Anagnostidis 1989; †Veteronostocale Schopf and Blacic, 1971; Wollea Bornet & Flahault 1888

= Nostocaceae =

Nostocaceae Temporal range: Calymmian - Present, 1590–0 Ma

Family of bacteria

The Nostocaceae are a family of cyanobacteria that forms filament-shaped colonies enclosed in mucus or a gelatinous sheath. Some genera in this family are found primarily in fresh water (such as Nostoc), while others are found primarily in salt water (such as Nodularia). Other genera (e.g. Anabaena) may be found in both fresh and salt water. Most benthic algae of the order Nostocales belong to this family.

Like other cyanobacteria, these bacteria sometimes contain photosynthetic pigments in their cytoplasm to perform photosynthesis. The particular pigments they contain gives the cells a bluish-green color.

Species of the Nostocaceae are particularly known for their nitrogen-fixing abilities, and they form symbiotic relationships with certain plants, such as the mosquito fern, cycads, and hornworts. The cyanobacteria provide nitrogen to their hosts. Certain species of Anabaena have been used on rice paddy fields. Mosquito ferns carrying the cyanobacteria grow on the water in the fields during the growing season. They and the nitrogen they contain are then plowed into the soil following the harvest, which has proved to be an effective natural fertilizer.

The family Nostocaceae belongs to the order Nostocales. Members of the family can be distinguished from those in other families by their unbranched filaments of cells arranged end-to-end, and development of heterocysts among the cells of the filaments.
