= Cyanophyceae =

Scientific classification
- Domain: Bacteria
- Kingdom: Bacillati
- Phylum: Cyanobacteriota
- Class: Cyanophyceae

Class of bacteria

Cyanophyceae is a class of cyanobacteria.

== Orders ==
- Chroococcales
- Nostocales
- Synechococcales
- Pleurocapsales
- Spirulinales
- Oscillatoriales
