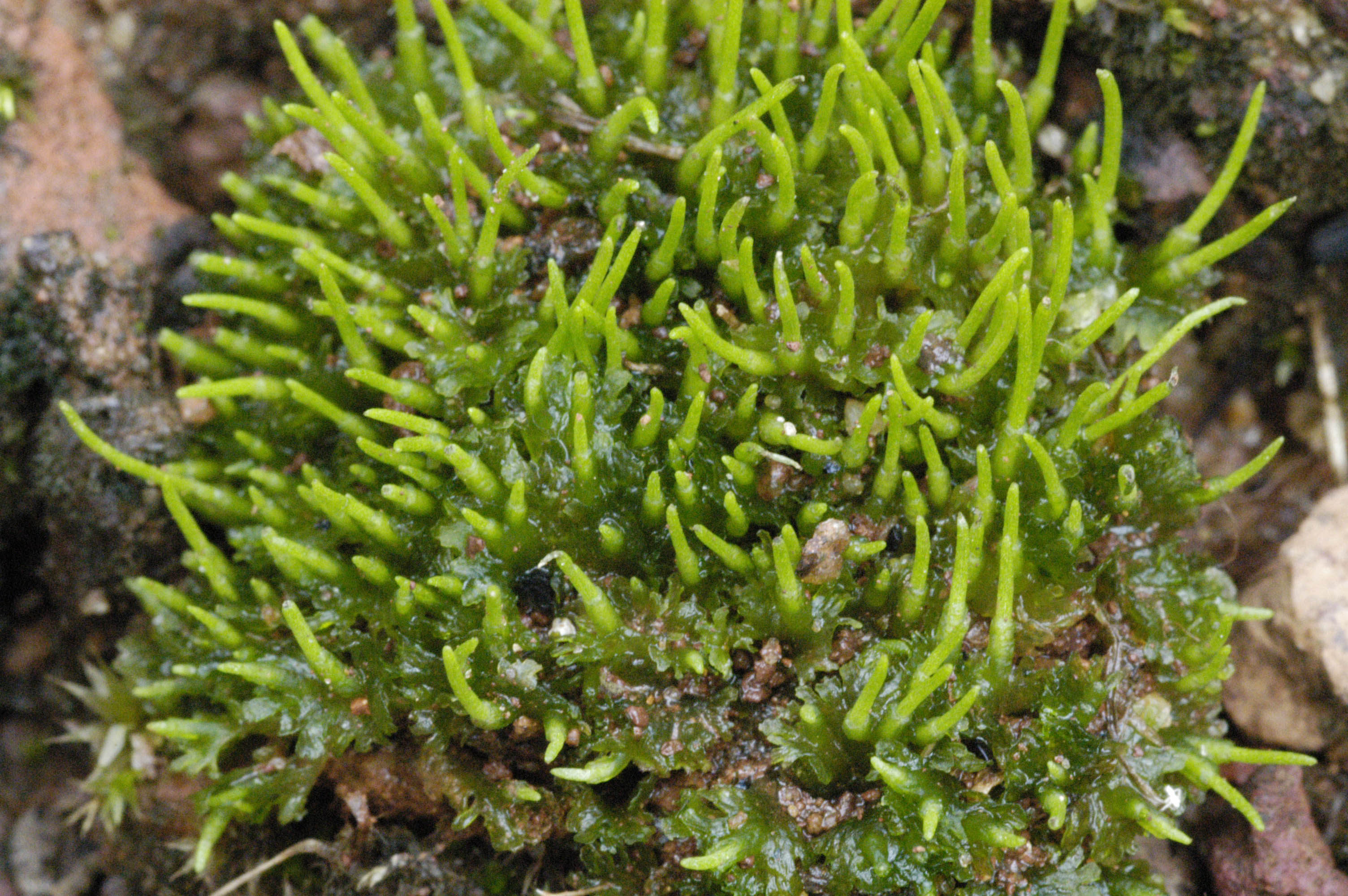

Scientific classification
- Kingdom: Plantae
- Division: Anthocerotophyta
- Class: Anthocerotopsida
- Order: Anthocerotales
- Family: Anthocerotaceae
- Genus: Anthoceros
- Species: A. angustus

Binomial name
- Anthoceros angustus Steph.

= Anthoceros angustus =

Species of hornwort

Anthoceros angustus is a species of hornwort that belongs to the family Anthocerotaceae.

== Genome ==
The genome and mitochondrial genome of Anthoceros angustus was sequenced making it the third hornwort species to have its mitochondrial genome completely sequenced. In these studies there were no evidence of Whole Genome Duplications (WGDs) and a large number of pentatricopeptide repeats. It bears the signatures of horizontally transferred genes from species of bacteria and fungi, in particular of genes operating in stress-response and metabolic pathways. The sequencing of genomes from land pioneering plants, specifically Bryophytes, is useful for the study early land plant evolution their adaptation to a terrestrial environment.

There appears to be 7,644 gene families that are shared with other plant species and 497 gene families that appear to be unique to Anthoceros angustus. It has lost many gene families (around 2,145) and comparatively only modest gains (around 497). The genome of its mitochondria comprises 242,410 base pairs and encodes 21 protein coding genes, three rRNA genes and 20 tRNA genes, with 38 introns disrupting 16 protein-coding genes, etc. It is the most intron-rich plant determined to date.

=== Transcription factors ===
In all, the genome of Anthoceros angustus comprises 333 putative genes for transcription factors (TF) that cover 61 protein families. This is very similar to other bryophyte genomes. This high diversity in transcription factors reflects the diversification of green plants during the transition to land. This is true for other gene families, like for example the Cupin gene family comprising more bicupin genes than any other plant species.
