= Anthoceros alpinus =

Scientific classification
- Kingdom: Plantae
- Division: Anthocerotophyta
- Class: Anthocerotopsida
- Order: Anthocerotales
- Family: Anthocerotaceae
- Genus: Anthoceros
- Species: A. alpinus

Binomial name
- Anthoceros alpinus Steph.

Rare species of hornwort

Anthoceros alpinus is a species of hornwort belonging to the family Anthocerotoceae. It is native to the Garhwal Himalayas located in Uttarakhand, India. It grows at elevations of 2134 meters.

It is a rare species to encounter due to its restricted distribution and location. Thus knowledge of this species was based solely on the type specimen for more than a century. However specimens such as the one collected in 1879 by Duthie Levier in the Mussoorie region provided additional specimens of this species allowing for a better understanding of the morphology of this species.
