= Anthoceros adscendens =

Scientific classification
- Kingdom: Plantae
- Division: Anthocerotophyta
- Class: Anthocerotopsida
- Order: Anthocerotales
- Family: Anthocerotaceae
- Genus: Anthoceros
- Species: A. adscendens

Binomial name
- Anthoceros adscendens Lehm. & Lindenb

Species of hornwort

Anthoceros adscendens is a species of hornwort belonging to the family Anthocerotaceae. It is only native to Florida, United States.
