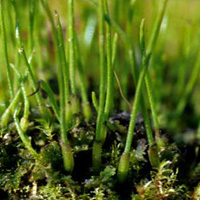

Scientific classification
- Kingdom: Plantae
- Division: Anthocerotophyta
- Class: Anthocerotopsida
- Order: Anthocerotales
- Family: Anthocerotaceae
- Genus: Anthoceros
- Species: A. punctatus

Binomial name
- Anthoceros punctatus L.

= Anthoceros punctatus =

Species of hornwort

Anthoceros punctatus is a species of hornwort that belongs to the family Anthocerotaceae. It is the type species of its genus.
