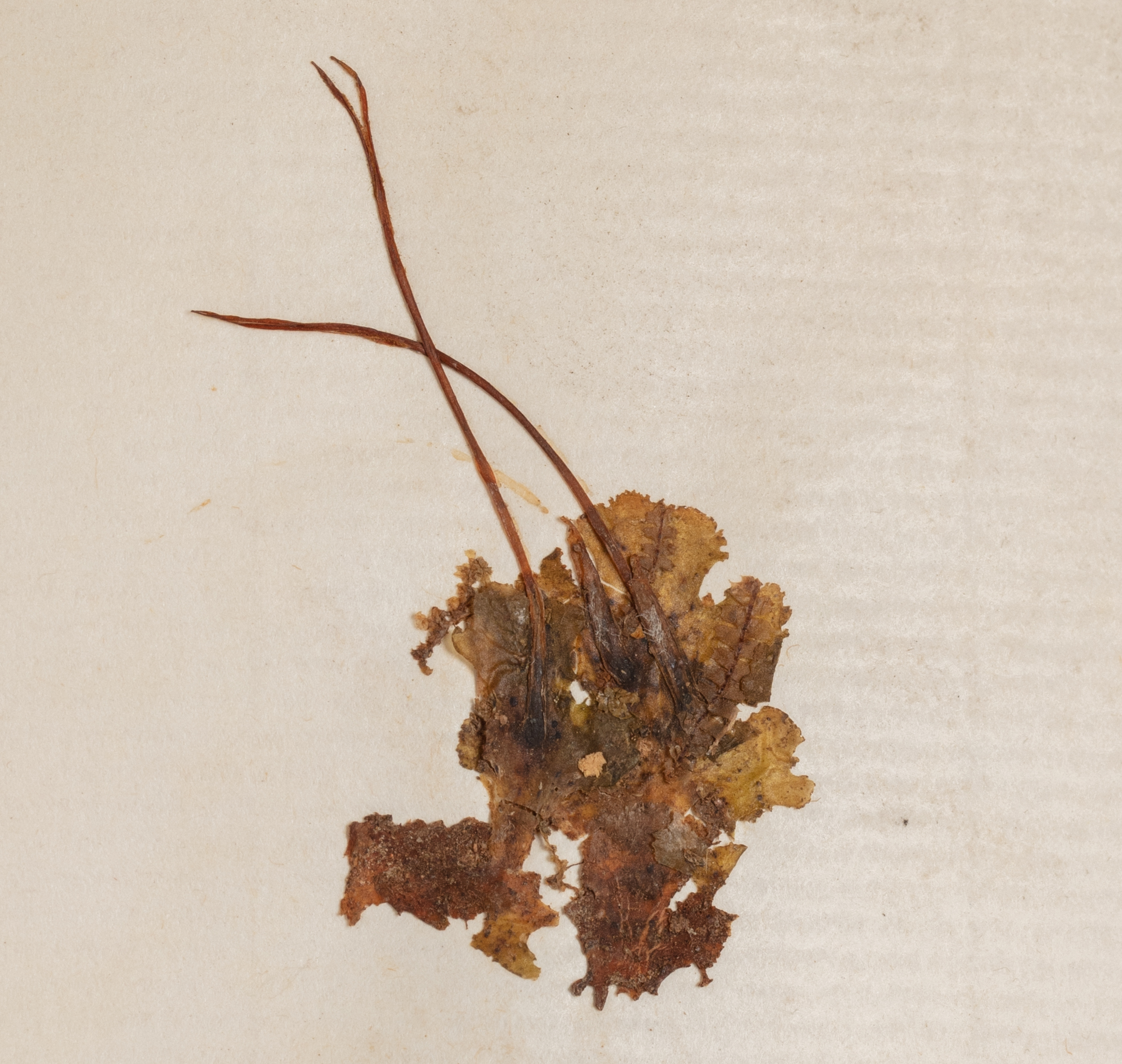
- Unidentified Megaceros specimen

Scientific classification
- Kingdom: Plantae
- Division: Anthocerotophyta
- Class: Anthocerotopsida
- Order: Dendrocerotales
- Family: Dendrocerotaceae
- Genus: Megaceros; Campbell

Species
- Megaceros aenigmaticus Megaceros alatifrons Steph. Megaceros denticulatus Megaceros flagellaris (Mitt.) Steph. Megaceros gracilis Megaceros guatemalensis Steph. Megaceros novae-zelandiae Steph. Megaceros pallens (Steph.) Steph. Megaceros pellucidus (Colenso) E.A. Hodgs. Megaceros salakensis D. Campb. Megaceros tjibodensis D. Campb.

= Megaceros =

Genus of hornworts

Megaceros is a genus of hornworts in the family Dendrocerotaceae. The genus is found in the Old World tropics of east Asia and Australia. Its name means 'big horn', and refers both to the exceptionally large size of the gametophyte thallus and to the large, horn-shaped sporophyte that the plants produce. Many species have a branching thallus that is more than two centimeters wide. The gametophytes are monoicous.

The genus Megaceros is unusual among hornworts in that the sporophyte does not have stomata, and the spores are green because they contain chloroplasts, as does the related genus Dendroceros. They can have as many as 14 chloroplasts per cell, the highest known number in hornworts. The elaters are helical.

The genus Megaceros was first recognized in 1907 by D. Campbell. More recently, the genera Nothoceros and Phaeomegaceros have been split off from this genus. The former genus includes all New World species previously included in Megaceros.
