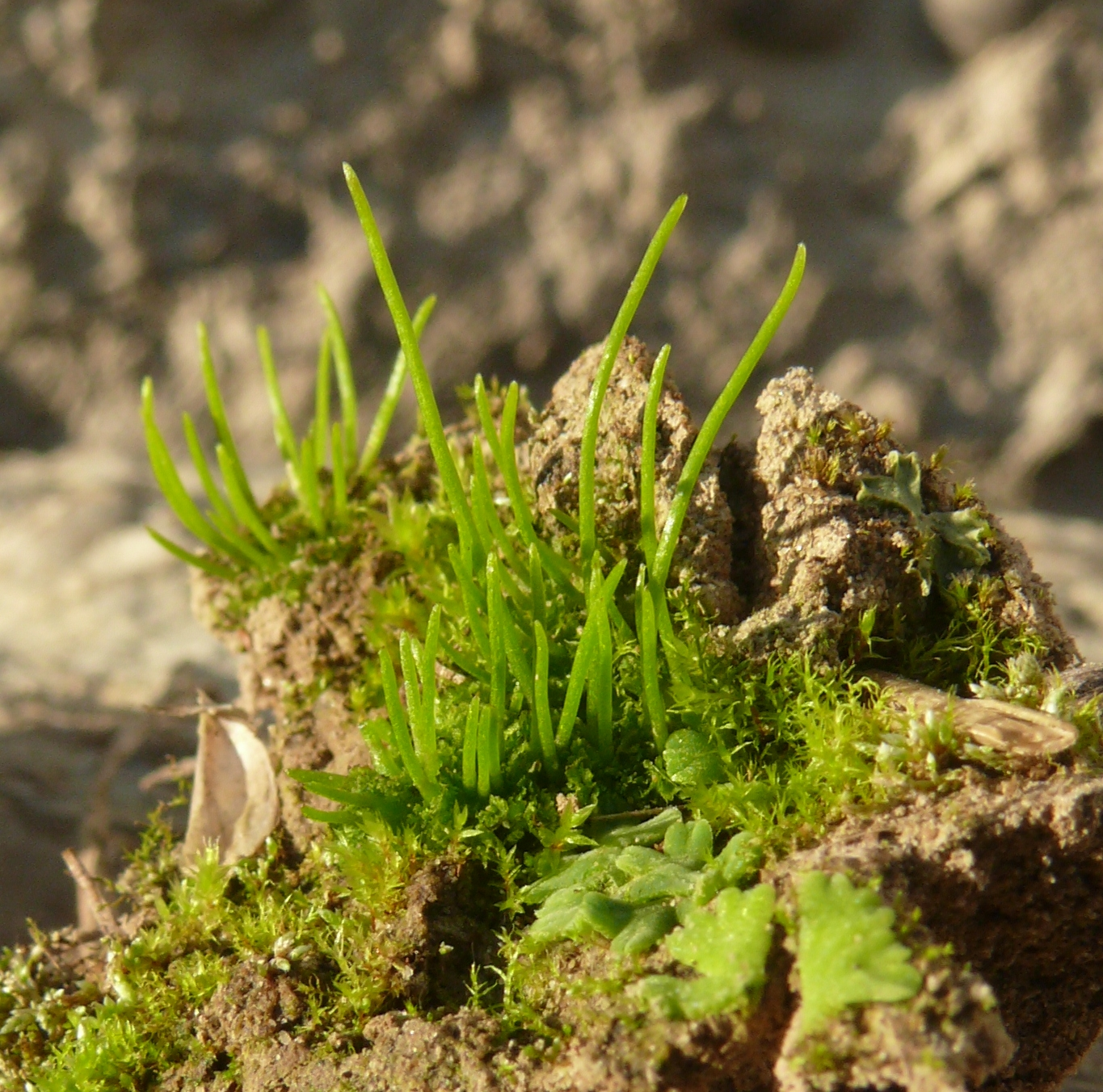
- Anthoceros agrestis in Schwäbisch-Fränkische Waldberge, Germany

Conservation status
- Apparently Secure (NatureServe)

Scientific classification
- Kingdom: Plantae
- Clade: Embryophytes
- Division: Anthocerotophyta
- Class: Anthocerotopsida
- Order: Anthocerotales
- Family: Anthocerotaceae
- Genus: Anthoceros
- Species: A. agrestis

Binomial name
- Anthoceros agrestis Paton

Synonyms
- Anthoceros multifidus auct. non. L.; Anthoceros nagasakiensis Steph.; Anthoceros punctatus auct. non L.; Anthoceros punctatus L. var. cavernosus (Nees) Gottsche Lindenb. & Nees; Aspiromitus agrestis (Paton) Schljakov; Aspiromitus cavernosus (Nees) Schljakov; Aspiromitus punctatus (L.) Schljakov var. agrestis (Paton) R.M. Schust.; A. crispulus non (Mont.) Douin; Anthoceros constans Lindb.; Anthoceros husnotii Steph.; Anthoceros longicapsulus Steph.; Anthoceros multilobulus Lindb.; Anthoceros punctatus var. cavernosus (Nees) Gottsche Lindenb. & Nees; Aspiromitus punctatus agrestis agrestis (Paton) R. M. Schust.

= Anthoceros agrestis =

Species of hornwort

Anthoceros agrestis, commonly called field hornwort, is a bryophyte of the family Anthocerotaceae. A. agrestis is considered the model species for hornwort biology and is used to study some of the unique traits that hornworts possess, such as their symbiotic relationship with nostoc and their use of pyrenoids to enhance photosynthesis.

== Description ==
Anthoceros agrestis grows as a thin, dark green, rosette-like thallus up to 1.5 cm (0.6 in) in diameter, superficially resembling a leafless liverwort. The surface is punctured with hollows containing the male organs. The spore-producing bodies lack a stalk or capsule but produce erect, cylindrical structures that turn black as they mature. They then split open to reveal the spore-bearing central spindle and release the black spores.

== Distribution and habitat ==
This hornwort has a circum-boreal distribution across temperate Europe and North America. It is a lowland species found in moist soil in arable fields and ditches. It is listed as vulnerable in the Irish Red Data Book as it is known from fewer than five locations in the country. It occurs at a single location in Northern Ireland, in County Down, and because of its rarity there, it is listed as a Northern Ireland Priority Species.

== Chemistry ==
This species of Anthoceros is known for having enzymes like cinnamic acid 4-hydroxylase (EC 1.14.13.11), a cytochrome P450-dependent hydroxylase. It is one of the first known plant cytochrome P450 monooxygenases and also one of the best-characterized cytochrome P450 hydroxylases from higher plants.

Production of rosmarinic acid and a rosmarinic acid 3'-O-beta-D-glucoside in suspension cultures of this hornwort was also discovered in 2005.

Anthocerodiazonin, an alkaloid, was isolated from in vitro cultures of the species. Also, six glutamic acid amides, N-(4-hydroxybenzoyl)-glutamic acid, N-(3,4-dihydroxybenzoyl)-glutamic acid, N-(4-hydroxy-3-methoxybenzoyl)-glutamic acid, (E)-N-(isoferuloyl)-glutamic acid, (Z)-N-(isoferuloyl)-glutamic acid and (Z)-N-(p-coumaroyl)-glutamic acid were obtained as natural products.
