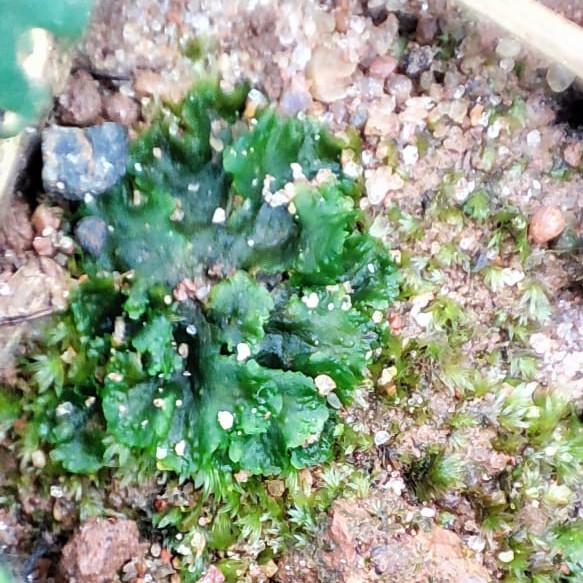

Conservation status
- Apparently Secure (NatureServe)

Scientific classification
- Kingdom: Plantae
- Division: Anthocerotophyta
- Class: Anthocerotopsida
- Order: Notothyladales
- Family: Notothyladaceae
- Genus: Notothylas
- Species: N. breutelii

Binomial name
- Notothylas breutelii (Gottsche) Gottsche

Synonyms
- Anthoceros breutelii, Gottsche; Notothylas amazonica, Spruce; Notothylas cubana, Steph.

= Notothylas breutelii =

Species of hornwort

Notothylas breutelii, or Breutel's notothylas, is a species of hornwort in the family Notothyladaceae. The species is found in Central and South America.
