= Notothylas =

Scientific classification
- Kingdom: Plantae
- Division: Anthocerotophyta
- Class: Anthocerotopsida
- Order: Notothyladales
- Family: Notothyladaceae
- Genus: Notothylas; Sull.

Species
- Notothylas anaporata Notothylas breutelii Notothylas chaudhurii Notothylas dissecta Notothylas flabellata Notothylas himalayensis Notothylas indica Notothylas japonicus Notothylas javanicus Notothylas khasiana Notothylas levieri Notothylas orbicularis Notothylas pandei Notothylas pfleidereri

Genus of hornworts

Notothylas is a genus of hornworts in the family Notothyladaceae. The genus is found globally, but is usually overlooked. It is the smallest of all the hornworts, with a yellow-green gametophyte thallus that is seldom more than a centimeter in diameter, and usually much smaller.

The genus Notothylas is also unusual among hornworts in that the sporophyte is bullet-shaped and does not grow very large (less than two millimeters). The sporophytes grow outwards rather than upwards, and like Megaceros, there are no stomata on the surface of the sporophyte. The elater cells do not grow helical thickenings.

Unlike many hornworts, species in Notothylas tolerate full sunlight.

A number of classification systems place Notothylas in its own order Notothyladales (frequently misspelled Notothylales in the literature). This classification is based on the assumption that the unique physical characteristics of the genus reflect an early divergence from other hornworts. However, this assumption is not supported by either phylogenetic analysis or fossil evidence. More recent classifications expand the definition of the family Notothyladaceae to include four other genera.
