= Anthoceros tristanianus =

Scientific classification
- Kingdom: Plantae
- Clade: Embryophytes
- Division: Anthocerotophyta
- Class: Anthocerotopsida
- Order: Anthocerotales
- Family: Anthocerotaceae
- Genus: Anthoceros
- Species: A. tristanianus

Binomial name
- Anthoceros tristanianus Villarreal, Engel & Váňa

Species of hornwort

Anthoceros tristanianus is a species of hornwort that belongs to the family Anthocerotoceae. This species has been reported in the coniferous forests of Central Mexico and in Colombia. It also occurs on the volcanic islands of Tristan da Cunha in the Southern Atlantic Ocean.

== Description ==
The thallus has a dark green color and is around 13.1-17 mm long and 3-6.2 mm wide. The margins of this species are lobulated and lack dorsal lamellae. The spores are around 40-75 μm in size.
