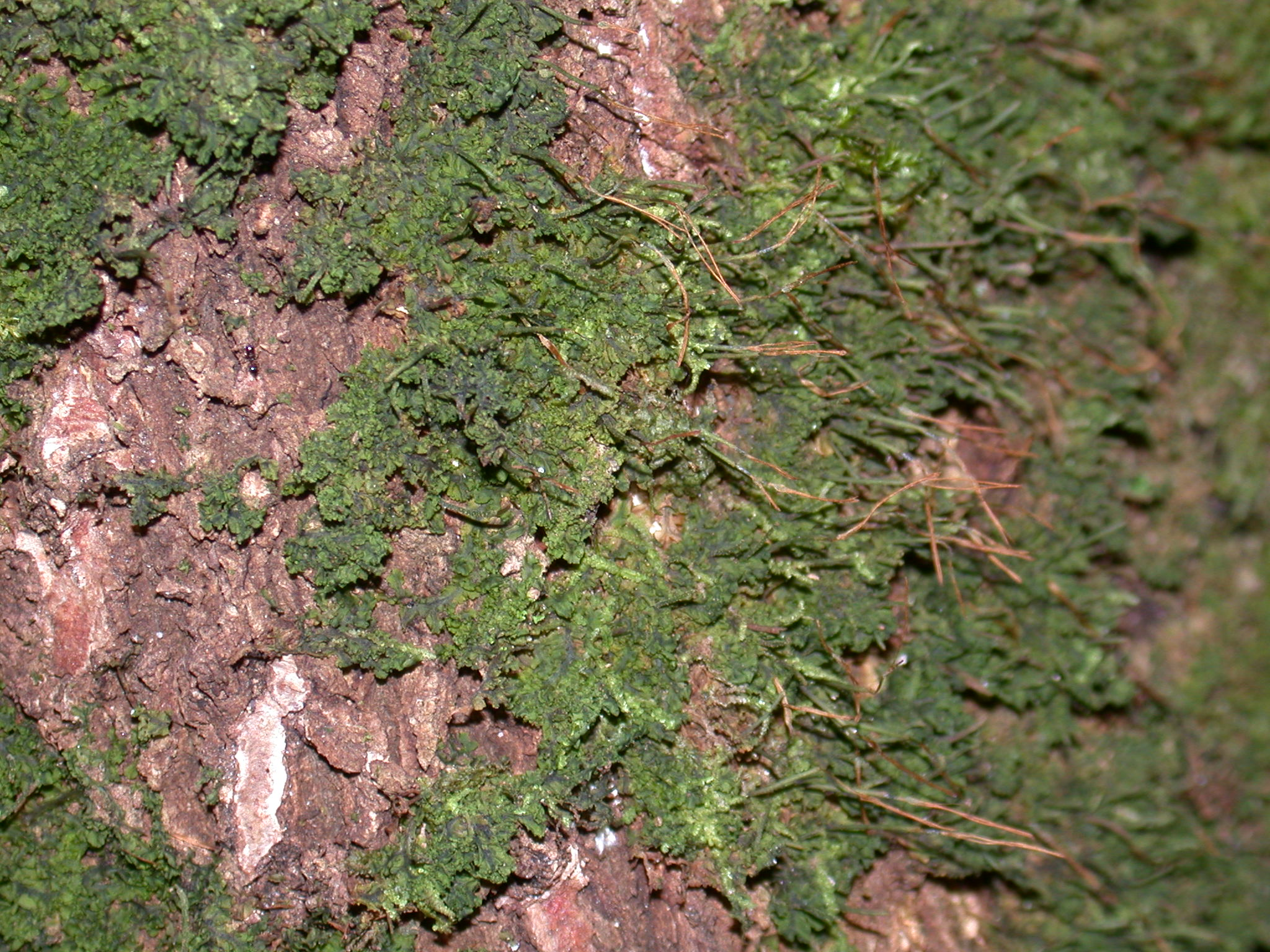
- Dendroceros sp. Nees growing on the bark of a tree

Scientific classification
- Kingdom: Plantae
- Division: Anthocerotophyta
- Class: Anthocerotopsida
- Order: Dendrocerotales
- Family: Dendrocerotaceae
- Genus: Dendroceros; Nees in Gottsche, Lindenb. & Nees

Type species
- Dendroceros crispus (Swartz 1788) Nees 1846

Species
- See text

= Dendroceros =

Genus of hornworts

Dendroceros is a genus of hornworts in the family Dendrocerotaceae. The genus contains about 51 species native to tropical and sub-tropical regions of the world.

== Description ==
The epiphytic and epiphyllous Dendroceros is the only desiccation-tolerant hornwort genus. The gametophyte is yellowish-green and usually less than one-half cm wide. The thallus branches in a bifurcating pattern. In the subgenus Apoceros, there are cavities in the central strand of the thallus. The edges of the thallus are only a single layer of cells thick and have an undulating margin. It is common to find symbiotic colonies of blue-green bacteria (usually Nostoc) growing among the cells. Under a microscope, the epidermal cells have trigones.

The sporophyte is erect when mature, growing up to 5 cm tall. Unlike many hornworts, the surface of the Dendroceros sporophyte lacks stomata, as do the sporophytes of the related genera Megaceros and Nothoceros. The interior of the sporophyte differentiates into a central column and a surrounding mass of spores and elater cells, with a distinct spiral. The spores are green and multicellular with an ornamented surface.

== Classification ==
Cladogram of living Dendroceros

- - (Cichoraceus)
    D. cichoraceus (Montagne 1845) Stephani 1916
  - - (Dendroceros)
      - D. paivae Garcia, Sérgio & Villarreal 2012
      - - - D. javanicus (Nees 1830) Nees 1846
          - D. validus Stephani 1917
        - - D. breutelii Nees 1846
          - - D. crispus (Swartz 1788) Nees 1846
            - D. tubercularis Hattori 1944
    - - (Apoceros)
        - D. cucullatus Stephani 1923
        - D. difficilis Stephani 1917
      - (Nodulosus)
        - - D. africanus Stephani 1917
          - D. borbonicus Stephani 1892
        - - D. granulatus Mitten 1871
          - D. crispatus (Hooker 1830) Nees 1917

Current classification by Söderström et al. 2016.

Genus Dendroceros Nees 1846

- D. australis Stephani 1909
- D. crassicostatus Stephani 1917
- D. exalatus Stephani 1909c
- D. gracilis Stephani 1917b
- D. humboldtensis Hürlimann 1960
- D. rarus Stephani 1917b
- D. reticulus Herzog 1950b
- D. subtropicus Wild 1893
- D. tahitensis Ångström 1873
- D. vesconianus Gottsche ex Bescherelle 1898
- D. wattsianus Stephani 1909
- Subgenus (Cichoraceus) Peñaloza-Bojacá & Maciel-Silva 2019
  - D. cichoraceus (Montagne 1845) Stephani 1916
- Subgenus (Dendroceros) Nees 1846
  - D. acutilobus Stephani 1909
  - D. adglutinatus (Hooker & Taylor 1845) Gottsche, Lindenberg & Nees 1846
  - D. allionii Stephani 1917
  - D. breutelii Nees 1846
  - D. crassinervis (Nees 1846) Stephani 1917
  - D. crispus (Swartz 1788) Nees 1846
  - D. foliicola Hasegawa 1980
  - D. herasii Infante 2010
  - D. javanicus (Nees 1830) Nees 1846
  - D. paivae Garcia, Sérgio & Villarreal 2012
  - D. rigidus Stephani 1917
  - D. subplanus Stephani 1909
  - D. tubercularis Hattori 1944
  - D. validus Stephani 1917
- Subgenus (Nodulosus) Peñaloza-Bojacá & Maciel-Silva 2019
  - D. africanus Stephani 1917
  - D. borbonicus Stephani 1892
  - D. crispatus (Hooker 1830) Nees 1917
  - D. granulatus Mitten 1871
  - D. japonicus Stephani 1909
- Subgenus (Apoceros) Schuster 1987b
  - D. cavernosus Hasegawa 1980
  - D. cucullatus Stephani 1923
  - D. difficilis Stephani 1917
  - D. muelleri Stephani 1889
  - D. ogeramnangus Piippo 1993
  - D. pedunculatus Stephani 1909
  - D. seramensis Hasegawa 1986
  - D. subdifficilis Hattori 1951

== Habitat ==
Dendroceros grows on humid ground, rocky outcrops, and on the sides of trees. Its name literally means "tree horn".
