= Anthoceros bharadwajii =

Scientific classification
- Kingdom: Plantae
- Clade: Embryophytes
- Division: Anthocerotophyta
- Class: Anthocerotopsida
- Order: Anthocerotales
- Family: Anthocerotaceae
- Genus: Anthoceros
- Species: A. bharadwajii

Binomial name
- Anthoceros bharadwajii Udar & A.K.Asthana

Species of hornwort

Anthoceros bharadwajii is a species of hornwort that belongs to the family Anthocerotaceae. This genus has been recorded occurring in India, Southeast Asia and China with specimens with affinities similar to this species being found in Eastern Africa.
