= Anthoceros angustifolius =

Scientific classification
- Kingdom: Plantae
- Division: Anthocerotophyta
- Class: Anthocerotopsida
- Order: Anthocerotales
- Family: Anthocerotaceae
- Genus: Anthoceros
- Species: A. angustifolius

Binomial name
- Anthoceros angustifolius Gottsche, Lindenb. & Nees

Species of hornwort

Anthoceros angustifolius is a species of hornwort belonging to the family Anthocerotaceae.
