= Anthoceros neesii =

Conservation status
- Endangered (IUCN 3.1)

Scientific classification
- Kingdom: Plantae
- Division: Anthocerotophyta
- Class: Anthocerotopsida
- Order: Anthocerotales
- Family: Anthocerotaceae
- Genus: Anthoceros
- Species: A. neesii

Binomial name
- Anthoceros neesii Prosk.

Species of hornwort

Anthoceros neesii is a species of hornwort in the Anthocerotaceae family. It is found in Austria, the Czech Republic, Germany, and Poland. Its natural habitat is unknown; today it is only found growing in crop fields.
