= Hattorioceros =

Scientific classification
- Kingdom: Plantae
- Division: Anthocerotophyta
- Class: Anthocerotopsida
- Order: Notothyladales
- Family: Notothyladaceae
- Genus: Hattorioceros (J.Haseg.) J.Haseg.

Genus of plants

Hattorioceros is a genus of hornworts belonging to the family Anthocerotaceae.

Only one species is known, Hattorioceros striatisporus (J Haseg.) J.Haseg.

The genus name of Hattorioceros is in honour of Sinsuke (or Sinske and Shinsuke) Hattori (1915-1992), who was a Japanese botanist (Bryology) and Professor of Botany at the University of Tokyo.

The genus was circumscribed by Jiro Hasegawa in J. Hattori Bot. Lab. vol.76 on page 32 in 1994.
