= Sphaerosporoceros =

Scientific classification
- Kingdom: Plantae
- Division: Anthocerotophyta
- Class: Anthocerotopsida
- Order: Anthocerotales
- Family: Anthocerotaceae
- Genus: Sphaerosporoceros; Hässel

Species
- Sphaerosporoceros adscendens Sphaerosporoceros granulatus

Genus of hornworts

Sphaerosporoceros is a genus in the hornwort family Anthocerotaceae. It includes only two species, both originally published as species of Anthoceros but since transferred to the new genus.
