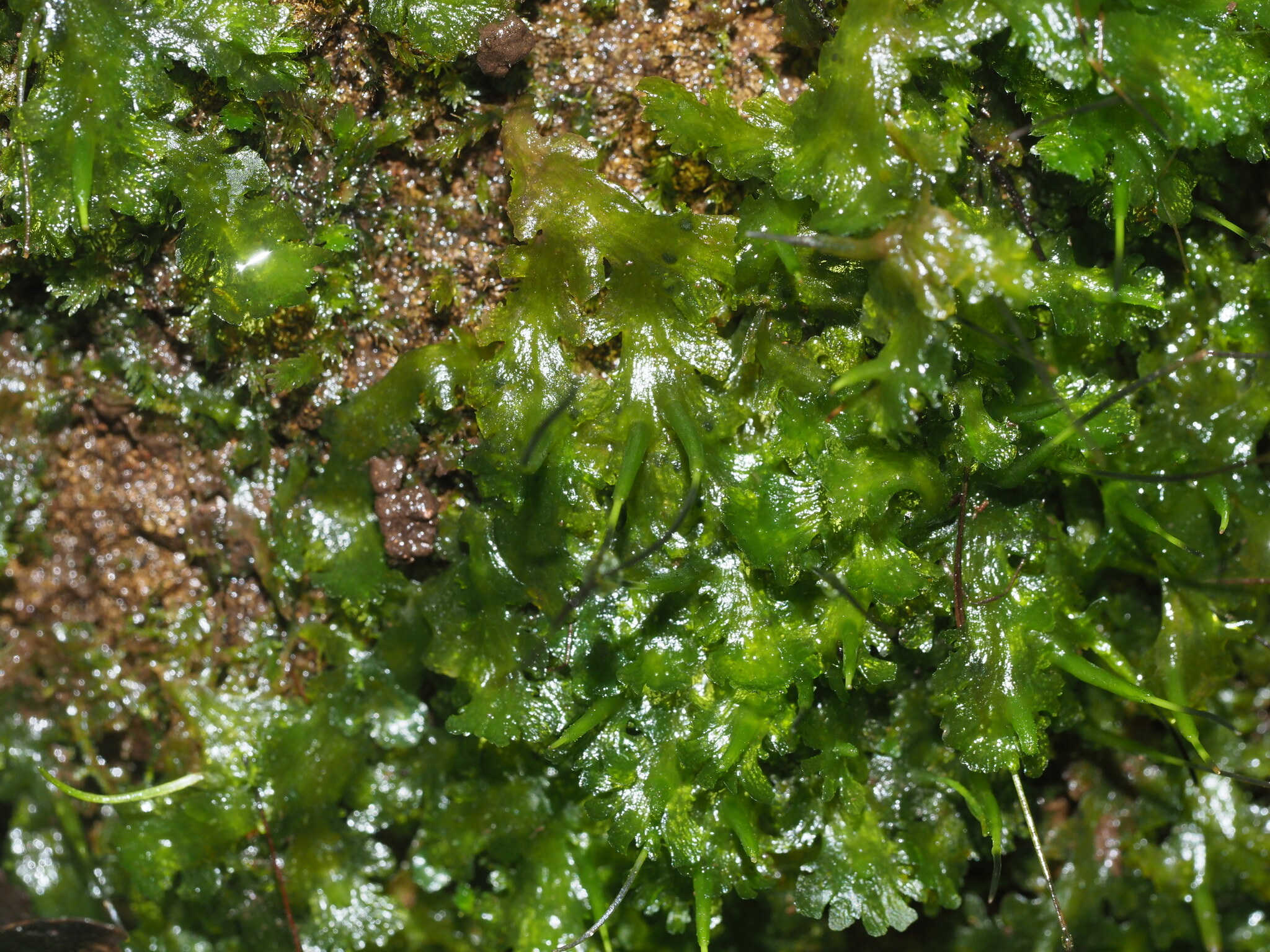
- Folioceros fuciformis

Scientific classification
- Kingdom: Plantae
- Clade: Embryophytes
- Division: Anthocerotophyta
- Class: Anthocerotopsida
- Order: Anthocerotales
- Family: Anthocerotaceae
- Genus: Folioceros; Bharad.

Type species
- Folioceros assamicus Bharadwaj 1971

Species
- F. amboinensis; F. apiahynus; F. argillaceus; F. assamicus; F. dilatatus; F. dixitianus; F. fuciformis; F. glandulosus; F. harrietii; F. incurvus; F. indicus; F. kashyapii; F. khandalensis; F. mangaloreus; F. paliformis; F. physocladus; F. pinnilobus; F. satpurensis; F. udarii; F. vesiculosus

Synonyms
- Aspiromitus (Folioceros) (Bhardwaj 1971) Schuster 1987

= Folioceros =

Genus of hornworts

Folioceros is a genus of hornworts in the family Anthocerotaceae. The genus is common locally in the tropical and subtropical regions of Asia, growing on moist rocks, in fallow fields, and near waterfalls. It has a yellow-green gametophyte thallus that is crispy and translucent, with short branchings that are almost pinnate. Plants are usually less than a centimeter wide and 3 centimeters long. They may be monoicous or dioicous.

The genus Folioceros was formally diagnosed by the botanist D. C. Bharadwaj and based on the type species F. assamicus. Some features that he cited as distinguishing the genus were:

- Pseudoelaters less than 7 um wide and more than 300 um long.
- Spore ornamentation that is spinose or baculate, rather than reticulate.
- Thallus with large cavities formed by splitting of the internal tissue.

The classification system of Hässel de Menendez places Folioceros in its own family Foliocerotaceae and order Foliocerotales. This classification is based on a cladistic morphological analysis, but has not been generally accepted or supported by additional research in the literature. For the present, Folioceros is usually placed in the Anthocerotaceae.
