= Pentatricopeptide repeat =

Identifiers
- Symbol: PPR
- Pfam: PF01535
- Pfam clan: CL0020
- InterPro: IPR002885
- PROSITE: PS51375
Available protein structures:
- Pfam: structures / ECOD
- PDB: RCSB PDB; PDBe; PDBj
- PDBsum: structure summary

The pentatricopeptide repeat (PPR) is a 35-amino acid sequence motif. Pentatricopeptide-repeat-containing proteins are a family of proteins commonly found in the plant kingdom. They are distinguished by the presence of tandem degenerate PPR motifs and by the relative lack of introns in the genes coding for them.

Approximately 450 such proteins have been identified in the Arabidopsis genome, and another 477 in the rice genome. Despite the large size of the protein family, genetic data suggest that there is little or no redundancy of function between the PPR proteins in Arabidopsis.

The purpose of PPR proteins is currently under dispute. It has been shown that a good deal of those in Arabidopsis interact (often essentially) with mitochondria and other organelles and that they are possibly involved in RNA editing. However many trans proteins are required for this editing to occur and research continues to look at which proteins are needed.

The structure of the PPR has been resolved. It folds into a helix-turn-helix structure similar to those found in the tetratricopeptide repeat. Several repeats of the protein forms a ring around a single-strand RNA molecule in a sequence-sensitive way reminiscent of TAL effectors.

== Examples ==
Human genes encoding proteins containing this repeat include:

- DENND4A, DENND4B, DENND4C
- LRPPRC
- PTCD1, PTCD2, PTCD3
- MRPS27
