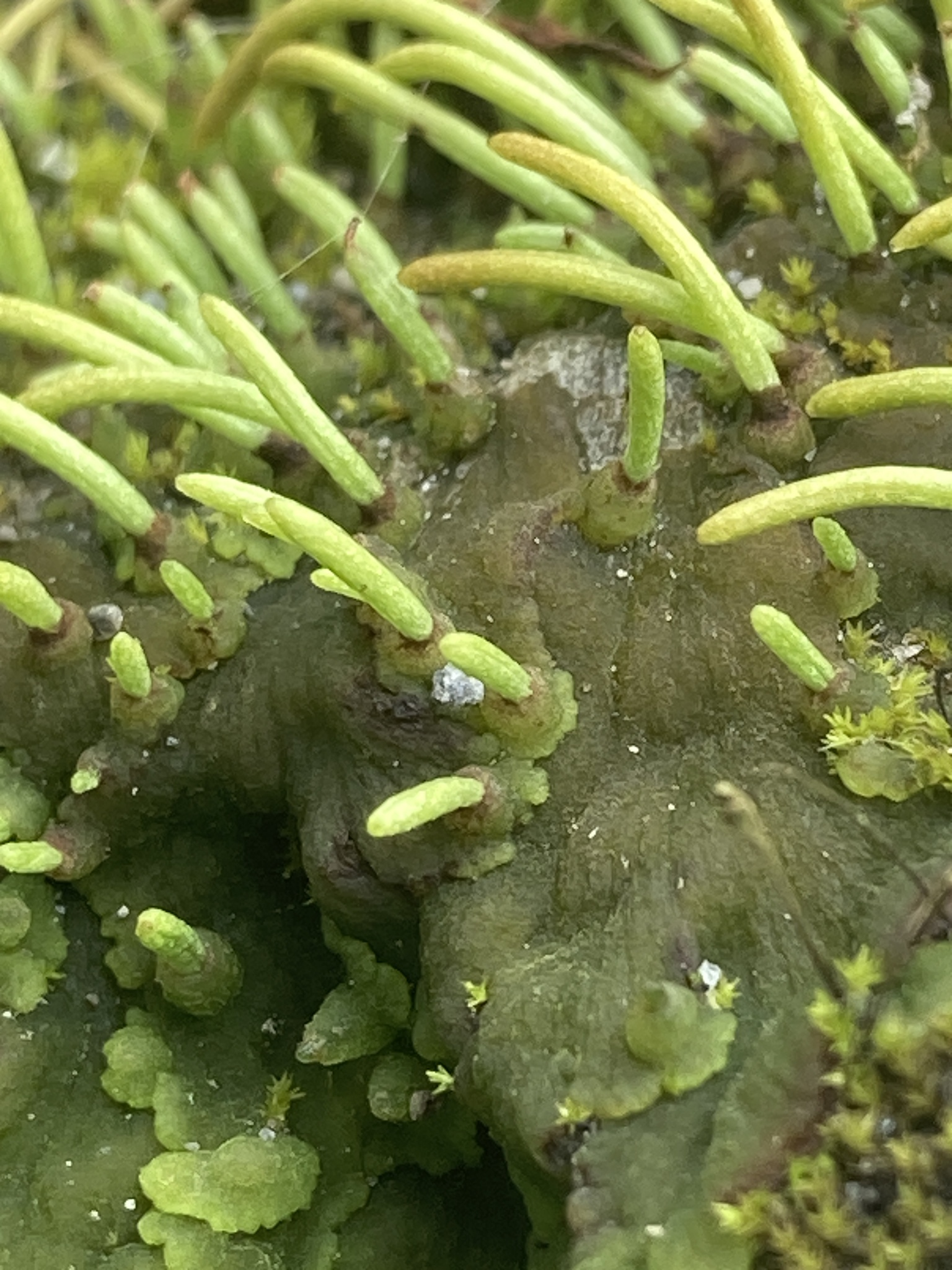
- Leiosporoceros dussii

Scientific classification
- Kingdom: Plantae
- Clade: Embryophytes
- Division: Anthocerotophyta
- Class: Leiosporocerotopsida; Stotler & Crand.-Stotl. emend Duff
- Order: Leiosporocerotales; Hässel
- Family: Leiosporocerotaceae; Hässel
- Genus: Leiosporoceros; Hässel
- Species: L. dussii

Binomial name
- Leiosporoceros dussii (Steph.) Hässel

Synonyms
- Anthoceros dussii Steph.

= Leiosporoceros =

Genus of hornworts

Leiosporoceros dussii is the only species in the hornwort genus Leiosporoceros. The species is placed in a separate family, order, and class for being "genetically and morphologically distinct from all other hornwort lineages." Cladistic analysis of genetic data supports a position at the base of the hornwort clade. Physical characteristics that distinguish the group include unusually small spores that are monolete and unornamented. Additionally, there are unique strands of Nostoc (cyanobacteria) that grow inside the plant parallel with its direction of growth. Unlike other hornworts with symbiotic cyanobacteria that enters through mucilage clefts, the mucilage clefts in Leiosporoceros are only present in young plants and close permanently once the cyanobacterial colonies have been established. Mycorrhiza and pyrenoids are absent. Male plants have been found in Panama.
