= List of British county and local bryophyte floras =

The following is a list of published bryophyte floras covering counties or other local areas of Britain, together with a list of vascular plant floras which also contain bryophyte lists.

== Full bryophyte floras ==
=== England ===
- Hill, Mark O. and Bryan Edwards (2003) The Mosses and Liverworts of Dorset ISBN 0-9511394-2-8
- Perry, Irene G. (2001) Bryophyte Atlas of Exmoor National Park

=== Wales ===
- Bosanquet, Sam et al. (2005) The Mosses and Liverworts of Carmarthenshire ISBN 0-9552022-0-5
- Woods, R. G. (2006) The Mosses and Liverworts of Brecknock ISBN 0-9547659-1-5

== Vascular plant floras containing bryophyte lists ==
- Bowen, Humphry (2000) The Flora of Dorset ISBN 1-874357-16-1 (Chapter 7, Dorset Bryophytes, pp. 290 – 302)
- Brewis, Anne, Paul Bowman and Francis Rose (1996) The Flora of Hampshire ISBN 0-946589-34-8 (hardback) and ISBN 0-946589-53-4 (paperback) (Chapter XII, The Bryophyte Flora, by A. C. Crundwell and Francis Rose, pp. 325 – 341)
- Linton, William Richardson (1903) Flora of Derbyshire: Flowering Plants, Higher Cryptogams, Mosses and Hepatics, Characeae. London: Bemrose, pp. 337–421

== See also ==
- A Checklist and Census Catalogue of British and Irish Bryophytes (book)
