= Phymatoceros =

Scientific classification
- Kingdom: Plantae
- Division: Anthocerotophyta
- Class: Anthocerotopsida
- Subclass: Dendrocerotidae
- Order: Phymatocerotales; Duff et al.
- Family: Phymatocerotaceae; Duff et al.
- Genus: Phymatoceros; Stotl., Doyle & Crand.-Stotl. emend Duff et al.

Type species
- Phymatoceros bulbiculosus (Brotero 1804) Stotler, Doyle & Crandall-Stotler 2005

Species
- P. binsarensis; P. bulbiculosus; P. phymatodes

Genus of hornworts

Phymatoceros is the only genus in the hornwort family Phymatocerotaceae and order Phymatocerotales. It includes only three species.
