= Mesoceros =

Scientific classification
- Kingdom: Plantae
- Division: Anthocerotophyta
- Class: Anthocerotopsida
- Order: Notothyladales
- Family: Notothyladaceae
- Genus: Mesoceros; Piippo

Genus of plants

Mesoceros is a genus of hornworts belonging to the family Notothyladaceae.

The species of this genus are found in Australia.

Species:

- Mesoceros mesophoros Piippo
- Mesoceros porcatus Piippo
