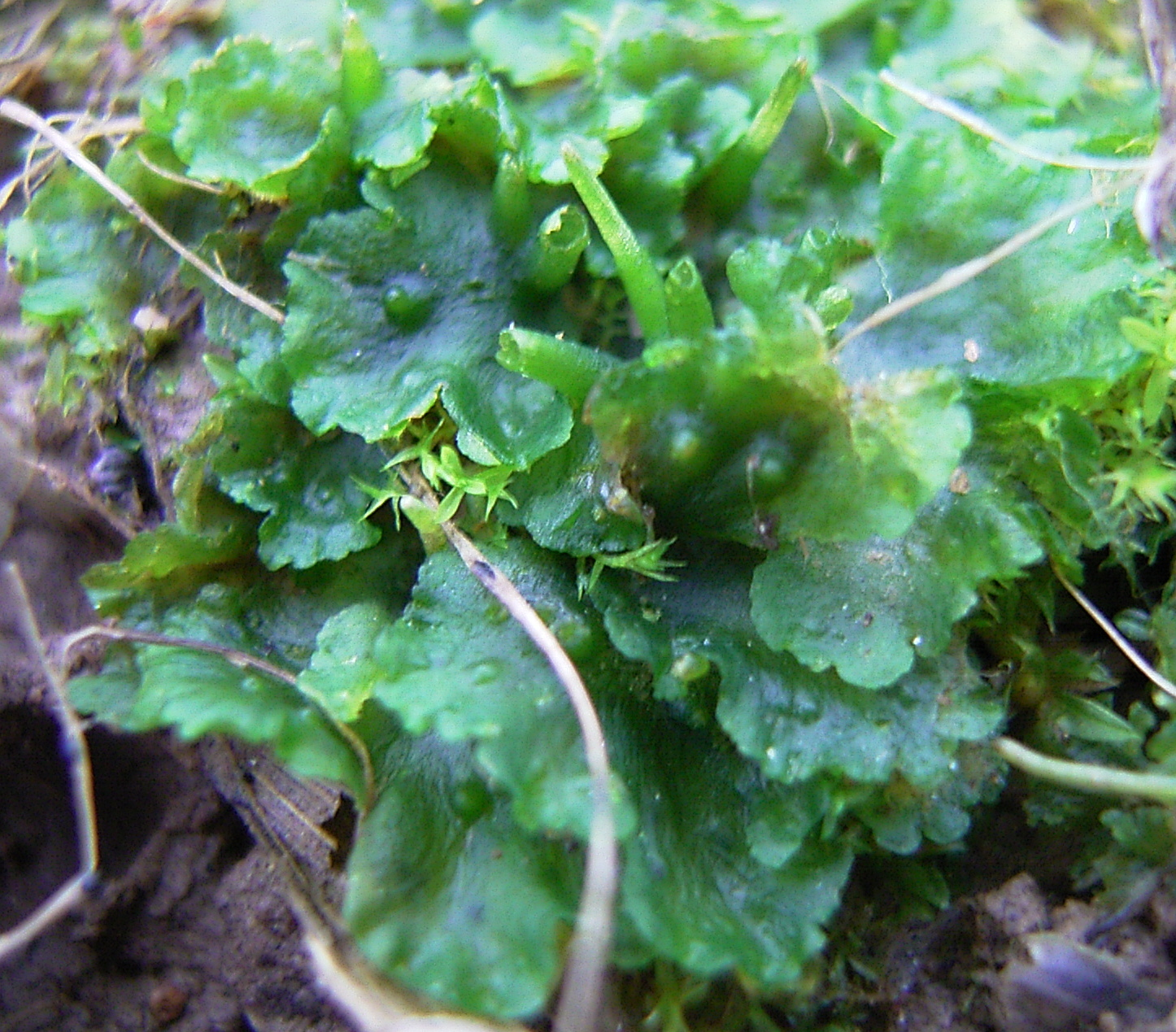
- Phaeoceros laevis (L.) Prosk.

Scientific classification
- Kingdom: Plantae
- Division: Anthocerotophyta
- Class: Anthocerotopsida
- Subclass: Notothylatidae; R.J.Duff
- Order: Notothyladales; Hyvönen & Piippo
- Family: Notothyladaceae (Milde) Müll. Frib. ex Prosk. emend. Hässel

Type genus
- Notothylas Sull.

Genera
- Hattorioceros; Mesoceros; Notothylas; Paraphymatoceros; Phaeoceros

= Notothyladaceae =

Family of hornworts

The Notothyladaceae is the only family of hornworts in the order Notothyladales.

== Description ==
Plants in the Notothyladaceae grow as a solid, flattened green structure (thallus) without internal air spaces, unlike some other hornwort families that have cavities within their tissues. Their reproductive structures include male organs (antheridia) that develop in small chambers within the thallus, with each chamber typically containing between two and eight antheridia. The spore-producing structures may or may not have tiny pores (stomata) on their surface. The spores range in colour from yellow to blackish and often have a distinctive band (equatorial girdle) around their middle. Within the cells, the chloroplasts (structures responsible for photosynthesis) may or may not contain a central protein body called a pyrenoid.

== Distribution and habitat ==
The family has a global distribution, with different genera showing distinct patterns. The genus Notothylas reaches its highest diversity in India and Nepal, where numerous species have been documented. In these regions, Notothylas species can be found growing on damp soil in both natural and disturbed habitats. Phaeoceros, the largest genus in the family, includes species found worldwide in temperate and tropical regions. Most members of the family prefer moist, shaded environments and are often found growing on bare soil along stream banks, trails, and roadside embankments.

In Guizhou Province, southwest China, a newly described species named Notothylas guizhouensis was reported in 2018. The species is distinguished from congeners by: the lack of a columella, the dehiscence line consisting of two rows of brown, thick-walled cells, the absence of lamellae in the involucre, the epidermal cells of the capsule having a moderately thick wall, the lack of an easily recognisable equatorial girdle of the spore, and the dark brown colour of its mature spores.
