= DENND4A =

Protein-coding gene in the species Homo sapiens

Identifiers
- Aliases: DENND4A, IRLB, MYCPBP, DENN domain containing 4A
- External IDs: OMIM: 600382; MGI: 2142979; GeneCards: DENND4A
Available structures
PDB	Human UniProt search: PDBe RCSB
PDB	List of PDB id codes 2PSN, 3B97

Gene location (Human)
Chr.	Chromosome 15 (human)
Band	15q22.31	Start	65,658,046 bp
Band	15q22.31	End	65,792,293 bp

Gene location (Mouse)
Chr.	Chromosome 9 (mouse)
Band	9|9 C	Start	64,718,622 bp
Band	9|9 C	End	64,826,949 bp
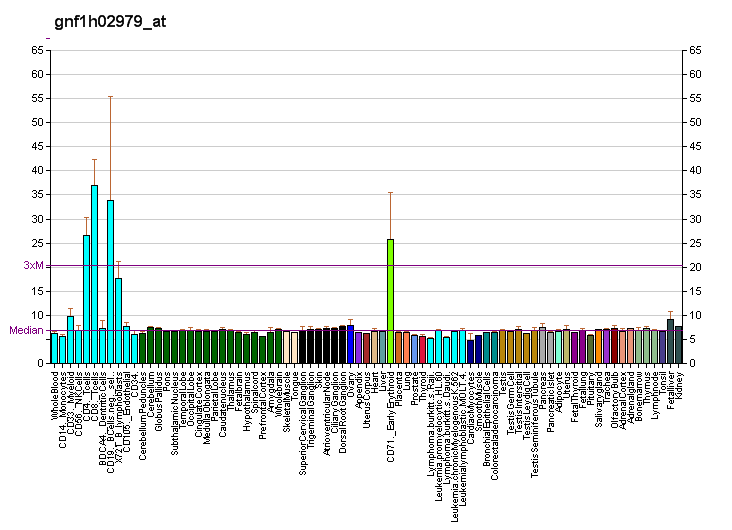

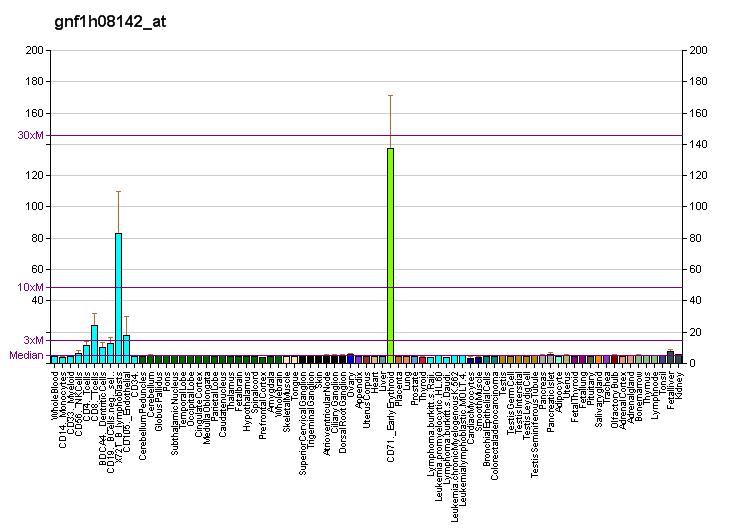

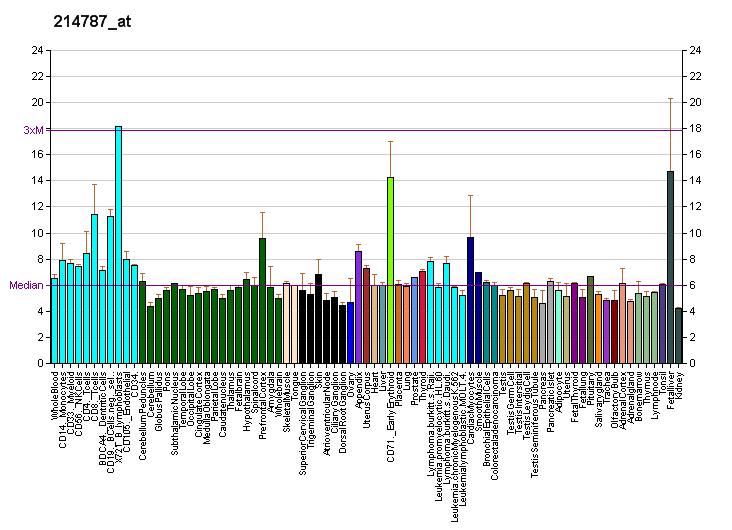
RNA expression pattern
Bgee	Human / Mouse (ortholog); Top expressed in: Achilles tendon; body of pancreas; testicle; cerebellar hemisphere; sural nerve; right hemisphere of cerebellum; epithelium of colon; right lobe of liver; islet of Langerhans; anterior pituitary / Top expressed in: granulocyte; substantia nigra; bone marrow; right lobe of liver; zygote; spleen; blood; pineal gland; piriform cortex; otolith organ; More reference expression data
BioGPS	More reference expression data
Gene ontology
Molecular function	DNA binding; guanyl-nucleotide exchange factor activity; protein binding
Cellular component	nucleus; cytosol
Biological process	regulation of transcription, DNA-templated; transcription, DNA-templated
Sources:Amigo / QuickGO
Orthologs
Databases	NCBI: entry; OMA: entry
Species	Human	Mouse
Entrez	10260	102442
Ensembl	ENSG00000174485	ENSMUSG00000053641
UniProt	Q7Z401	n/a
RefSeq (mRNA)	NM_001144823; NM_005848; NM_001320835; NM_001376919; NM_001376920	NM_001162917; NM_176935
RefSeq (protein)	NP_001138295; NP_001307764; NP_005839; NP_001363848; NP_001363849	n/a
Location (UCSC)	Chr 15: 65.66 – 65.79 Mb	Chr 9: 64.72 – 64.83 Mb
PubMed search
- Wikidata
View/Edit Human	View/Edit Mouse

C-myc promoter-binding protein is a protein that in humans is encoded by the DENND4A gene.
