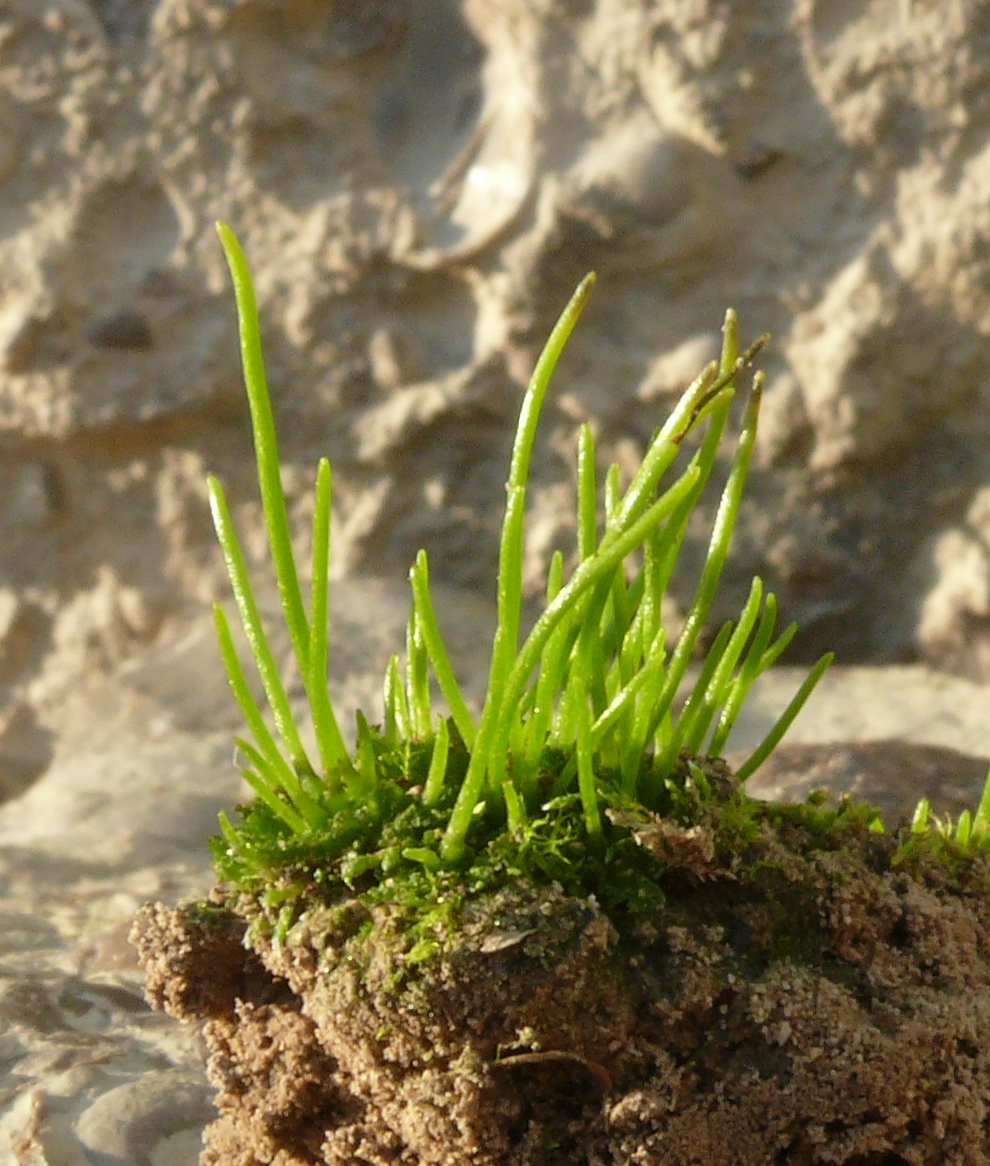
- Anthoceros agrestis
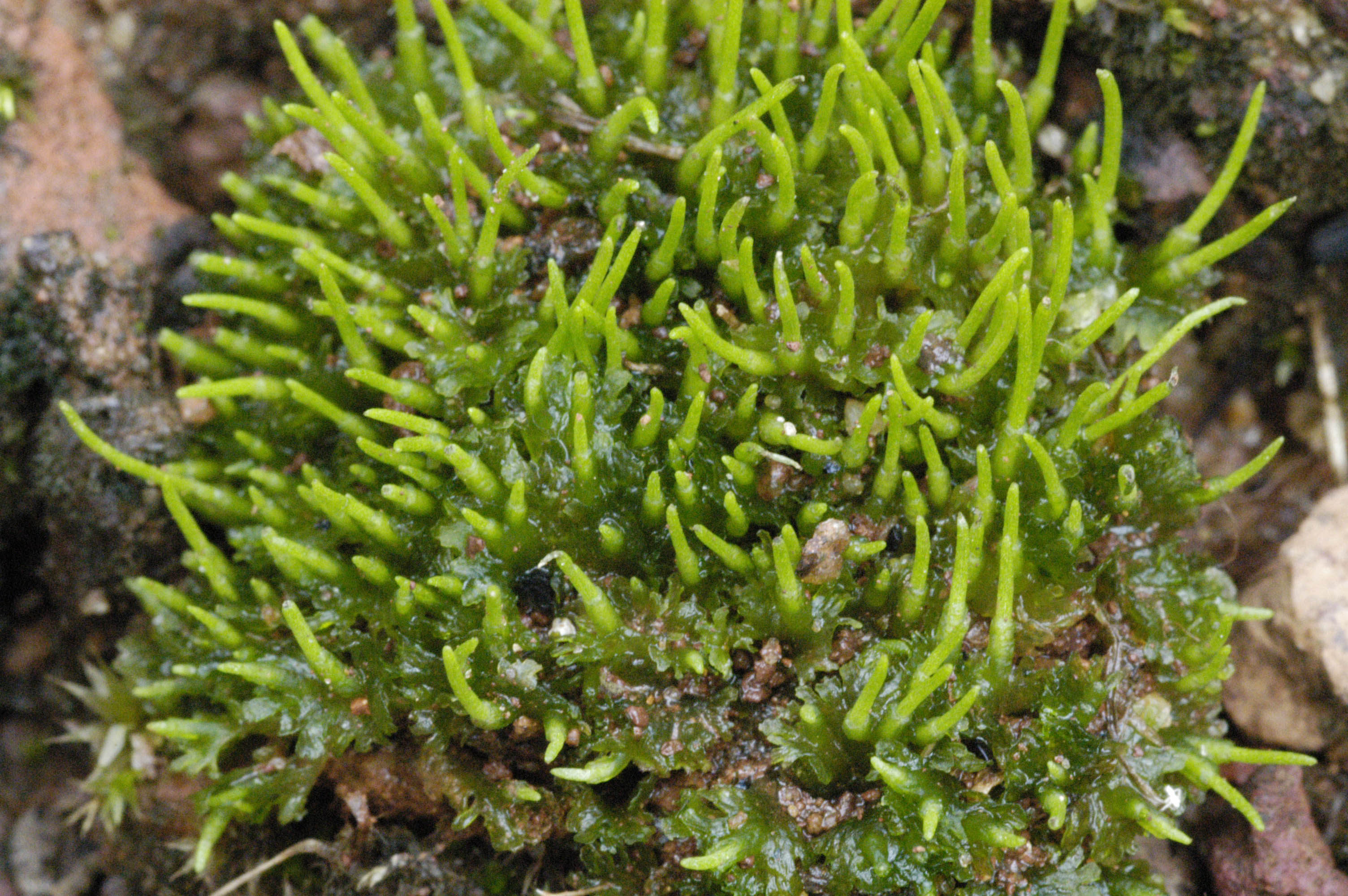
- Anthoceros angustus

Scientific classification
- Kingdom: Plantae
- Division: Anthocerotophyta
- Class: Anthocerotopsida
- Order: Anthocerotales
- Family: Anthocerotaceae
- Genus: Anthoceros; L.

Type species
- Anthoceros punctatus Linnaeus 1753

Species
- See text

Synonyms
- Ceranthus von Linné 1758 ex Gilibert 1787 non Schreb. 1789; Carpoceros Dumortier 1822; Aspiromitus Stephani 1916b; Sphaerosporoceros Hässel 1988; Anthoceros (Sphaerosporoceros) (Hässel 1988) Cargill & Scott 1997; Anthoceros section Fusiformes Grolle 1976; Aspiromitus section Brachyanthoceros Schuster 1992

= Anthoceros =

Genus of hornworts

Anthoceros is a genus of hornworts that belongs to the family Anthocerotaceae. It is distributed globally. Species of Anthoceros are characterized by having a small to medium-sized, green thallus that is more or less lobed along the margins.

== Etymology ==
The name Anthoceros means 'flower horn', referring to the characteristic horn-shaped sporophytes that all hornworts produce.

== Description ==
The spores are dark gray, dark brown or black. This distinguishes it from the related genus Phaeoceros, which produces yellow spores. The thallus lacks air chambers and scales, and has no well defined mid rib. It has unicellular smooth rhizoids in the ventral region. It is irregularly lobed, and exhibits rare dichotomous branching. The thallus has little to no tissue differentiation, being composed of thin, compactly arranged uniform parenchymatous cells.

Anthoceros species are host to species of Nostoc, a symbiotic relationship in which Nostoc provides nitrogen to its host through cells known as heterocysts, and which are able to carry out photosynthesis. The Nostoc colonies are present on the lower ventral surface. They often grow in slime pores, mucilaginous groups of decomposed cells within the plant which open outward through a pore guarded by 2 cells. Nostoc colonies are visible as blue-green patches on the plant body.

The plants grow in moist clay soils on hills, in ditches, and in damp hollows among rocks.

== Reproduction ==
Anthoceros species exhibit many forms of asexual reproduction. Besides fragmentation, a nearly ubiquitous form, these hornworts exhibit tubers, persistent apices, and apospory. Tubers and persistent apices can remain dormant and survive harsh conditions to form new thalli. Apospory, a form of apomixis, involves the formation of diploid gametophyte spores directly from the tissue of the plant's sporophyte.

== Species ==
List of species.

- A. adscendens Lehmann & Lindenberg 1832
- A. agrestis Paton 1979
- A. alpinus Stephani 1923
- A. angustifolius Gottsche, Lindenberg & Nees 1846
- A. angustus Stephani 1916
- A. assamicus Kachroo 1954
- A. bharadwajii Udar & Asthana 1985
- A. buettneri Stephani 1916
- A. capricornii Cargill & Scott 1997
- A. caucasicus Stephani 1923
- A. cavernosus Stephani 1916 non Nees 1838
- A. chambensis Kashyap 1917
- A. chungii Khanna 1938
- A. crispatus Griffith 1849
- A. cristatus Stephani 1916
- A. dimorphus Sim 1926
- A. dissectus Montagne 1846
- A. erectus Kashyap 1915 non Stephani 1916
- A. expansus (Stephani 1916b) Villarreal & Cargill 2015
- A. ferdinandi-muelleri Stephani 1916
- A. fragilis Stephani 1916
- A. fusiformis Austin 1875
- A. gasongorii Gola 1914
- A. granulatus Gottsche 1863 non Colenso 1886
- A. harrisanus (Stephani 1916b) Parihar 1962
- A. helmsii Stephani 1893
- A. jamesonii Taylor ex Mitten 1855
- A. javanicoides Miller 1981
- A. jungermannioides Schweinitz 1821
- A. kajumas (Goebel 1928) Proskauer 1951
- A. khandalensis (Apte & Sane 1942) Proskauer 1951
- A. koshii Khanna 1936
- A. lamellatus Stephani 1916
- A. laminiferus Stephani 1893
- A. macounii Howe 1898
- A. macrosporus Stephani 1916
- A. major Griffith 1849 non Micheli 1729 ex Schmidel 1766 non Smith 1806
- A. maritimus Stephani 1916b
- A. megasporus Meijer 1957
- A. muscoides Colenso 1884
- A. myriandroecius Stephani 1911
- A. natalensis Stephani 1913
- A. neesii Proskauer 1958
- A. niger Stephani 1916
- A. orizabensis (Stephani 1916) Hässel 1990
- A. pandei Udar & Asthana 1985a
- A. patagonicus Hässel 1990
- A. peruvianus Stephani 1916
- A. pinnatus Stephani 1886
- A. punctatus von Linné 1753
- A. pusillus Colenso 1886b non Stephani 1916
- A. rosulans Hasegawa 1986
- A. sahaydrensis Sane 1942
- A. sambesianus Stephani 1916
- A. sampalocensis (Burgeff 1935) Proskauer 1948
- A. scariosus Austin 1869
- A. schroederi Stephani 1912
- A. serratus Stephani 1911b
- A. simulans Howe 1934
- A. spongiosus Stephani 1916
- A. stephanianus (Stephani 1916) Beauverd ex Stephani 1924
- A. subtilis Stephani 1916
- A. telaganus Stephani 1916
- A. tristanianus Villarreal, Engel & Váňa 2013
- A. tuberculatus Lehmann & Lindenberg 1832
- A. venosus Lindenberg & Gottsche 1846 non Spruce 1885
