= Phaeomegaceros =

Scientific classification
- Kingdom: Plantae
- Division: Anthocerotophyta
- Class: Anthocerotopsida
- Order: Dendrocerotales
- Family: Dendrocerotaceae
- Genus: Phaeomegaceros; Duff et al.

Species
- Phaeomegaceros chiloensis Phaeomegaceros coriaceus Phaeomegaceros fimbriatus Phaeomegaceros foveatus Phaeomegaceros hirticalyx Phaeomegaceros skottsbergii Phaeomegaceros squamuliger

Genus of hornworts

Phaeomegaceros is a genus of hornworts in the family Dendrocerotaceae. It includes seven species.
