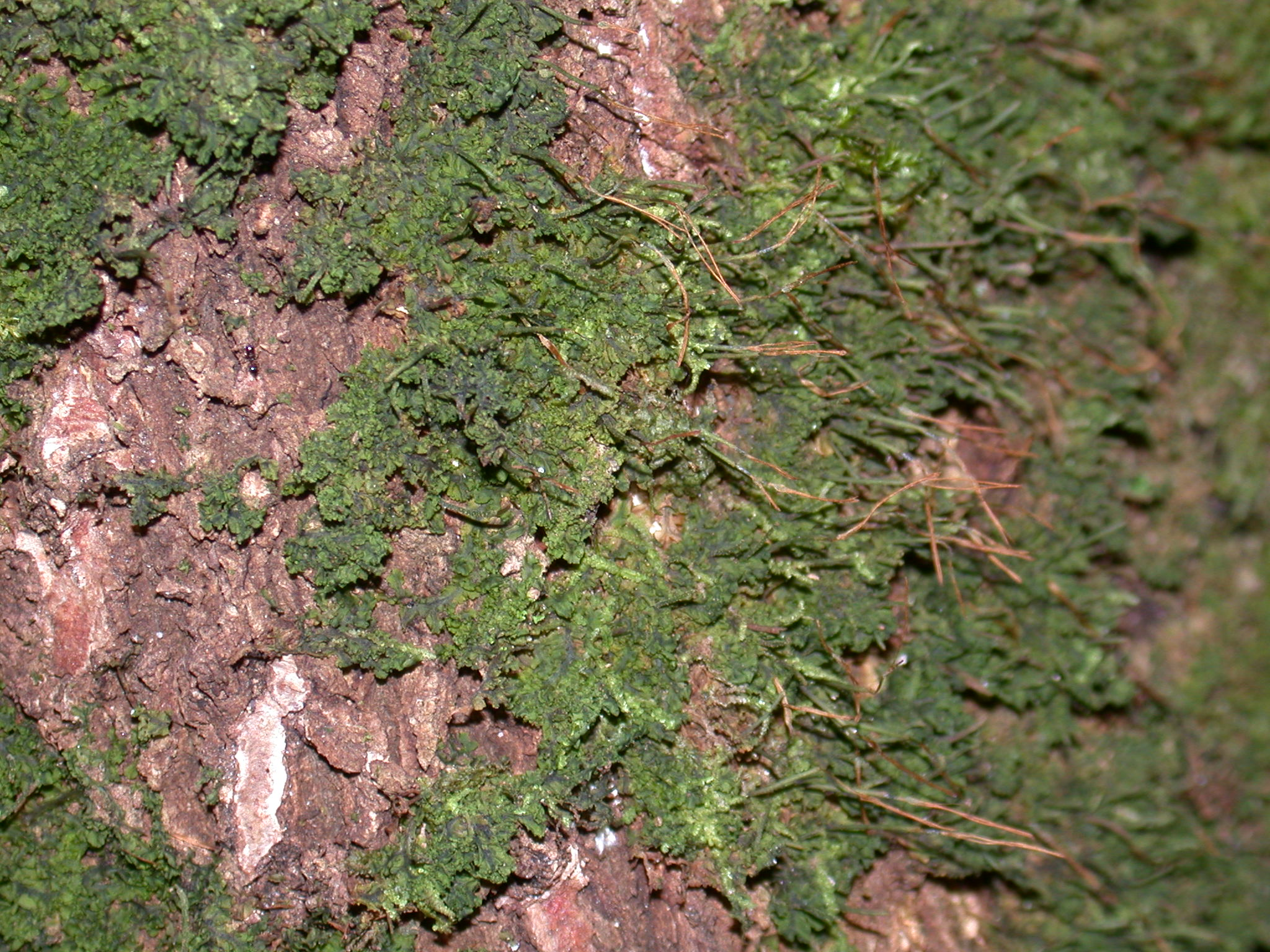
- Dendroceros sp. growing on the bark of a tree

Scientific classification
- Kingdom: Plantae
- Division: Anthocerotophyta
- Class: Anthocerotopsida
- Subclass: Dendrocerotidae
- Order: Dendrocerotales; Hässel emend. Duff et al.
- Family: Dendrocerotaceae (Milde) Hässel emend. Duff et al.

Genera
- Dendroceros; Megaceros; Nothoceros; Phaeomegaceros

= Dendrocerotaceae =

Family of hornworts

The Dendrocerotaceae is the only family of hornworts in the order Dendrocerotales.

== Phylogeny ==
Currently phylogeny.

- Dendrocerotaceae
  - Phaeomegacerotoideae
    Phaeomegaceros Villarreal & Renzaglia 2006 ex Duff et al. 2007
  - Dendrocerotoideae
    - Nothoceros (Schuster 1987) Hasegawa 1994
    - - Megaceros Campbell 1907
      - Dendroceros Nees 1846
