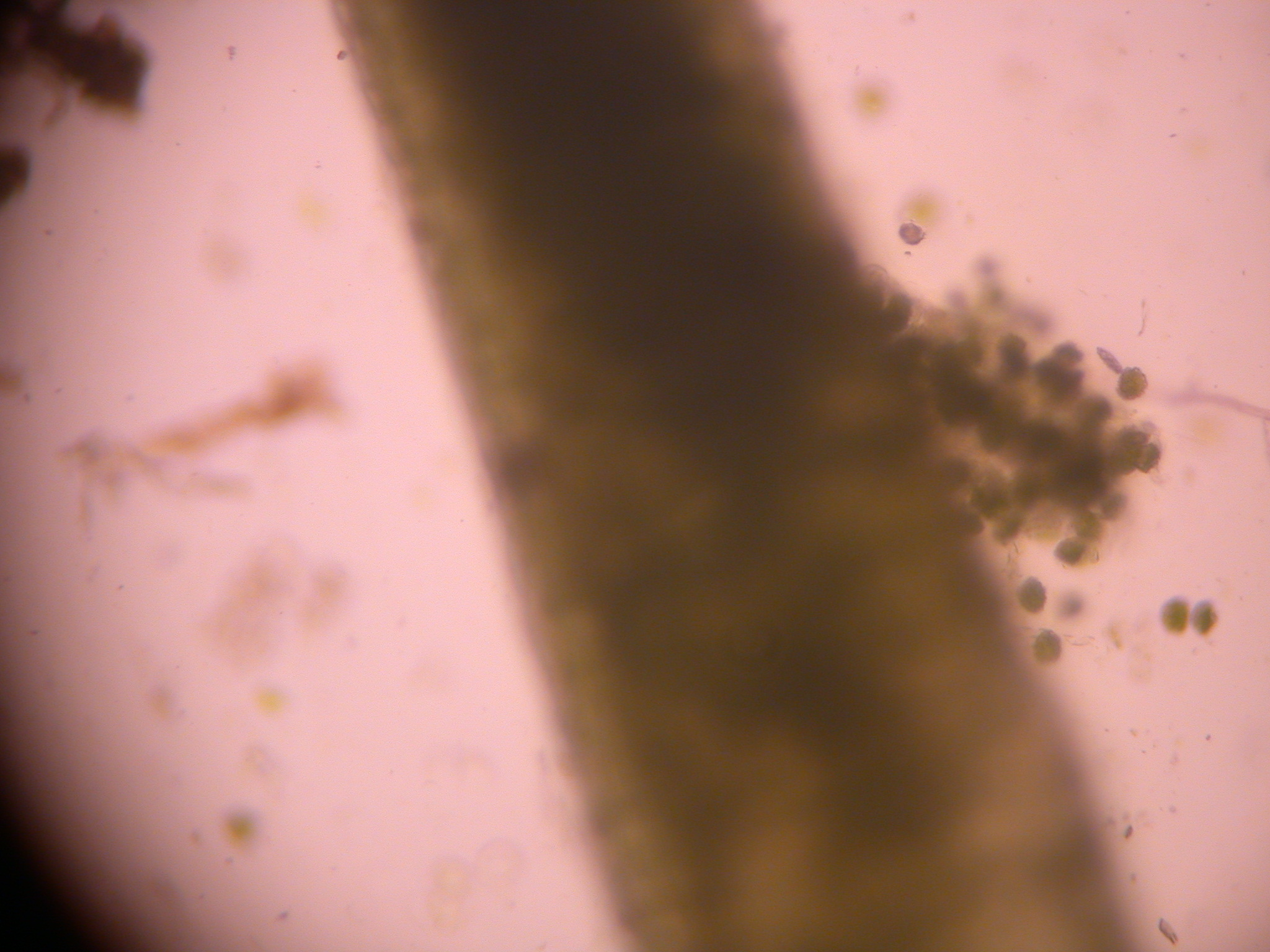
- Nothoceros vincentianus from a South-Brazilian rain forest; Spores pressed out of the sporophyte.

Scientific classification
- Kingdom: Plantae
- Division: Anthocerotophyta
- Class: Anthocerotopsida
- Order: Dendrocerotales
- Family: Dendrocerotaceae
- Genus: Nothoceros (R.M. Schust.) J. Haseg.

Species
- Nothoceros aenigmaticus Nothoceros canaliculatus Nothoceros endiviaefolius Nothoceros fuegiensis Nothoceros giganteus Nothoceros superbus Nothoceros vincentianus

Synonyms
- Notoceros [orth. error]

= Nothoceros =

Genus of hornworts

Nothoceros is a genus of hornworts in the family Dendrocerotaceae. The genus is found in New Zealand, South America, and neotropical and eastern North America.
