= Elater =

Biological spring device

An elater is a cell (or structure attached to a cell) that is hygroscopic, and therefore will change shape in response to changes in moisture in the environment. Elaters come in a variety of forms, but are always associated with plant spores. In many plants that do not have seeds, they function in dispersing the spores to a new location. Mosses do not have elaters, but peristomes which change shape with changes in humidity or moisture to allow for a gradual release of spores.

== Horsetail elaters ==
In the horsetails, elaters are four ribbon-like appendages attached to the spores. These appendages develop from an outer spiral layer of the spore wall. At maturity, the four strips peel away from the inner wall, except at a single point on the spore where all four strips are attached.

Under moist conditions, the elaters curl tightly around the spore. The wet spores tend to stick to each other and to nearby surfaces because of surface tension. When conditions are dry, the spores no longer stick to each other and are more easily dispersed. At that time, the elaters uncoil to extend out from the spore and will catch air currents. The fact that they are extended only when conditions are dry means that successful spore dispersal is more likely.

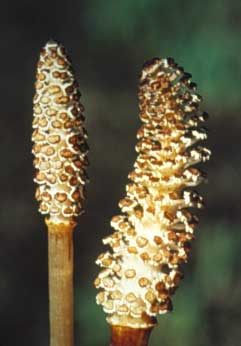
The mature strobili of a horsetail (Equisetum arvense).

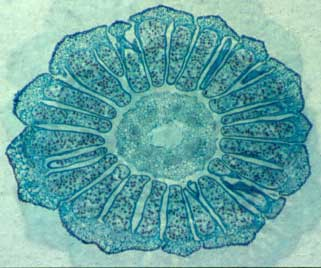
A cross section through a horsetail strobilus, showing spores with elaters.

== Liverwort elaters ==
In the liverworts, also known as Marchantiophyta [example Riccia, Marchantia], elaters are cells that develop in the sporophyte alongside the spores. They are complete cells, usually with helical thickenings at maturity that respond to moisture content.

In most liverworts, the elaters are unattached, but in some leafy species (such as Frullania) a few elaters will remain attached to the inside of the sporangium (spore capsule).

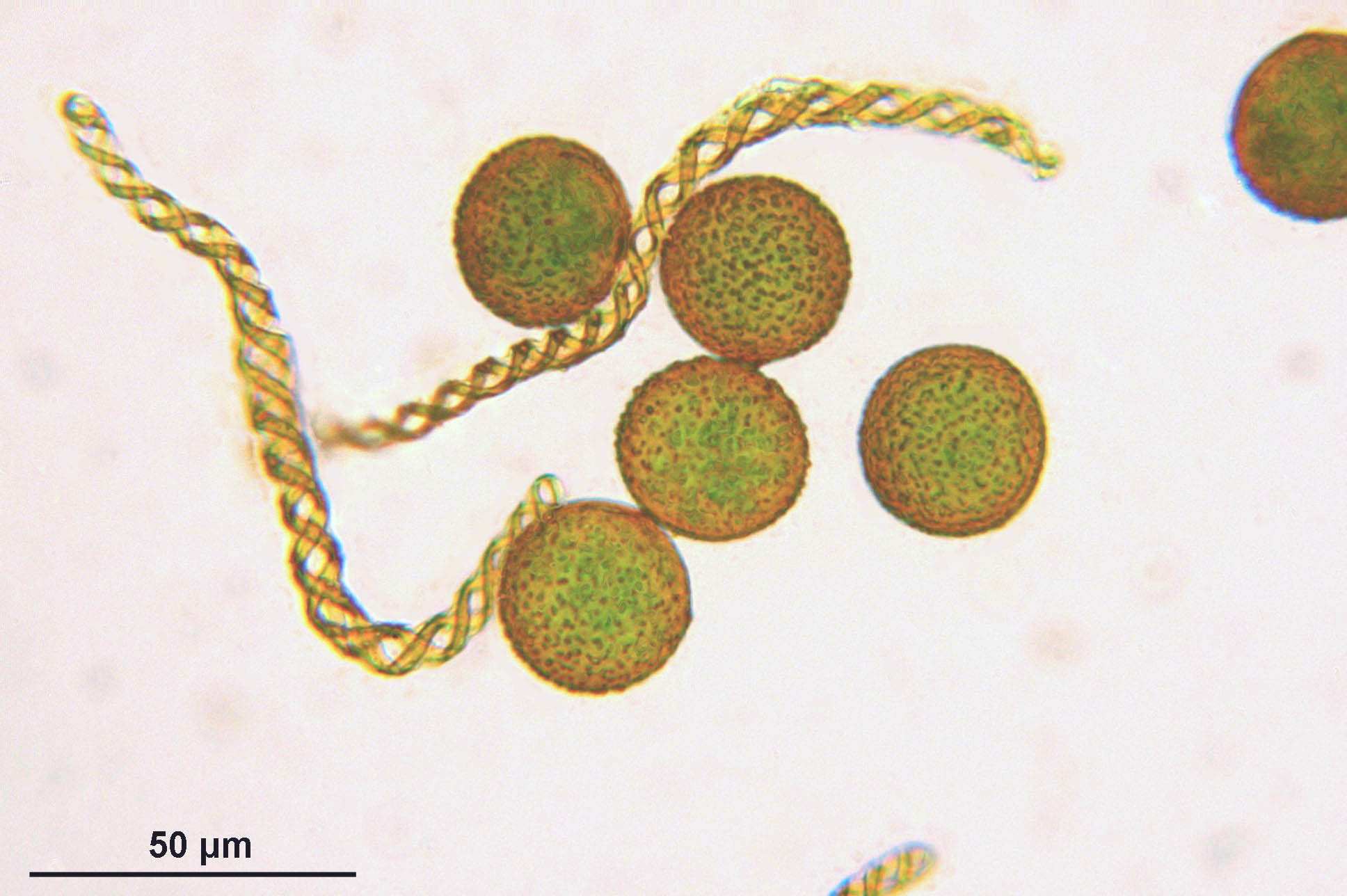
Spores and two elaters of the liverwort Ptilidium.

== Hornwort pseudo-elaters ==
In the hornworts, elaters are branched clusters of cells that develop in the sporophyte alongside the spores. They are complete cells, usually without helical thickenings (except in the Dendrocerotaceae).
