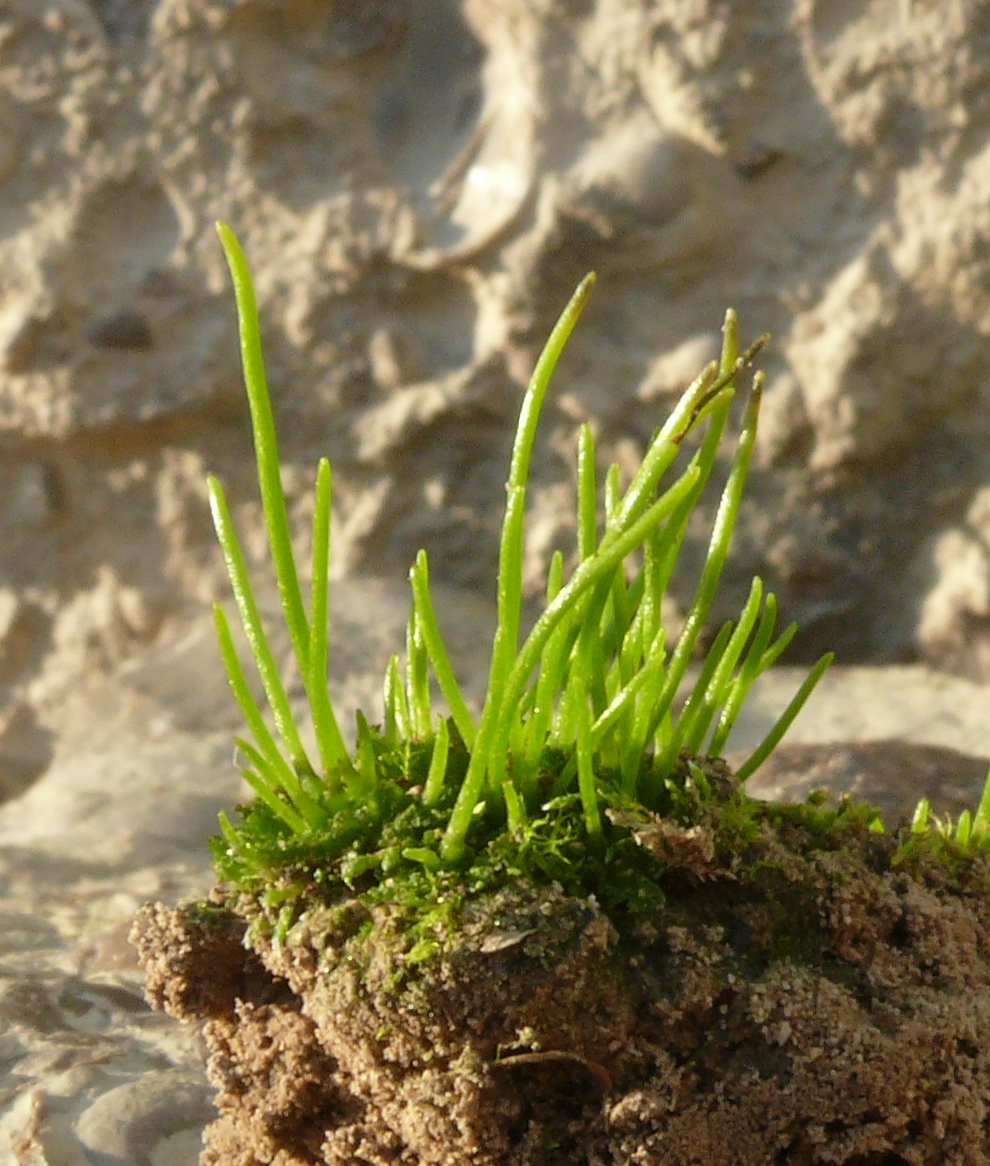
- Anthoceros agrestis

Scientific classification
- Kingdom: Plantae
- Clade: Embryophytes
- Division: Anthocerotophyta
- Class: Anthocerotopsida
- Subclass: Anthocerotidae; Rosenv.
- Order: Anthocerotales; Limpr. in Cohn.
- Family: Anthocerotaceae; Dumort. corr. Trevis. emend Hässel

Genera
- Anthoceros; Folioceros; Sphaerosporoceros

Synonyms
- Carpocerotaceae Dumortier ex Nees 1833; Foliocerotaceae Hässel 1988

= Anthocerotaceae =

Family of hornworts

The Anthocerotaceae is the only family of hornworts in the order Anthocerotales. Anthocerotaceae is characterized by irregular or dichotomous lobing or branching, and a gametophyte lacking distinct pores.
