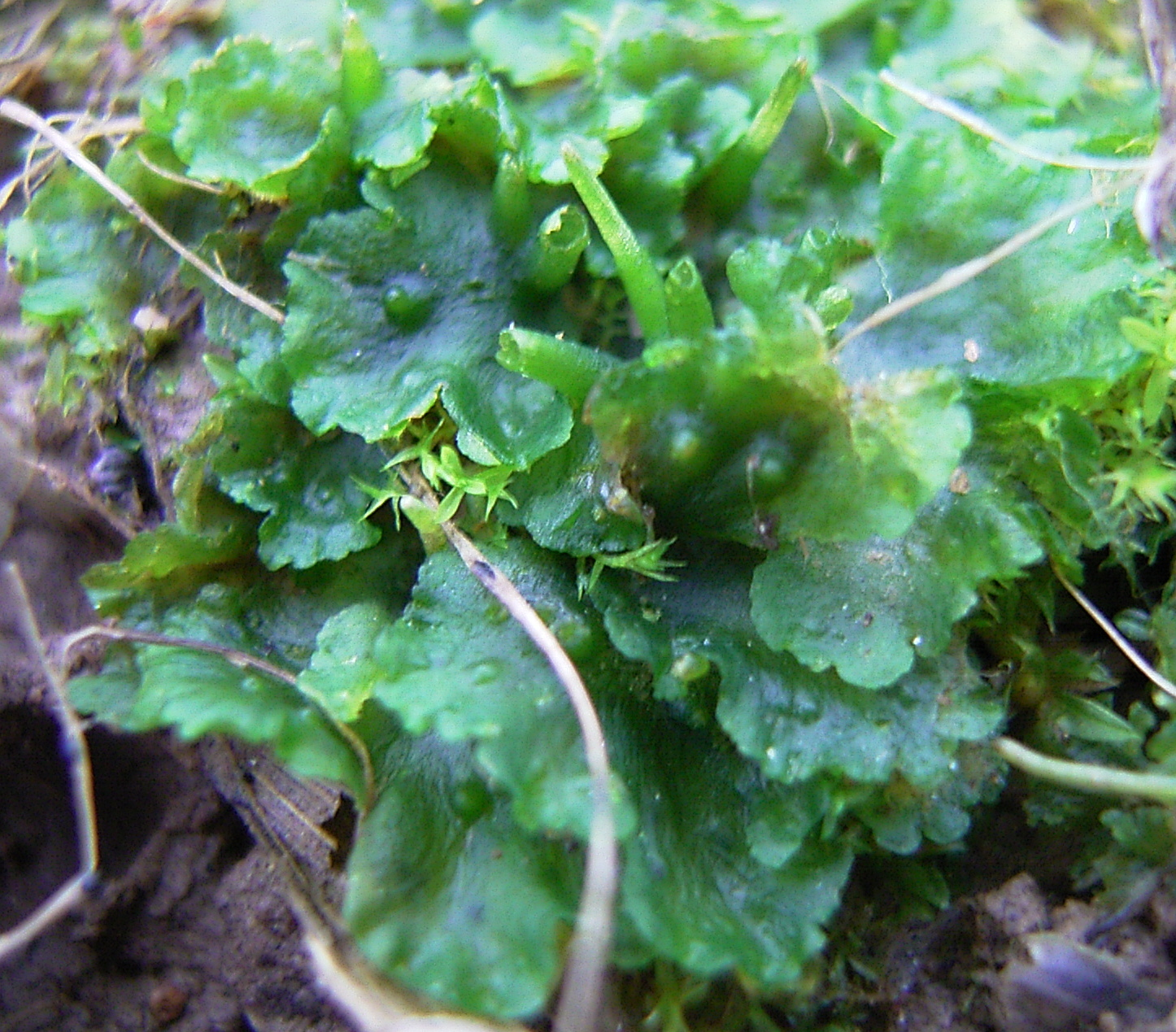
- Phaeoceros laevis (L.) Prosk.

Scientific classification
- Kingdom: Plantae
- Clade: Embryophytes
- Division: Anthocerotophyta; Stotler & Stotl.-Crand., 1977

Classes and orders
- Leiosporocerotopsida: Leiosporocerotales; Anthocerotopsida: Anthocerotales; Dendrocerotales; Notothyladales; Phymatocerotales; see Classification.

Synonyms
- Anthocerotae

= Hornwort =

Hornwort Temporal range: 90–0 Ma Upper Cretaceous (but see text) to present

Division of non-vascular land plants with horn-shaped sporophytes

Hornworts are a group of non-vascular Embryophytes (land plants) constituting the division Anthocerotophyta (/ˌænθoʊˌsɛrəˈtɒfətə, -təˈfaɪtə/). The common name refers to the elongated horn-like structure, which is the sporophyte. As in mosses and liverworts, hornworts have a gametophyte-dominant life cycle, in which cells of the plant carry only a single set of genetic information; the flattened, green plant body of a hornwort is the gametophyte stage of the plant.

Hornworts may be found worldwide, though they tend to grow only in places that are damp or humid. Some species grow in large numbers as tiny weeds in the soil of gardens and cultivated fields. Large tropical and sub-tropical species of Dendroceros may be found growing on the bark of trees.

The total number of species is still uncertain. While there are more than 300 published species names, the actual number could be as low as 100–150 species.

== Description ==
Like all bryophytes, the dominant life phase of a hornwort is the haploid gametophyte. This stage usually grows as a thin rosette or ribbon-like thallus between one and five centimeters in diameter. Hornworts have lost two plastid division-associated genes, ARC3 and FtsZ2, and have just a single chloroplast per cell (monoplastidy), with the exception of the genus Megaceros and some species in the genera Nothoceros and Anthoceros, which have more than one chloroplast per cell (polyplastidy). In the polyplastidic species, and also some of the monoplastidic species, a cellular structure called a pyrenoid is absent. The pyrenoid is a liquid-like organelle which enables a more efficient photosynthesis, has evolved independently five to six times in hornworts and is present in half of the roughly 200 species. It is formed by the fusion of the chloroplast with other organelles and is composed predominantly of RuBisCO, the key enzyme in carbon fixation. By using inorganic carbon transporters and carbonic anhydrases, up to a 50-fold increase in CO_{2} levels can be achieved. This particular feature is very unusual in land plants, unique to hornworts, but is common among algae. They are also the only group of land plants where flavonoids are completely absent.

Many hornworts develop internal mucilage-filled cavities or canals when groups of cells break down. These cavities secrete hormogonium-inducing factors (HIF) that stimulate nearby, free-living photosynthetic cyanobacteria, especially species of Nostoc, to invade and colonize these cavities. Such colonies of bacteria growing inside the thallus give the hornwort a distinctive blue-green color. Symbiotic cyanobacteria have not been reported in Megaceros or Folioceros. There may also be small slime pores on the underside of the thallus. These pores superficially resemble the stomata of other plants.

The horn-shaped sporophyte grows from an archegonium embedded deep in the gametophyte. The growth of the hornwort sporophyte happens from a persistent basal meristem, in contrast to the sporophyte of moss (apical growth) and liverworts (intercalary growth). Unlike liverworts, hornworts have true stomata on their sporophyte as most mosses do. The exceptions are the species Folioceros incurvus, the genus Notothylas and the three closely related genera Megaceros, Nothoceros and Dendroceros, which do not have stomata. Notothylas also differ from other hornworts in having a reduced sporophyte only a few millimeters tall. The sporophyte in hornworts is unique among bryophytes in being long-lived with a persistent photosynthetic capacity. The sporophyte lacks an apical meristem, an auxin-sensitive point of divergence with other land plants some time in the Late Silurian/Early Devonian.

When the sporophyte is mature, it has a multicellular outer layer, a central rod-like columella running up the center, and a layer of tissue in between that produces spores and pseudo-elaters. The pseudo-elaters are multi-cellular, unlike the elaters of liverworts. They have helical thickenings that change shape in response to drying out; they twist and thereby help to disperse the spores. Hornwort spores are relatively large for bryophytes, measuring between 30 and 80 μm in diameter or more. The spores are polar, usually with a distinctive Y-shaped tri-radiate ridge on the proximal surface, and with a distal surface ornamented with bumps or spines.

== Life cycle ==
The life of a hornwort starts from a haploid spore. The spores can be yellow, brown or green. Yellow and brown spores have a thicker wall and contain oils that both protect against desiccation and function as a nutrient storage, allowing them to survive for years. The species Folioceros fuciformis and the genera Megaceros, Nothoceros and Dendroceros have short-lived spores with thin and colorless walls that appear green due to the presence of a chloroplast. In most species, there is a single cell inside the spore, and a slender extension of this cell called the germ tube germinates from the proximal side of the spore. The tip of the germ tube divides to form an octant (solid geometry) of cells, and the first rhizoid grows as an extension of the original germ cell. The tip continues to divide new cells, which produces a thalloid protonema. By contrast, species of the family Dendrocerotaceae may begin dividing within the spore, becoming multicellular and even photosynthetic before the spore germinates. In either case, the protonema is a transitory stage in the life of a hornwort.

Life cycle of a typical hornwort Phaeoceros

From the protonema grows the adult gametophyte, which is the persistent and independent stage in the life cycle. This stage usually grows as a thin rosette or ribbon-like thallus between one and five centimeters in diameter, and several layers of cells in thickness. It is green or yellow-green from the chlorophyll in its cells, or bluish-green when colonies of cyanobacteria grow inside the plant.

When the gametophyte has grown to its adult size, it produces the sex organs of the hornwort. Most plants are monoecious, with both sex organs on the same plant, but some plants (even within the same species) are dioecious, with separate male and female gametophytes. The female organs are known as archegonia (singular archegonium) and the male organs are known as antheridia (singular antheridium). Both kinds of organs develop just below the surface of the plant and are only later exposed by disintegration of the overlying cells.

The biflagellate sperm must swim from the antheridia, or else be splashed to the archegonia. When this happens, the sperm and egg cell fuse to form a zygote, the cell from which the sporophyte stage of the life cycle will develop. Unlike all other bryophytes, the first cell division of the zygote is longitudinal. Further divisions produce three basic regions of the sporophyte.

At the bottom of the sporophyte (closest to the interior of the gametophyte), is a foot. This is a globular group of cells that receives nutrients from the parent gametophyte, on which the sporophyte will spend its entire existence. In the middle of the sporophyte (just above the foot), is a meristem that will continue to divide and produce new cells for the third region. This third region is the capsule. Both the central and surface cells of the capsule are sterile, but between them is a layer of cells that will divide to produce pseudo-elaters and spores. These are released from the capsule when it splits lengthwise from the tip.

== Evolutionary history ==
While the fossil record of crown group hornworts only begins in the upper Cretaceous, the lower Devonian Horneophyton may represent a stem group to the clade, as it possesses a sporangium with central columella not attached at the roof. However, the same form of columella is also characteristic of basal moss groups, such as the Sphagnopsida and Andreaeopsida, and has been interpreted as a character common to all early land plants with stomata. The divergence between hornworts and Setaphyta (mosses and liverworts) is estimated to have occurred 479–450 million years ago, and the last common ancestor of present-day hornworts lived in middle Permian about 275 million years ago. Chromosome-scale genome sequencing of three hornwort species corroborates that stomata evolved only once during land plant evolution. It also shows that the three groups of bryophytes share a common ancestor that branched off from the other landplants early in evolution, and that liverworts and mosses are more closely related to each other than to hornworts. Unlike other land plants, the hornwort genome has the low-CO_{2} inducible B gene (LCIB), which is also found in some species of algae. Because the diffusion rate of carbon dioxide is 10,000-fold higher in air than in water, aquatic algae require a mechanism to concentrate CO_{2} in chloroplasts so as to allow the photosynthetic RuBisCo protein to function efficiently. LCIB is one component of this CO_{2}-concentrating mechanism.

== Classification ==
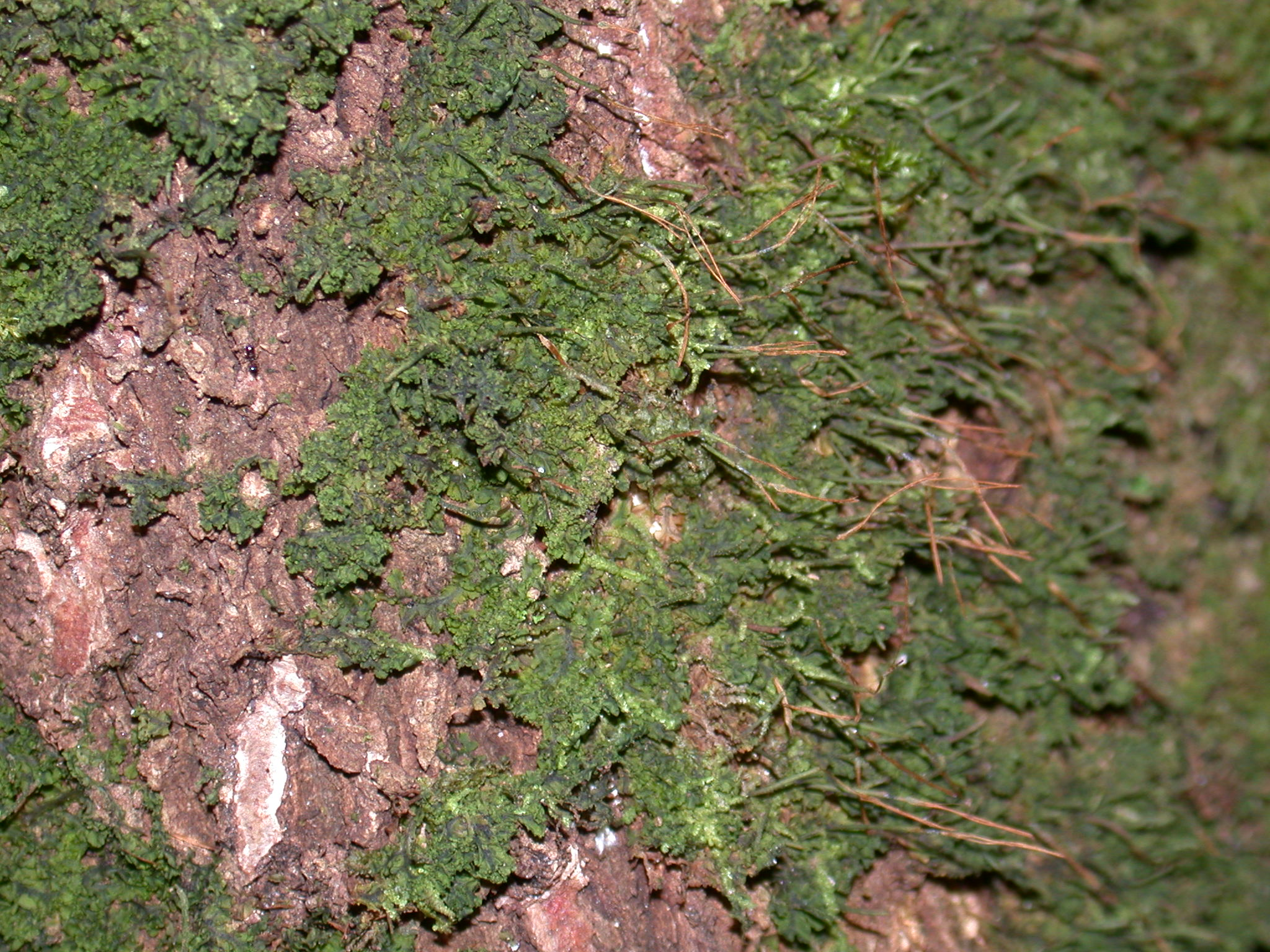
The hornwort Dendroceros crispus growing on the bark of a tree.

Hornworts were traditionally considered a class within the division Bryophyta (bryophytes). Later on, the bryophytes were considered paraphyletic, and hence the hornworts were given their own division, Anthocerotophyta (sometimes misspelled Anthocerophyta). However, the most recent phylogenetic evidence leans strongly towards bryophyte monophyly, and it has been proposed that hornworts are de-ranked to the original class Anthocerotopsida.

Traditionally, there was a single class of hornworts, called Anthocerotopsida, or older Anthocerotae. More recently, a second class Leiosporocertotopsida has been segregated for the singularly unusual species Leiosporoceros dussii. All other hornworts remain in the class Anthocerotopsida. These two classes are divided further into five orders, each containing a single family.

Among land plants, hornworts are one of the earliest-diverging lineages of the early land plant ancestors; cladistic analysis implies that the group originated prior to the Devonian, around the same time as the mosses and liverworts. There are about 200 species known, but new species are still being discovered. The number and names of genera are a current matter of investigation, and several competing classification schemes have been published since 1988.

Structural features that have been used in the classification of hornworts include: the anatomy of chloroplasts and their numbers within cells, the presence of a pyrenoid, the numbers of antheridia within androecia, and the arrangement of jacket cells of the antheridia.

=== Phylogeny ===
Recent studies of molecular, ultrastructural, and morphological data have yielded a new classification of hornworts.

Class Leiosporocerotopsida

Leiosporocerotales
- Leiosporocerotaceae
  - Leiosporoceros (1 species)

Class Anthocerotopsida

Anthocerotales
- Anthocerotaceae
  - Anthoceros (ca. 83 species)
  - Folioceros (17 species)
  - Sphaerosporoceros (2 species)

Notothyladales
- Notothyladaceae
  - Notothylas (21 species)
  - Phaeoceros (ca. 41 species)
  - Paraphymatoceros (1–2 species)
  - Hattorioceros (1 species)
  - Mesoceros (2 species)

Phymatocerotales
- Phymatocerotaceae
  - Phymatoceros (2 species)

Dendrocerotales
- Dendrocerotaceae
  - Dendroceros (43 species)
  - Megaceros (8 species)
  - Nothoceros (7 species)
  - Phaeomegaceros (7 species)

- - Leiosporocerotopsida
    - Leiosporocerotales
      - Leiosporocerotaceae
        Leiosporoceros
  - Anthocerotopsida
    - - Anthocerotales
        - Anthocerotaceae
          - Folioceros
          - - Sphaerosporoceros
            - Anthoceros
    - - - Notothyladales
          - Notothyladaceae
            - Notothylas
            - Phaeoceros
      - - Phymatocerotales Phymatocerotaceae
          - Phymatoceros
        - Dendrocerotales Dendrocerotaceae
          - Phaeomegacerotoideae
            Phaeomegaceros
          - Dendrocerotoideae
            - Nothoceros
            - - Megaceros
              - Dendroceros

The current phylogeny and composition of the Anthocerotophyta.

== See also ==
- Embryophyte
