= Rosmarinic acid =

Chemical compound found in a variety of plants

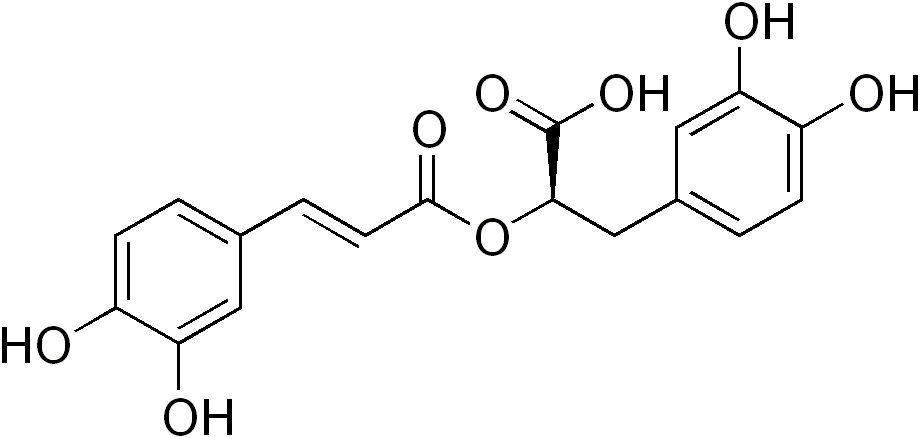
- Rosmarinic acid

Names
- Preferred IUPAC name (2R)-3-(3,4-Dihydroxyphenyl)-2-{[(2E)-3-(3,4-dihydroxyphenyl)prop-2-enoyl]oxy}propanoic acid

Identifiers
CAS Number	20283-92-5
3D model (JSmol)	Interactive image
ChEBI	CHEBI:17226
ChEMBL	ChEMBL324842
ChemSpider	4474888
ECHA InfoCard	100.123.507
KEGG	C01850
PubChem CID	5315615
UNII	MQE6XG29YI
CompTox Dashboard (EPA)	DTXSID20896987
- InChI: InChI=1S/C18H16O8/c19-12-4-1-10(7-14(12)21)3-6-17(23)26-16(18(24)25)9-11-2-5-13(20)15(22)8-11/h1-8,16,19-22H,9H2,(H,24,25)/b6-3+ Key: DOUMFZQKYFQNTF-ZZXKWVIFSA-N; InChI=1/C18H16O8/c19-12-4-1-10(7-14(12)21)3-6-17(23)26-16(18(24)25)9-11-2-5-13(20)15(22)8-11/h1-8,16,19-22H,9H2,(H,24,25)/b6-3+ Key: DOUMFZQKYFQNTF-ZZXKWVIFBW
- SMILES: O=C(O)C(OC(=O)\C=C\c1ccc(O)c(O)c1)Cc2cc(O)c(O)cc2

Properties
Chemical formula	C_{18}H_{16}O_{8}
Molar mass	360.318 g·mol^{−1}
Appearance	Red-orange powder
Melting point	171 to 175 °C (340 to 347 °F; 444 to 448 K)
Solubility in water	Slightly soluble
Solubility in other solvents	Well soluble in most organic solvents
- Except where otherwise noted, data are given for materials in their standard state (at 25 °C [77 °F], 100 kPa). verify (what is ?) Infobox references

Rosmarinic acid, named after rosemary (Salvia rosmarinus Spenn.), is a polyphenol constituent of many culinary herbs, including rosemary (Salvia rosmarinus L.), perilla (Perilla frutescens L.), sage (Salvia officinalis L.), mint (Mentha arvense L.), and basil (Ocimum basilicum L.).

== History ==
Rosmarinic acid was first isolated and characterized in 1958 by the Italian chemists Scarpatti and Oriente from rosemary (Salvia rosmarinus), after which the acid is named.

== Chemistry ==
Chemically, rosmarinic acid is a caffeic acid ester, with tyrosine providing another phenolic ring via dihydroxyphenyl-lactic acid. It has a molecular mass of 360 daltons.

== Natural occurrences ==
Rosmarinic acid accumulation is shown in hornworts, in the fern family Blechnaceae, and in species of several orders of mono- and dicotyledonous angiosperms.

It is found most notably in many Lamiaceae (dicotyledons in the order Lamiales), especially in the subfamily Nepetoideae. It is found in species used commonly as culinary herbs such as Ocimum basilicum (basil), Ocimum tenuiflorum (holy basil), Melissa officinalis (lemon balm), Salvia rosmarinus (rosemary), Origanum majorana (marjoram), Salvia officinalis (sage), thyme and peppermint. It is also found in plants in the family Marantaceae (monocotyledons in the order Zingiberales), such as species in the genera Maranta (Maranta leuconeura) and Thalia (Thalia geniculata).

Rosmarinic acid and the derivative rosmarinic acid 3′-O-β-D-glucoside can be found in Anthoceros agrestis, a hornwort (Anthocerotophyta).

== Metabolism ==
The biosynthesis of rosmarinic acid uses 4-coumaroyl-CoA from the general phenylpropanoid pathway as a hydroxycinnamoyl donor. The hydroxycinnamoyl acceptor substrate comes from the shikimate pathway: shikimic acid, quinic acid and 3,4-dihydroxyphenyllactic acid derived from L-tyrosine. Thus, chemically, rosmarinic acid is an ester of caffeic acid with 3,4-dihydroxyphenyllactic acid, but biologically, it is formed from 4-coumaroyl-4′-hydroxyphenyllactate. Rosmarinate synthase is an enzyme that uses caffeoyl-CoA and 3,4-dihydroxyphenyllactic acid to produce CoA and rosmarinate. Hydroxyphenylpyruvate reductase is also an enzyme involved in this biosynthesis.

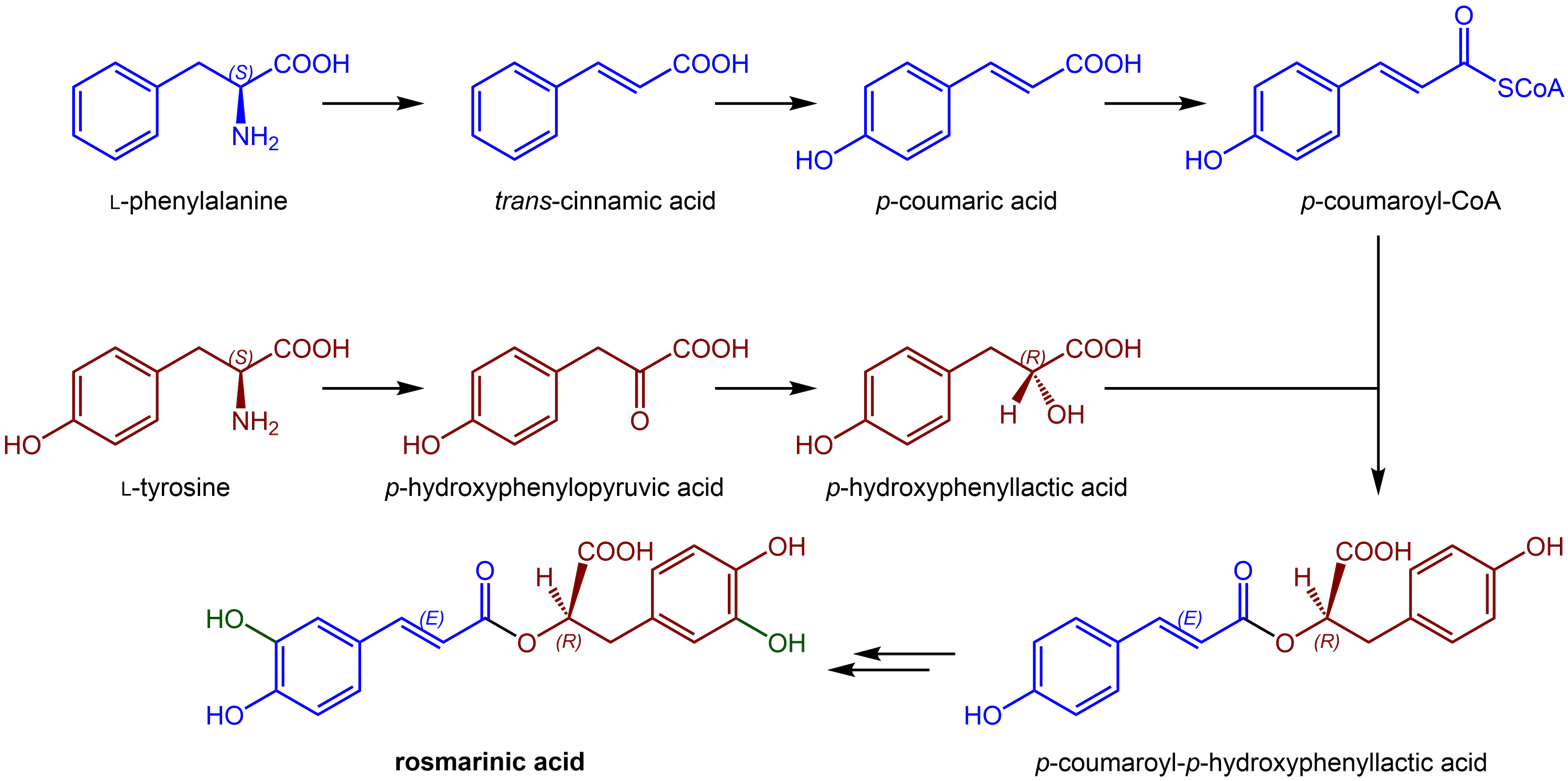

== Uses ==
When extracted from plant sources or synthesized in manufacturing, rosmarinic acid may be used in foods or beverages as a flavoring, in cosmetics, or as a dietary supplement.
