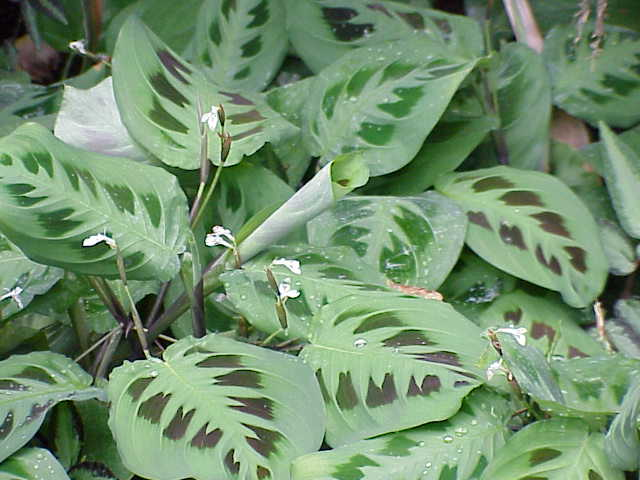
- Foliage and flowers of Maranta leuconeura var. kerchoveana

Scientific classification
- Kingdom: Plantae
- Clade: Embryophytes
- Clade: Tracheophytes
- Clade: Spermatophytes
- Clade: Angiosperms
- Clade: Monocots
- Clade: Commelinids
- Order: Zingiberales
- Family: Marantaceae
- Genus: Maranta
- Species: M. leuconeura

Binomial name
- Maranta leuconeura E.Morren

Synonyms
- Calathea leuconeura (E.Morren) G.Nicholson; Maranta massangeana E.Morren; Calathea kerchoveana (E.Morren) André; Maranta kerchoveana E.Morren; Maranta kerchovei Van Geert; Maranta leuconeura var. kerchoveana E.Morren; Maranta leuconeura var. massangeana (E.Morren) Planch; Calathea massangeana (E.Morren) G.Nicholson; Maranta massangeana atrata G.Nicholson; Maranta massangeana florentina G.Nicholson; Maranta massangeana metallica G.Nicholson; Maranta leuconeura var. erythroneura G.S.Bunting

= Maranta leuconeura =

Prayer plant

Species of flowering plant

Maranta leuconeura, widely known as the prayer plant due to its daily sunlight-dependent movements (which are said to resemble hands "in-prayer"), is a species of flowering plant in the family Marantaceae native to the Brazilian tropical forests. It is a variable, rhizomatous perennial, growing to 30 cm (12 in) tall and broad, with crowded clumps of evergreen, strikingly-marked oval leaves, each up to 12 cm (5 in) long. The plant spreads itself horizontally, carpeting an entire small area of forest floor, sending roots into the substrate at each leaf node.

Maranta, in-addition to fellow "prayer-plant" genera (like Calathea, Ctenanthe, Goeppertia and Stromanthe), is related to such groups as Alpinia, Ensete, Canna, Curcuma, Heliconia, Musa and Zingiber.

== Description ==
The specific epithet leuconeura means "white-veined", referring to the leaves. The leaves have a habit of lying flat during the day, and folding in an erect position at night as if in prayer for evening vespers, hence the common name "prayer plant". This behaviour is an example of a diurnal rhythm.

Small, white to purple flowers appear during the growing season, although this is not always observed in houseplants and the flowers may not be considered significant in comparison to the attractive foliage. The broad leaves of the plant are oval, two-color, greenish and fairly shiny. There are patches on both sides of the leaf medium, the color of which varies depending on the variety. The patches may be light green, green, brownish or dark gray. Medium color also varies by variety. The undersides of the leaves are variable, ranging from a light green, common in M. leuconeura var. kerchoveana, to a deep red, common in M. leuconeura var. erythroneura. Roots are shallow.

Flowers, although small, are interesting in that they have a trigger mechanism, closing the entrance to the flower quickly with a curling appendage, which both deposits and collects pollen in one motion, and only triggers once per flower, as for others in this plant family. Flowers open in the morning, one or two at a time per cassette, and wilt in the evening, falling off if not pollinated. Each capsule may contain ten or so flowers, so a capsule may last over a week with daily flowers. Each flower stalk has two capsules, one below the other.

== Cultivation ==
Maranta leuconeura var. erythroneura (prayer plant) "praying", i.e., raising its leaves for the evening

Maranta leuconeura is a well-known houseplant in temperate regions, requiring a minimum temperature of 15 °C (59 °F). As a plant that is native to rainforests, Maranta prefers bright indirect sunlight, high humidity, and well-drained soil that has a high humus content. Acidic, clay or loam soils are tolerable.

Direct sunlight should be avoided, as well as standing water. At daytime the ideal temperature is 21–27 °C and at night 16–21 °C; the night temperature should not be lower than 15 °C. Higher temperatures also require higher humidity, for example, just spraying. Due to the thin leaves of this species and their need for high humidity, prolonged dry and arid conditions as well as excessive sunlight can damage the plants.

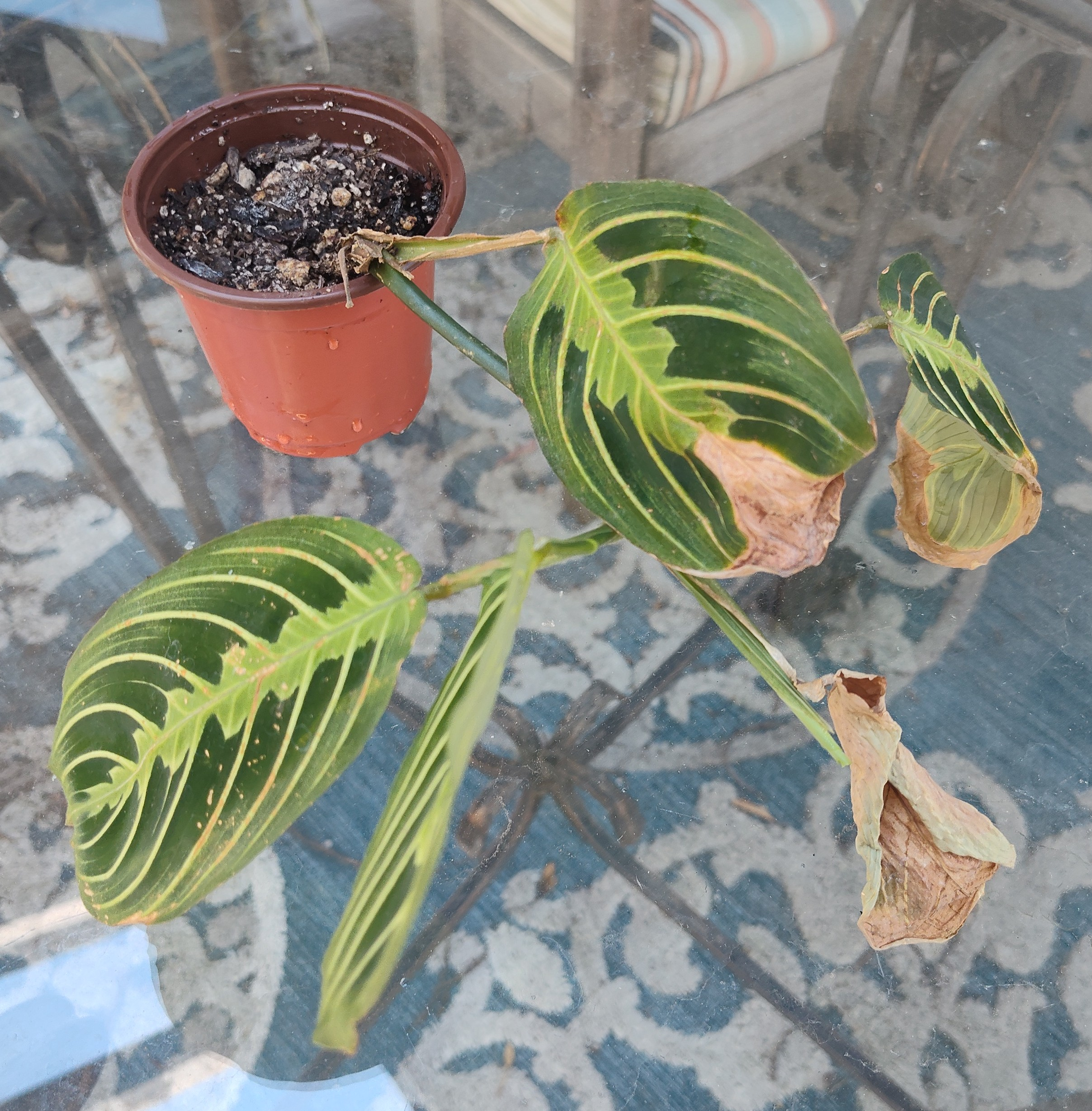
Lemon-Lime cultivar of the Maranta Leuconeura species, featuring necrosis at the margins.

During the growing season, spring and summer, Maranta houseplants require moist soil and fertilization every month. Slightly drier soils and reduced fertilizer application are recommended for the remainder of the year. In warmer climates, at USDA Zones 10b-11, it can be grown as groundcover in moist, shady areas.

=== Propagation ===
Spacing between plants should be between 60 and 90 cm (23.5 and 35.5 in) Propagation is achieved via division and cuttings. Cuttings, 10 cm in length with 3–4 leaves, should be taken in the spring. Bottom heat can be applied to the cuttings to promote rooting. Propagation by seed is possible although is less common. Seed germination is recommended at 13–18 °C (55–64 °F). Maranta leuconeura can also be propagated in vitro.

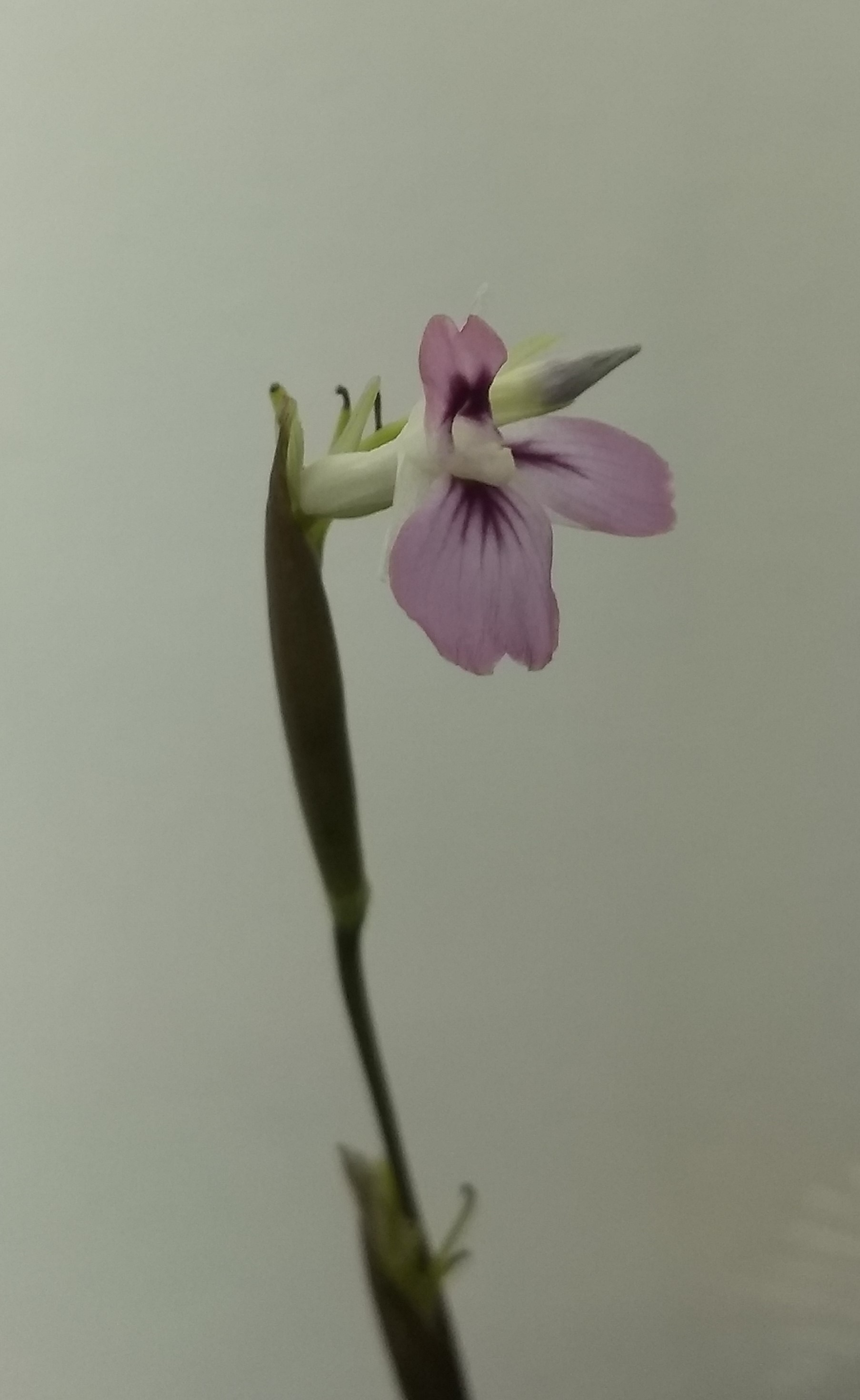
Unpollinated flower

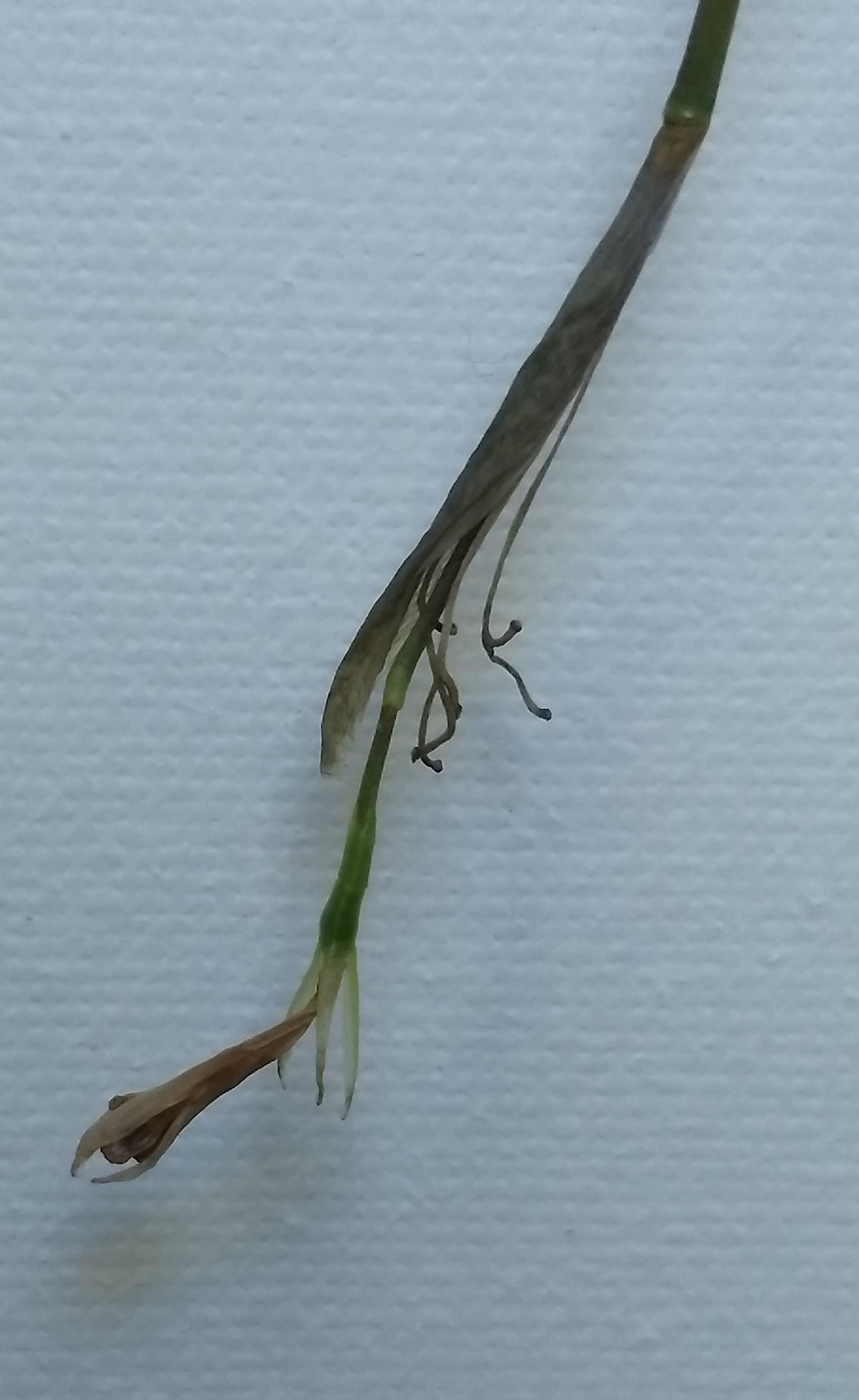
Early development of seed body after hand pollination, seen as a swelling at the base of the flower. The plant points the whole stalk downwards once all the flowers have been exhausted. Flowers drop off if not pollinated, and stalk dies if it contains no pollinated flowers.

=== Cultivars ===
Numerous cultivars have been produced.

=== Varieties ===
The following naturally occurring varieties (distinguishable from artificially selected cultivars) have gained the Royal Horticultural Society's Award of Garden Merit:-

- Maranta leuconeura var. kerchoveana (rabbit's foot), dark blotches between the leaf veins
- Maranta leuconeura var. erythroneura (herringbone plant); strong red veining on dark green leaves

== Common uses ==
M. leuconeura can be grown in planters, hanging baskets, mass planting, and as an edging plant. This plant is frequently used in shopping malls.

== Chemistry ==
Rosmarinic acid can be found in plants in the family Marantaceae such as Maranta leuconeura.

== Diseases ==
Maranta usually experiences minimal insect pest pressure, however, spider mites and mealybugs can be of significant concern. Leaf spot and cucumber mosaic virus are diseases that can occur. Root rot can occur in poorly drained soils.

== See also ==
- Fishbone prayer plant
