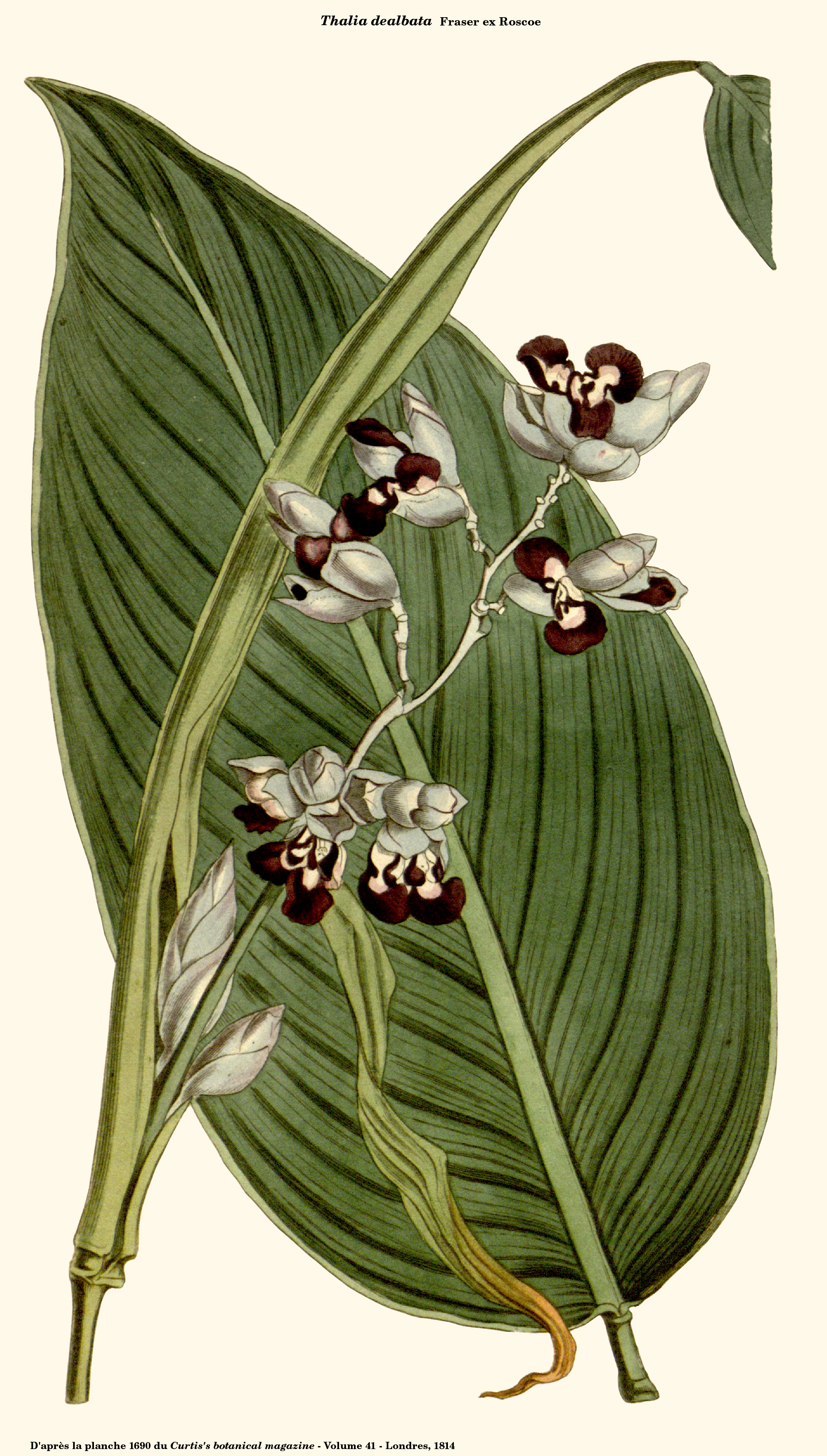
- Thalia dealbata Illustration by Sydenham Edwards in Curtis's Botanical Magazine, 1815

Scientific classification
- Kingdom: Plantae
- Clade: Tracheophytes
- Clade: Angiosperms
- Clade: Monocots
- Clade: Commelinids
- Order: Zingiberales
- Family: Marantaceae
- Genus: Thalia; L.

Synonyms
- Peronia Redouté; Malacarya Raf.; Spirostalis Raf.; Spirostylis Raf.

= Thalia (plant) =

Genus of aquatic plants

Thalia is a genus of flowering plants in the Marantaceae (prayer plant and arrowroot) family found mainly in aquatic, marshy and riparian zones in Eastern, Central and Western Africa—as far south as Zimbabwe—and the Americas, from Illinois in the north, through northern Argentina in the southern part of its range. These plants can (and prefer to) grow with their roots and rhizomes fully submerged and their foliage growing emersed from the water's surface. They thrive in floodplains, vernal pools and other seasonally-inundated areas, as well. Alligator-flag is a common name for plants in this genus. The generic name is in honor of Johannes Thal (1542–1583), a German doctor who wrote A Flora of the Harz Mountains.

== Cultivation ==
Semihardy in cultivation, it needs protection against frosts. It can be propagated by seed or division of the rootstock in the spring.

== Species ==
Species:

- Thalia dealbata Fraser - southeastern United States
- Thalia densibracteata Petersen - Brazil
- Thalia geniculata L. - Africa, Florida, Louisiana, tropical Americas
- Thalia multiflora Horkel ex Körn. - Argentina, Brazil, Uruguay
- Thalia pavonii Körn. - Ecuador
- Thalia petersiana K.Schum. in H.G.A.Engler (ed.) - Brazil
