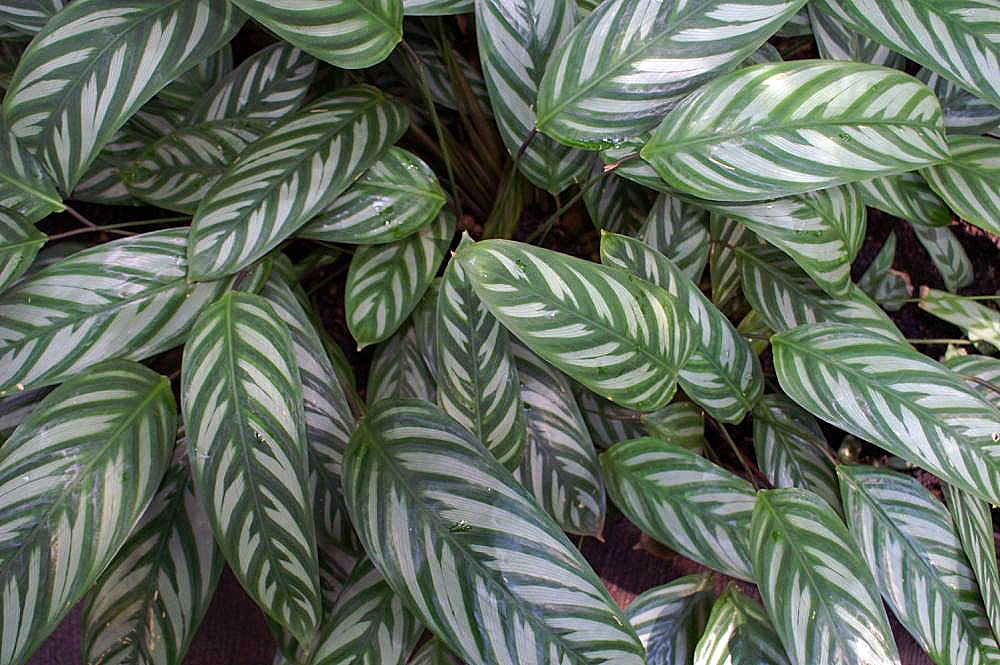

Scientific classification
- Kingdom: Plantae
- Clade: Tracheophytes
- Clade: Angiosperms
- Clade: Monocots
- Clade: Commelinids
- Order: Zingiberales
- Family: Marantaceae
- Genus: Ctenanthe
- Species: C. oppenheimiana

Binomial name
- Ctenanthe oppenheimiana (E.Morr) K.Schum

= Ctenanthe oppenheimiana =

Species of flowering plant

Ctenanthe oppenheimiana, the giant bamburanta or never-never plant, is a species of flowering plant of family Marantaceae and is a native of Brazil. It is an evergreen perennial. This plant can grow to more than 1 m (3.3 ft) tall and broad, with long narrow leaves up to 40 cm (16 in) in length. The leaves are adorned on the secondary veins with dark green bands, which meet and merge in the margins. In between are cream coloured bands. The undersides of the leaves have a red-ish colour. The cultivar 'Tricolor' is a common ornamental variety, which as a houseplant in the UK has gained the Royal Horticultural Society's Award of Garden Merit. (confirmed 2017). This cultivar is visually very similar to Stromanthe sanguinea 'Triostar', and the two are often confused. The difference between the two lies in the lack of regular banding on the leaves of the Stromanthe, and the generally more rounded shape of the leaves in Ctenanthe.

== Synonyms ==
- Calathea oppenheimiana E.Morren
- Maranta herderiana Regel
- Maranta oppenheimiana (E.Morren) Petersen
- Phyllodes oppenheimiana (E.Morren) Kuntze
