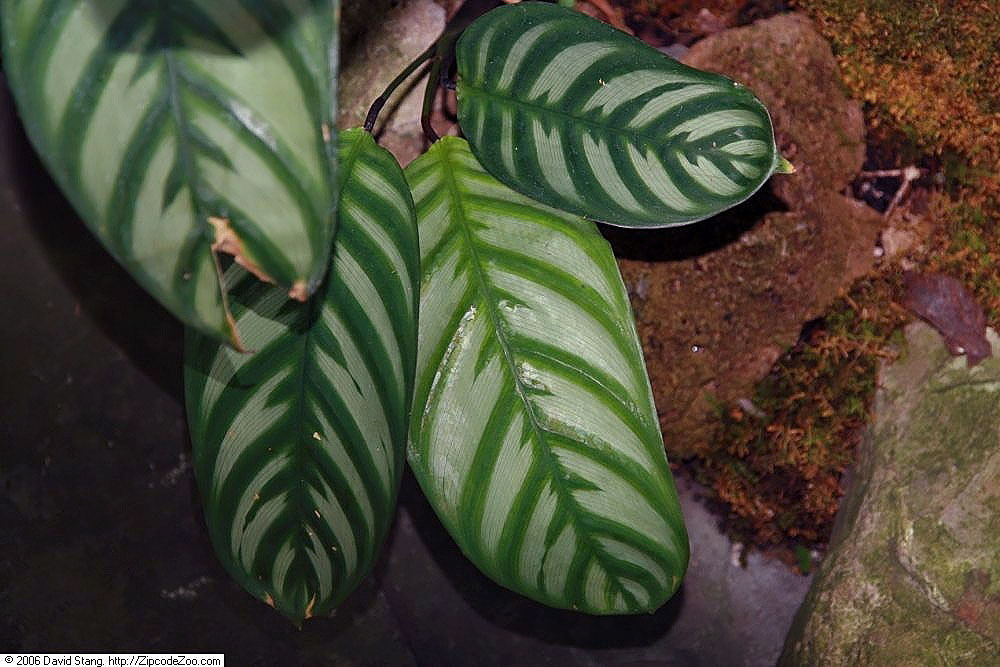
- Foliage

Scientific classification
- Kingdom: Plantae
- Clade: Embryophytes
- Clade: Tracheophytes
- Clade: Spermatophytes
- Clade: Angiosperms
- Clade: Monocots
- Clade: Commelinids
- Order: Zingiberales
- Family: Marantaceae
- Genus: Ctenanthe
- Species: C. amabilis

Binomial name
- Ctenanthe amabilis (É.Morren) H.Kenn. & Nicolson

Synonyms
- Stromanthe amabilis É.Morren

= Ctenanthe amabilis =

Species of flowering plant

Ctenanthe amabilis, called the beautiful ctenanthe, is a species of flowering plant in the genus Ctenanthe, likely native to Brazil, and introduced into Costa Rica. It has gained the Royal Horticultural Society's Award of Garden Merit as a subtropical hothouse ornamental.
