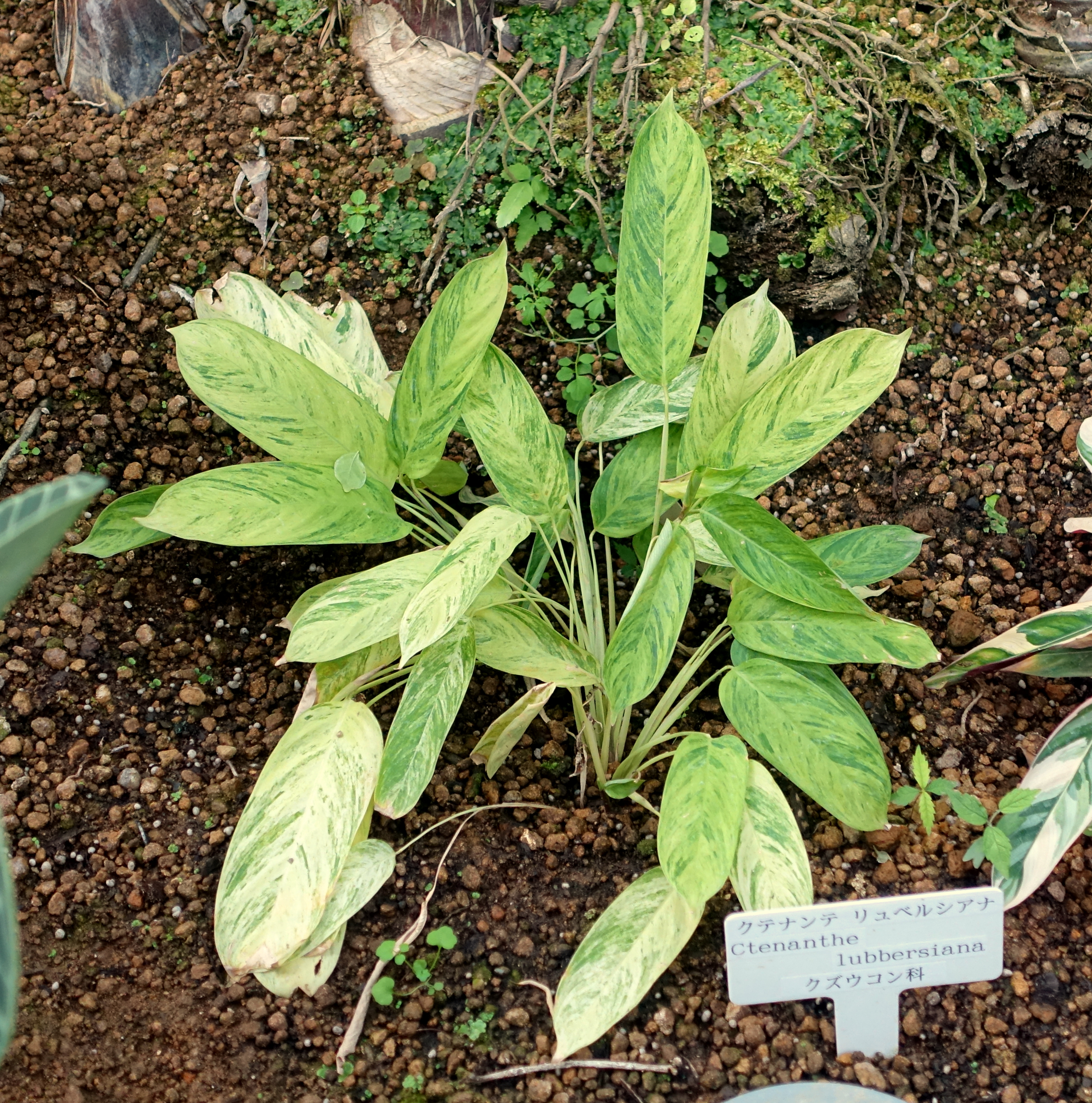
- At the Shinjuku Gyo-en Greenhouse

Scientific classification
- Kingdom: Plantae
- Clade: Embryophytes
- Clade: Tracheophytes
- Clade: Spermatophytes
- Clade: Angiosperms
- Clade: Monocots
- Clade: Commelinids
- Order: Zingiberales
- Family: Marantaceae
- Genus: Ctenanthe
- Species: C. lubbersiana

Binomial name
- Ctenanthe lubbersiana (É.Morren) Eichler ex Petersen

Synonyms
- Stromanthe lubbersiana É.Morren

= Ctenanthe lubbersiana =

Species of flowering plant

Ctenanthe lubbersiana, called the bamburanta, is a species of flowering plant in the genus Ctenanthe, native to Brazil. It has gained the Royal Horticultural Society's Award of Garden Merit as a subtropical hothouse ornamental.
