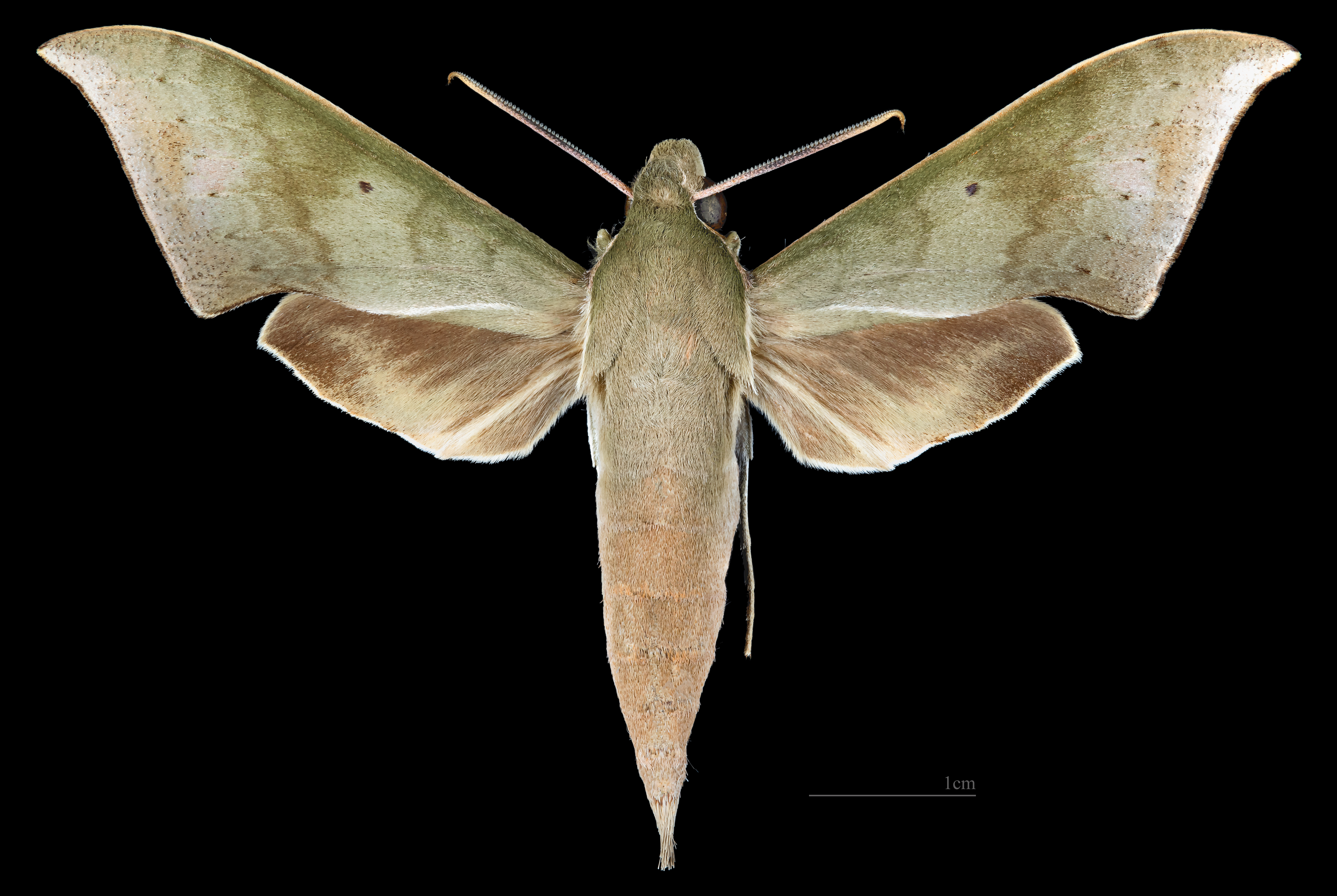
- Xylophanes hannemanni hannemanni Male dorsal
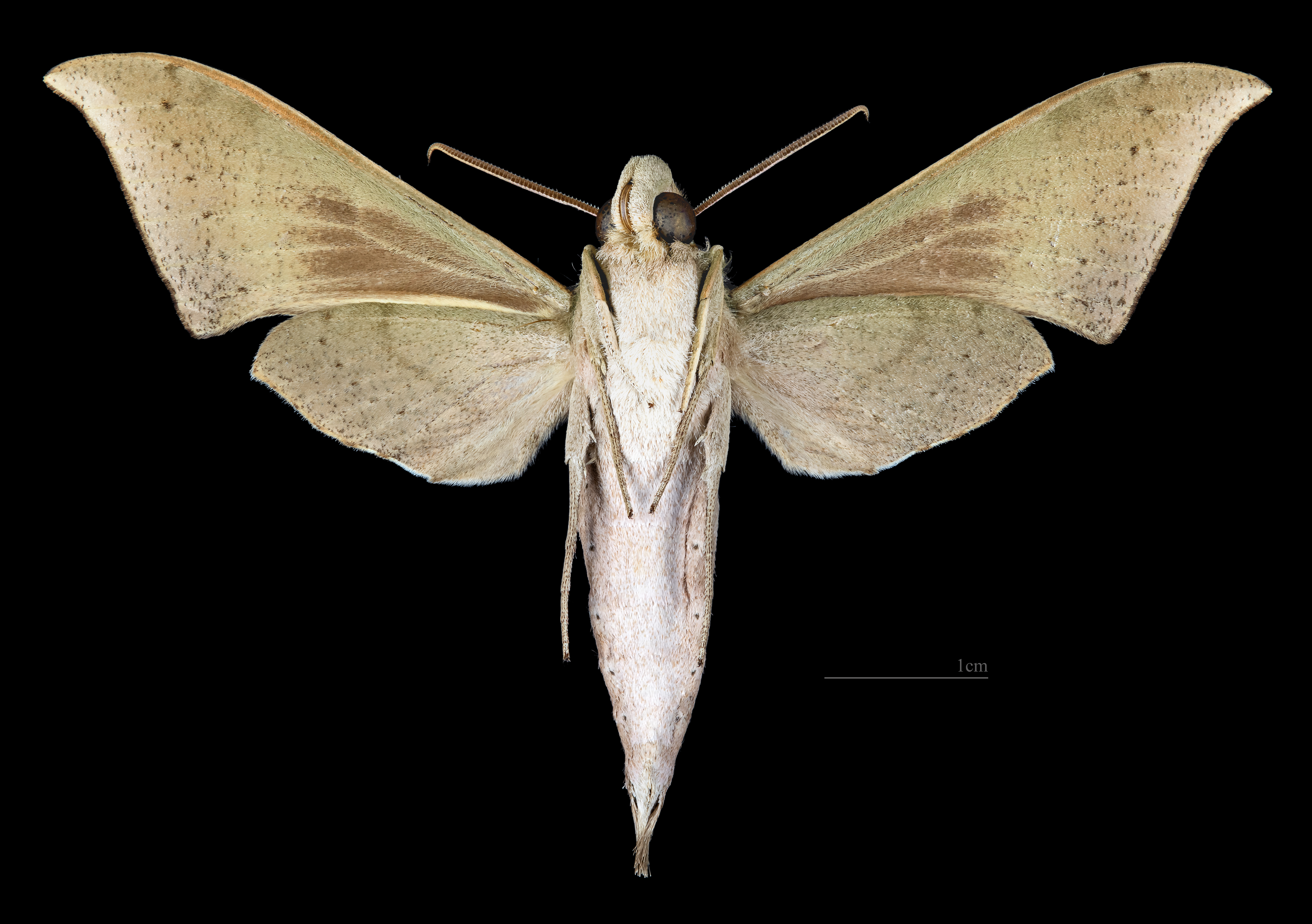
- Xylophanes hannemanni hannemanni Male ventral

Scientific classification
- Domain: Eukaryota
- Kingdom: Animalia
- Phylum: Arthropoda
- Class: Insecta
- Order: Lepidoptera
- Family: Sphingidae
- Genus: Xylophanes
- Species: X. hannemanni

Binomial name
- Xylophanes hannemanni Closs, 1917

Synonyms
- Xylophanes sericus Gehlen, 1940; Xylophanes hojeda Gehlen, 1928

= Xylophanes hannemanni =

Species of moth

Xylophanes hannemanni is a moth of the family Sphingidae. It is known from Mexico, Guatemala, Nicaragua, Costa Rica and Panama and further south through Ecuador to Peru and Bolivia.

The wingspan is 68–83 mm (2.7–3.3 in).

There are probably at least three generations per year. Adults have been recorded year round in Costa Rica.

The larvae possibly feed on Psychotria panamensis, Psychotria correae, Psychotria horizontalis, Psychotria eurycarpa, Psychotria elata and Psychotria nervosa, Palicourea padifolia, Coussarea austin-smithii and Thalia geniculata.

== Subspecies ==
- Xylophanes hannemanni hannemanni
- Xylophanes hannemanni pacifica Cadiou & Haxaire, 1997 (Pacific region of Mexico)
