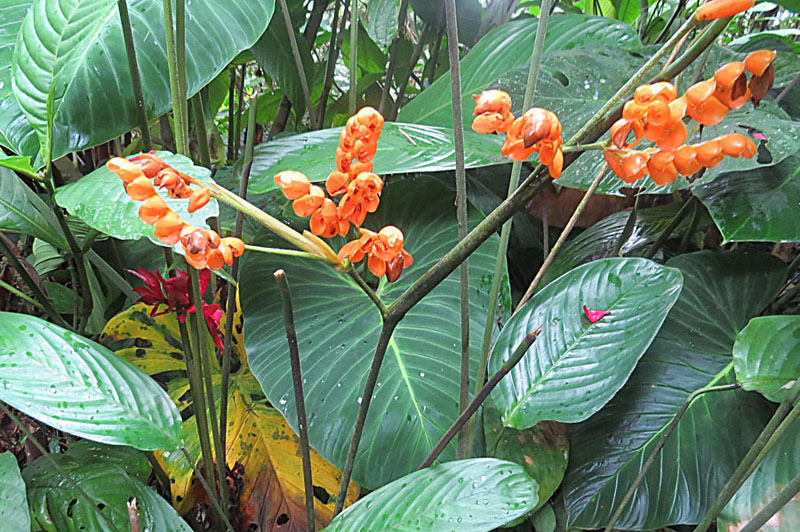

Scientific classification
- Kingdom: Plantae
- Clade: Tracheophytes
- Clade: Angiosperms
- Clade: Monocots
- Clade: Commelinids
- Order: Zingiberales
- Family: Marantaceae
- Genus: Stromanthe
- Species: S. stromanthoides

Binomial name
- Stromanthe stromanthoides (J.F.Macbr.) L.Andersson

Synonyms
- Myrosma stromanthoides J.F.Macbr.

= Stromanthe stromanthoides =

Species of flowering plant

Stromanthe stromanthoides is a species of plant in the family Marantaceae. It is native to Colombia, Ecuador, Peru, and northern Brazil. It was first described by James Francis Macbride, and given its current name by Bengt Lennart Andersson.

== Names ==
In Quechua spoken in Ecuador, Stromanthe stromanthoides is called llaki panga, which literally means 'loving leaves'. The plant is called soin kakie in Kofán and mihnan pehi in Capanahua. It is called pambu and bijao blanco in Shuar / Mestizo Spanish. In Colombia, it is known as joorỡ or tetera. In Shipibo, the plant is called ino becho, where ino means 'jaguar'. Another name for it is bijahhuillo.

== Uses ==
Stromanthe stromanthoides has been used medicinally for treating abscesses, diarrhea, and tumors. It is used in crafts and making hats. It is used as an ornamental, and for wrapping and roofing. The leaves are also used for traditional tea in some areas of Colombia.
