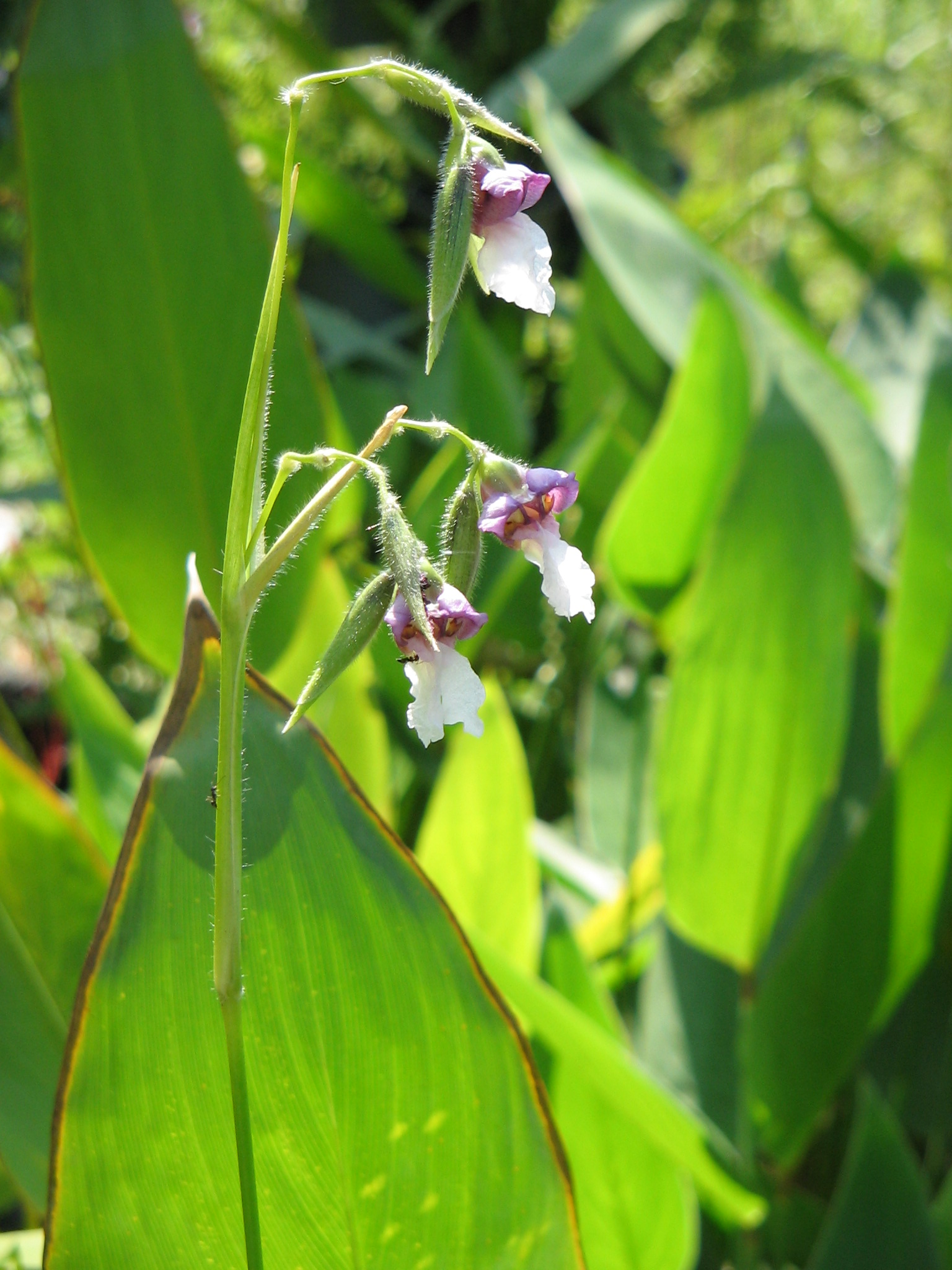

Conservation status
- Least Concern (IUCN 3.1)

Scientific classification
- Kingdom: Plantae
- Clade: Embryophytes
- Clade: Tracheophytes
- Clade: Angiosperms
- Clade: Monocots
- Clade: Commelinids
- Order: Zingiberales
- Family: Marantaceae
- Genus: Thalia
- Species: T. geniculata

Binomial name
- Thalia geniculata L., Sp. Pl., 2: 1193, 1753

Synonyms
- Maranta arundinacea Billb. ex Beurl. nom. illeg.; Maranta flexuosa C.Presl; Maranta geniculata (L.) Lam.; Renealmia erecta (Vell.) D.Dietr. nom. illeg.; Renealmia geniculata (L.) D.Dietr.; Thalia altissima Klotzsch. nom. inval.; Thalia angustifolia C.Wright ex Griseb.; Thalia caerulea Ridl.; Thalia dipetala Gagnep.; Thalia divaricata Chapm.; Thalia erecta Vell.; Thalia schumanniana De Wild.; Thalia trichocalyx Gagnep.; Thalia welwitschii Ridl.

= Thalia geniculata =

Plant species in Africa and the Americas

Thalia geniculata, the bent alligator-flag, arrowroot, or fire-flag, is a plant species widespread across tropical Africa and much of the Americas.

Thalia geniculata is native to a large region in Africa, from Senegal in the west to Sudan in the east, south to Zimbabwe and Angola. It is also considered native to Mexico, Central America, the West Indies, most of South America, as well as the southeastern United States (Puerto Rico, Florida, Louisiana, Alabama and southern Georgia).

== Ecology ==
The larvae of Stolidoptera tachasara, Xylophanes hannemanni and Sphenarches anisodactylus have been recorded feeding on Thalia geniculata. The Thalia geniculata was also use to investigate the sugar-feeding behavior of Anopheles quadrimaculatus by measuring the impact and its survival(7)

== Chemistry ==
Rosmarinic acid can be found in plants in the family Marantaceae such as Thalia geniculata.
