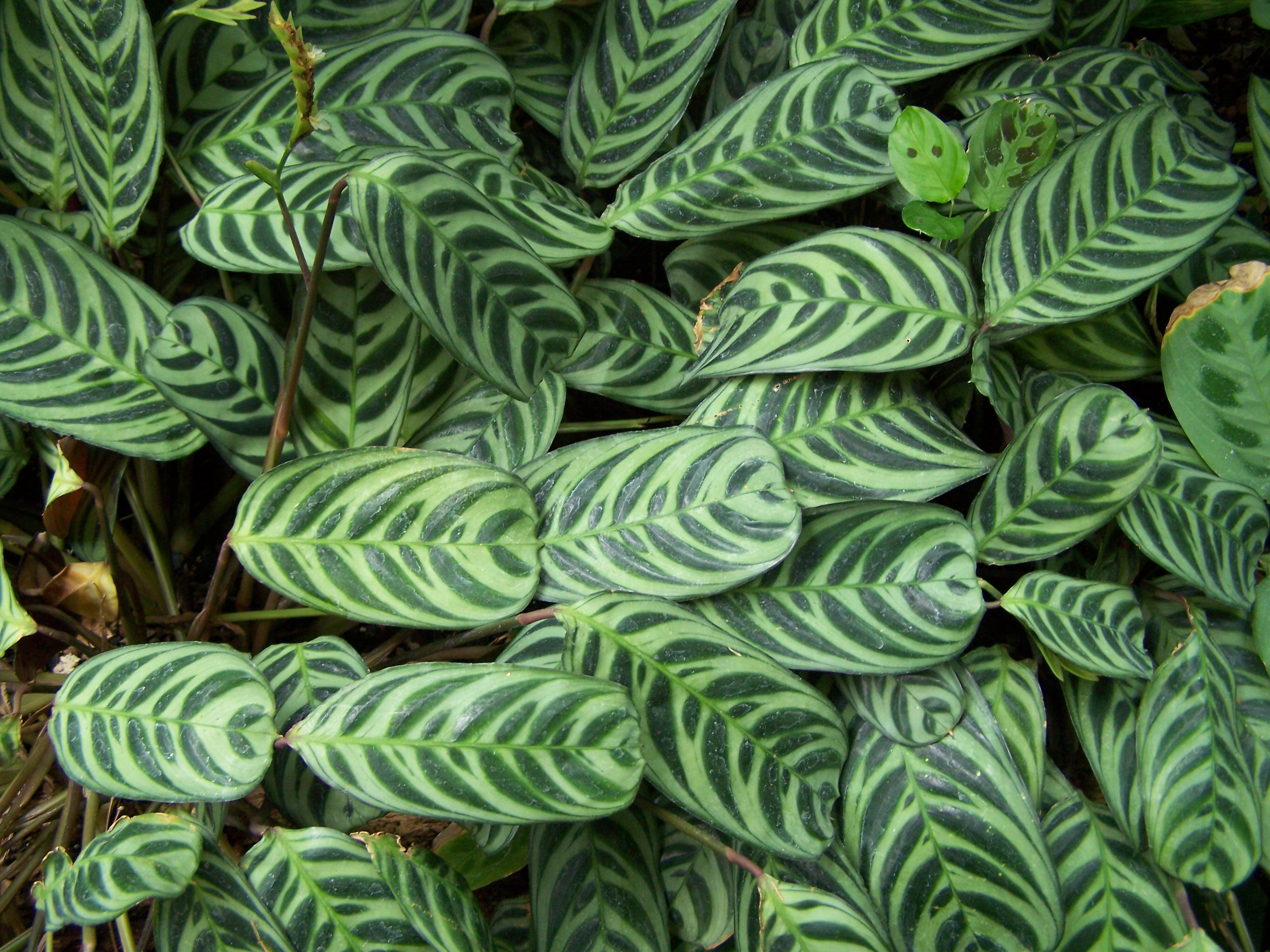
- Ctenanthe burle-marxii in Botanischer Garten Erlangen

Scientific classification
- Kingdom: Plantae
- Clade: Tracheophytes
- Clade: Angiosperms
- Clade: Monocots
- Clade: Commelinids
- Order: Zingiberales
- Family: Marantaceae
- Genus: Ctenanthe
- Species: C. burle-marxii

Binomial name
- Ctenanthe burle-marxii H.Kenn.

= Ctenanthe burle-marxii =

Species of flowering plant

Ctenanthe burle-marxii, commonly known as the fishbone prayer plant, is a species of plant in the genus Ctenanthe native to Brazil. Its common name derives from the alternating pattern of stripes on its oval, pale green leaves, while its scientific name is honor of landscape architect Roberto Burle Marx. Similar to other plants in the family Marantaceae, it also has a propensity to close up its leaves at night, which is why it is also called a "prayer plant" like Maranta leuconeura. It grows well as a form of tropical ground cover, often in shade.
