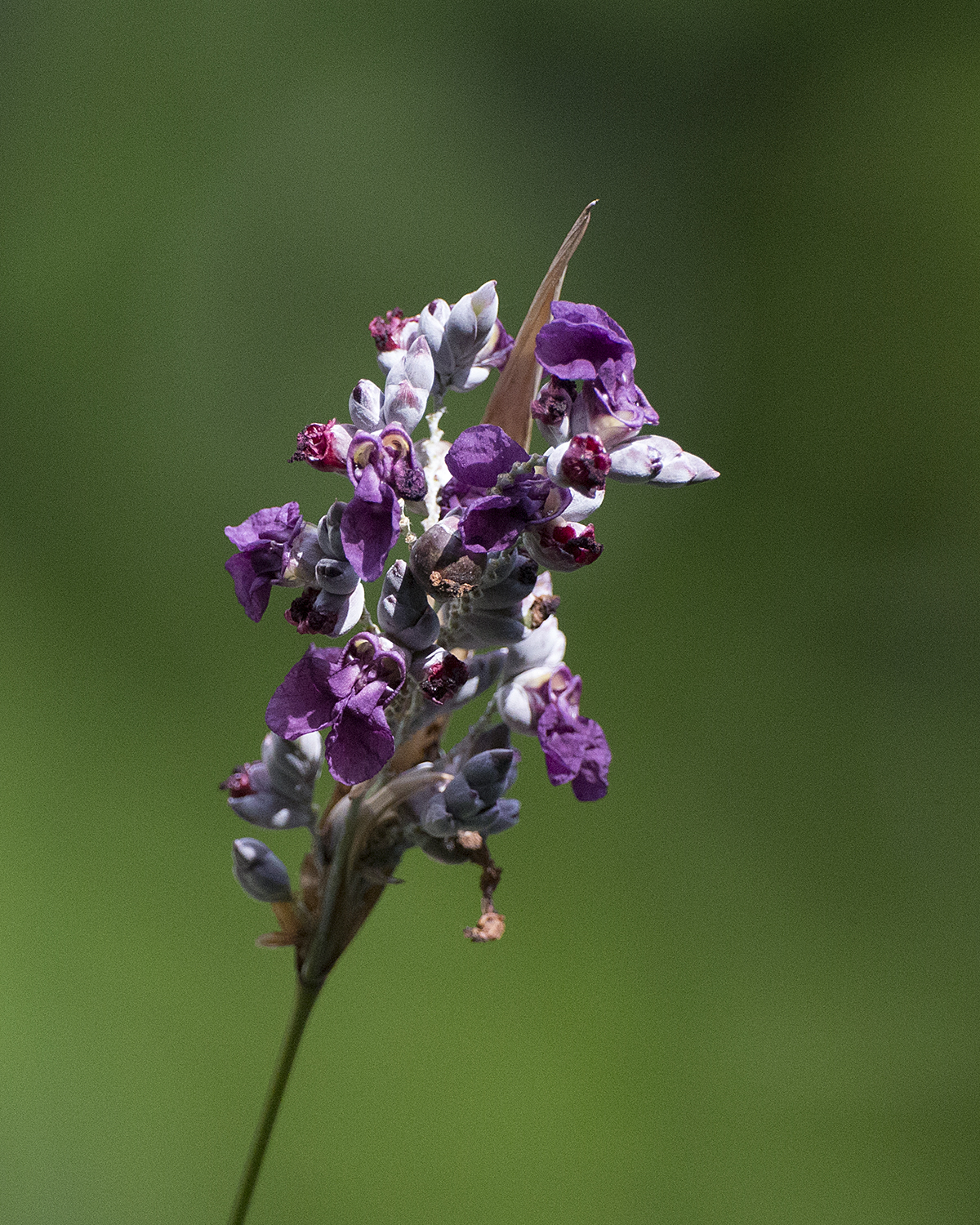

Conservation status
- Apparently Secure (NatureServe)

Scientific classification
- Kingdom: Plantae
- Clade: Tracheophytes
- Clade: Angiosperms
- Clade: Monocots
- Clade: Commelinids
- Order: Zingiberales
- Family: Marantaceae
- Genus: Thalia
- Species: T. dealbata

Binomial name
- Thalia dealbata Fraser ex Roscoe

Synonyms
- Malacarya dealbata (Fraser) Raf.; Maranta dealbata (Fraser) A.Dietr.; Peronia stricta F.Delaroche; Spirostalis biflora Raf.; Spirostylis biflora Raf.; Thalia barbata Small

= Thalia dealbata =

Species of aquatic plant

Thalia dealbata, the powdery alligator-flag, hardy canna, or powdery thalia, is an aquatic plant in the family Marantaceae, native to swamps, ponds and other wetlands in the southern and central United States. Its range includes much of Coastal Plains and the lower Mississippi Valley (States of South Carolina, Georgia, Alabama, Mississippi, Louisiana, Texas, Oklahoma, Arkansas, Missouri, Illinois and Kentucky). The plant has been grown as an aquatic ornamental because of the pretty violet flowers, and in cultivation has been proved hardy as far north as Philadelphia (Pennsylvania) and Vancouver (British Columbia).

Thalia dealbata grows to 6 ft (1.8 m), with small violet flowers on an 8 in (20 cm) panicle held above the foliage. The blue-green leaves are ovate to lanceolate, dusted with white powder and with purple edges.

== Gallery ==
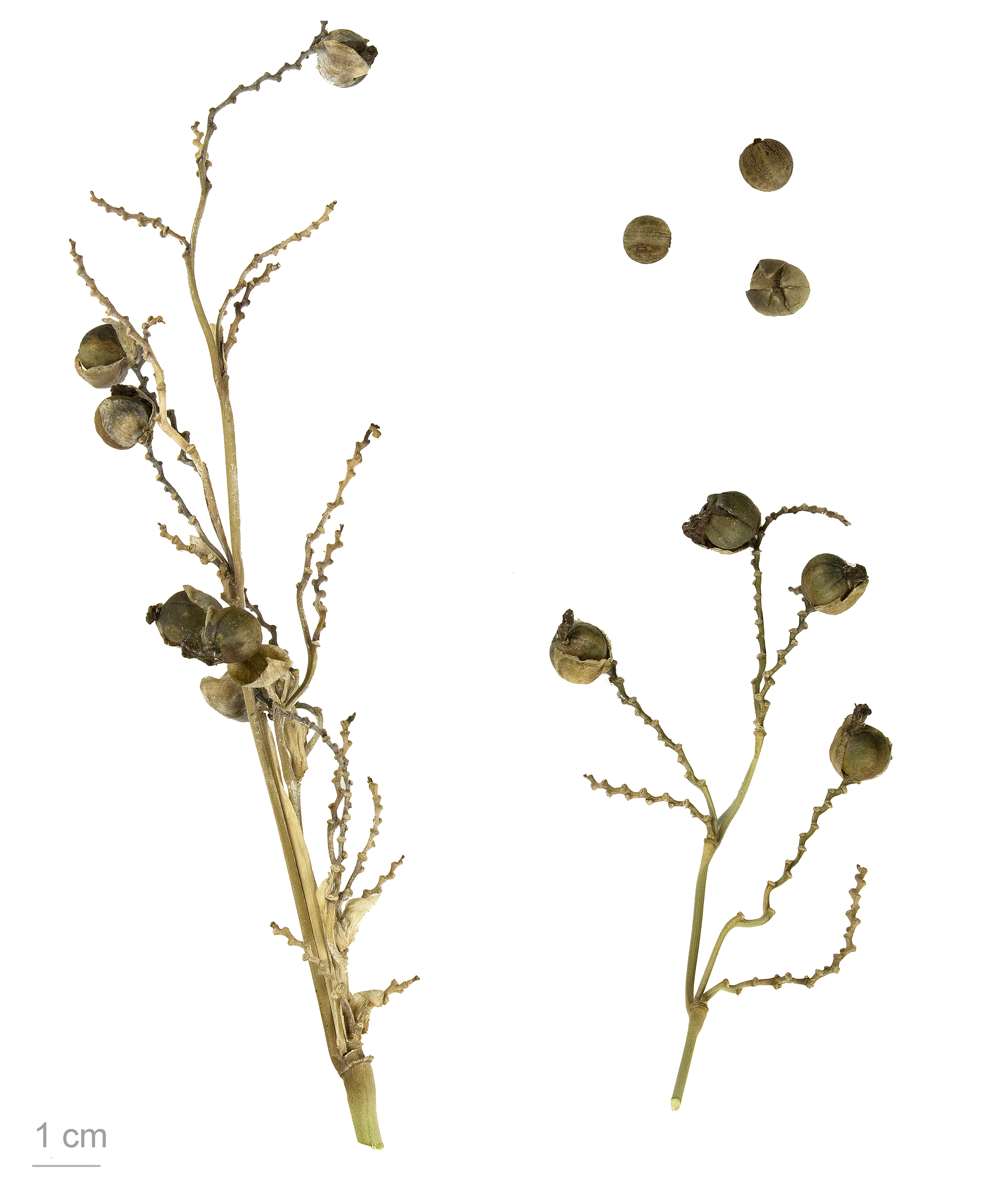
Thalia dealbata
MHNT

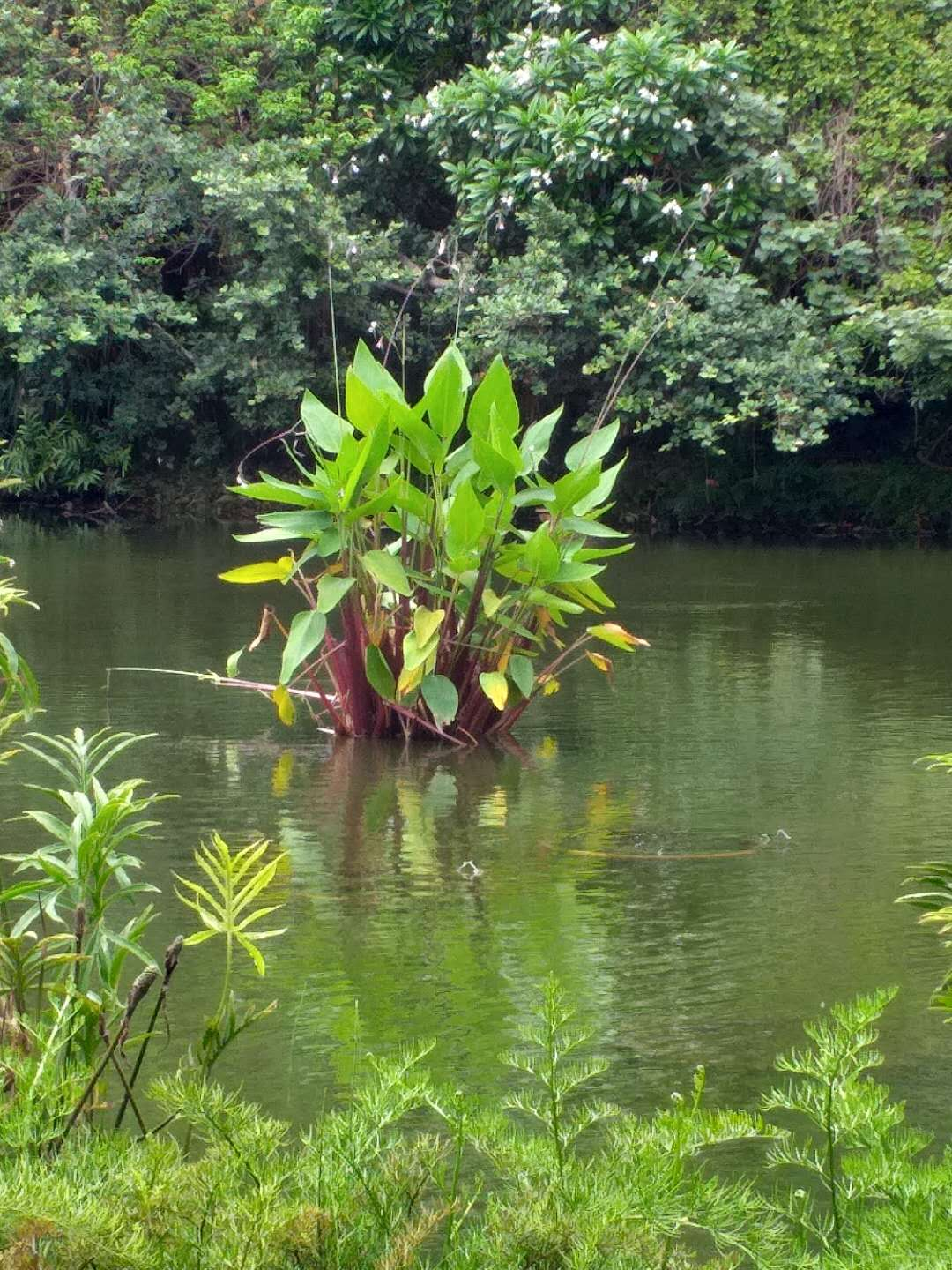
Thalia dealbata
