= Stromanthe ramosissima =

Conservation status
- Vulnerable (IUCN 3.1)

Scientific classification
- Kingdom: Plantae
- Clade: Tracheophytes
- Clade: Angiosperms
- Clade: Monocots
- Clade: Commelinids
- Order: Zingiberales
- Family: Marantaceae
- Genus: Stromanthe
- Species: S. ramosissima

Binomial name
- Stromanthe ramosissima L.Andersson

Species of flowering plant

Stromanthe ramosissima is a species of plant in the Marantaceae family. It is endemic to Ecuador. Its natural habitat is subtropical or tropical moist montane forests.

In Ecuador, Stromanthe ramosissima is used to make fans for winnowing.
