= Maranta gibba =

Scientific classification
- Kingdom: Plantae
- Clade: Tracheophytes
- Clade: Angiosperms
- Clade: Monocots
- Clade: Commelinids
- Order: Zingiberales
- Family: Marantaceae
- Genus: Maranta
- Species: M. gibba

Binomial name
- Maranta gibba Sm. in A.Rees

Synonyms
- Maranta pubescens Klotzsch in M.R.Schomburgk; Maranta divaricata f. major K.Schum.

Species of plant

Maranta gibba is a plant species native to Mexico (Campeche, Chiapas, Jalisco, Morelos, Oaxaca, Quintana Roo, Puebla, San Luis Potosí, Veracruz, Yucatán), Central America, northern South America (Brazil, Peru, Colombia, Venezuela, Guyana, French Guiana, Suriname), and the Island of Trinidad. It is reportedly naturalized in the Lesser Antilles.

Maranta gibba is a shrubby perennial with ovate leaves. Flowers are borne in panicles. Fruits are gibbous. Plant was originally described from specimens grown in a garden on Barbados and shipped from there to Liverpool.
