= Thalia pavonii =

Conservation status
- Vulnerable (IUCN 3.1)

Scientific classification
- Kingdom: Plantae
- Clade: Tracheophytes
- Clade: Angiosperms
- Clade: Monocots
- Clade: Commelinids
- Order: Zingiberales
- Family: Marantaceae
- Genus: Thalia
- Species: T. pavonii

Binomial name
- Thalia pavonii Körn.

Species of flowering plant

Thalia pavonii is a species of plant in the Marantaceae family. It is endemic to Ecuador. Its natural habitat is subtropical or tropical dry forests.
