= Rosmarinate synthase =

Class of enzymes

rosmarinate synthase

Identifiers
- EC no.: 2.3.1.140
- CAS no.: 117590-80-4

Databases
- IntEnz: IntEnz view
- BRENDA: BRENDA entry
- ExPASy: NiceZyme view
- KEGG: KEGG entry
- MetaCyc: metabolic pathway
- PRIAM: profile
- PDB structures: RCSB PDB PDBe PDBsum
- Gene Ontology: AmiGO / QuickGO
Search
- PMC: articles
- PubMed: articles
- NCBI: proteins

In enzymology, a rosmarinate synthase (EC 2.3.1.140) is an enzyme that catalyzes the chemical reaction

caffeoyl-CoA + 3-(3,4-dihydroxyphenyl)lactate $\rightleftharpoons$ CoA + rosmarinate

Thus, the two substrates of this enzyme are caffeoyl-CoA and 3-(3,4-dihydroxyphenyl)lactate, whereas its two products are CoA and rosmarinate.

This enzyme belongs to the family of transferases, specifically those acyltransferases transferring groups other than aminoacyl groups. The systematic name of this enzyme class is caffeoyl-CoA:3-(3,4-dihydroxyphenyl)lactate 2'-O-caffeoyl-transferase. Other names in common use include rosmarinic acid synthase, caffeoyl-coenzyme A:3,4-dihydroxyphenyllactic acid, caffeoyltransferase, and 4-coumaroyl-CoA:4-hydroxyphenyllactic acid 4-coumaroyl transferase. This enzyme participates in tyrosine metabolism.
