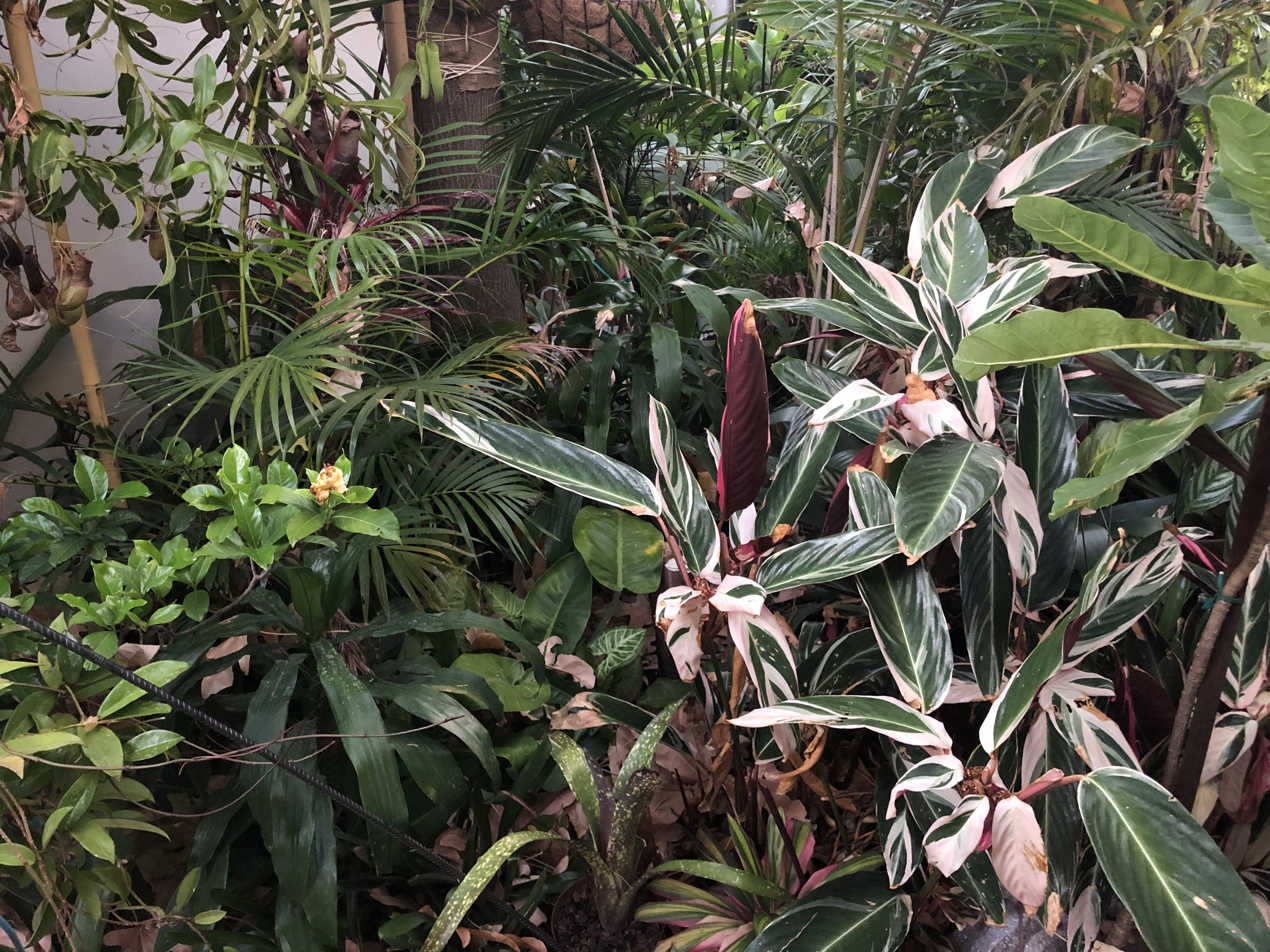
- Stromanthe sanguinea 'Triostar'

Scientific classification
- Kingdom: Plantae
- Clade: Tracheophytes
- Clade: Angiosperms
- Clade: Monocots
- Clade: Commelinids
- Order: Zingiberales
- Family: Marantaceae
- Genus: Stromanthe
- Species: S. thalia

Binomial name
- Stromanthe thalia (Vell.) J.M.A.Braga

= Stromanthe thalia =

Species of flowering plant

Stromanthe thalia is a plant species in the arrowroot family Marantaceae, native to the Brazilian rainforest. It is also known by the synonym Stromanthe sanguinea.

It is a common houseplant in temperate climates, valued for its striking variegated leaves with purple undersides. It can grow outside in a humid tropical climate, but needs light shade in the afternoon and must be protected from high winds.

The soil should be kept moist at all times, but never waterlogged as the plant is susceptible to root rot.

Hummingbirds and bees are the main pollinators.

Under ideal growing conditions, Stromanthe sanguinea will reach 4–6 ft (1.2–1.8 m) tall in about a year after emerging from its rhizome. Propagation can be from either seeds or rhizome division, but it is faster and more reliable to take rhizome cuttings.

The Latin specific epithet sanguinea means “blood-red.

Stromanthe sanguinea has received the Royal Horticultural Society's Award of Garden Merit.

== Gallery ==
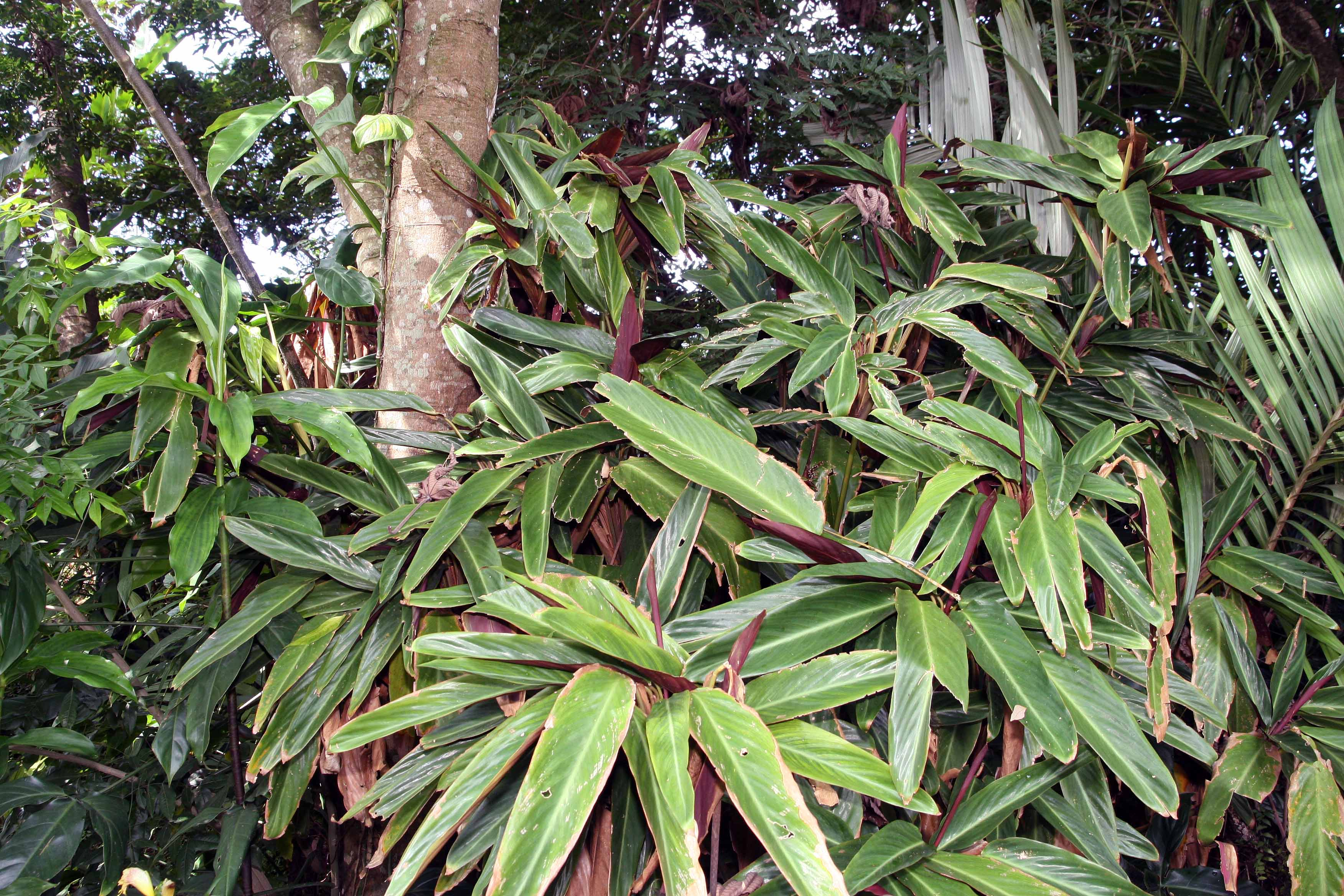
Else Kientzler Botanical Garden, Sarchi Norte, Costa Rica

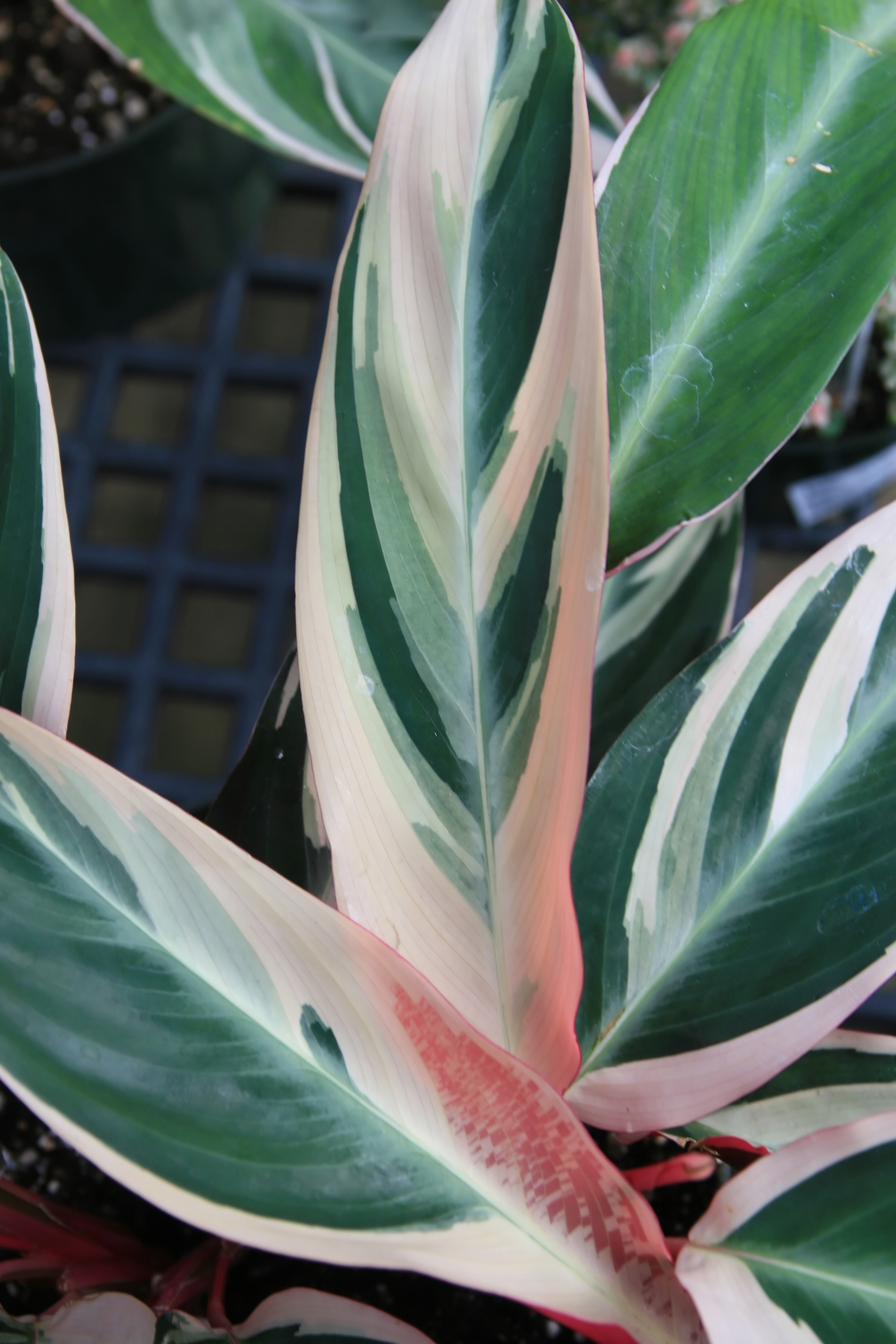
Behnke Nurseries, Beltsville, MD USA

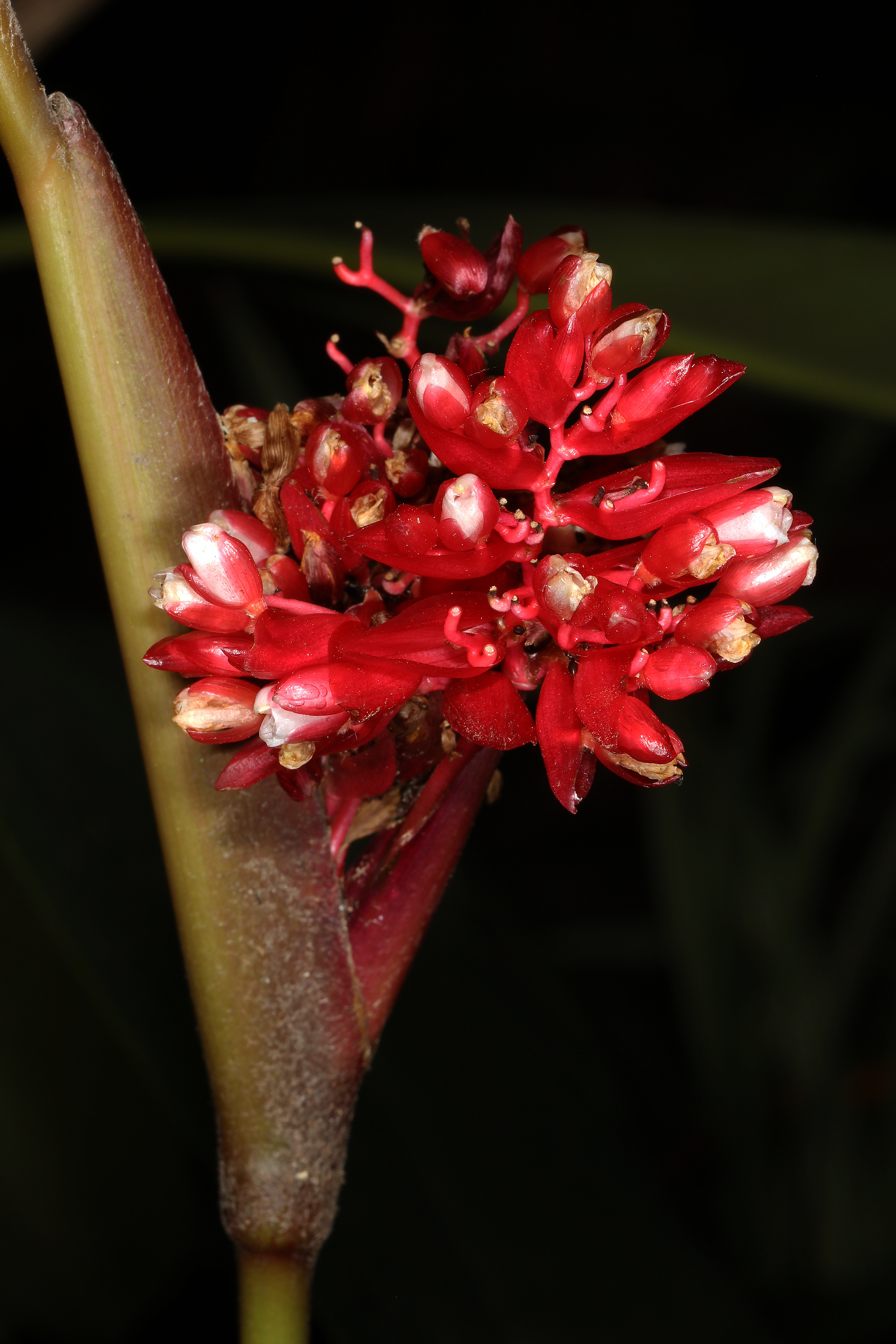
Durban Botanic Gardens, Durban
