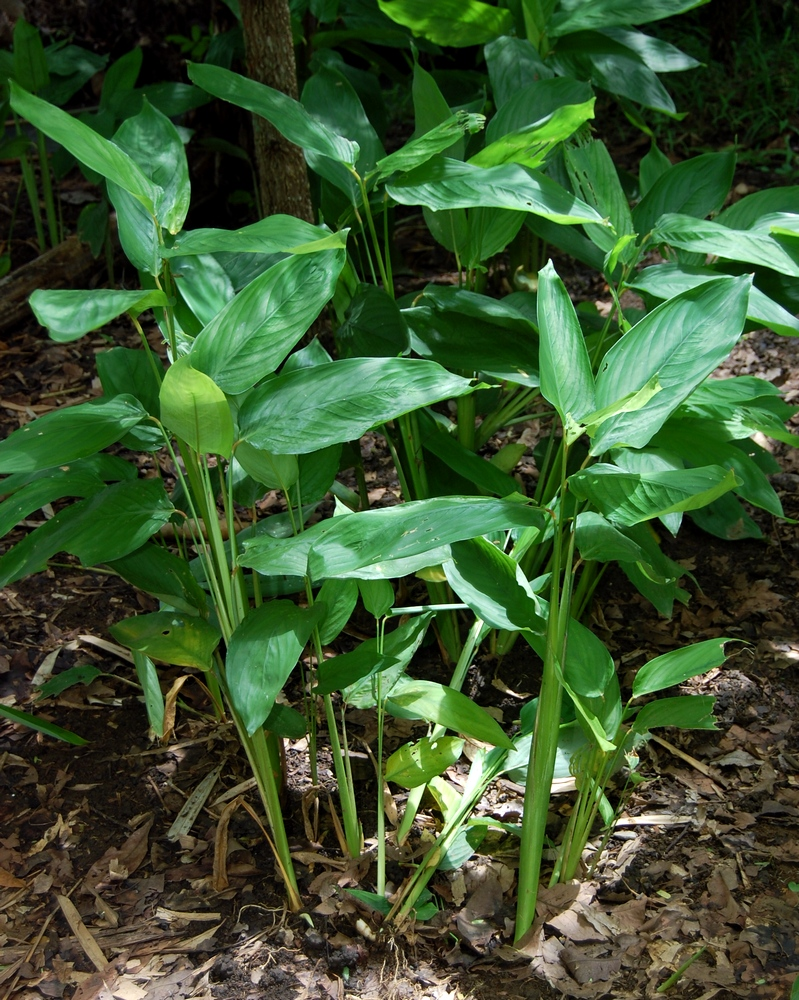

Scientific classification
- Kingdom: Plantae
- Clade: Tracheophytes
- Clade: Angiosperms
- Clade: Monocots
- Clade: Commelinids
- Order: Zingiberales
- Family: Marantaceae
- Genus: Maranta
- Species: M. arundinacea

Binomial name
- Maranta arundinacea L.

Synonyms
- Maranta indica Tussac; Maranta minor Chantrier ex André; Maranta ramosissima Wall.; Maranta sylvatica Roscoe ex Sm.

= Maranta arundinacea =

Arrowroot

Species of plant

Arrowroot, raw
Nutritional value per 100 g (3.5 oz)
- Energy: 271 kJ (65 kcal)
- Carbohydrates: 13.39 g
- Dietary fiber: 1.3 g
- Fat: 0.2 g
- Protein: 4.24 g
Vitamins and minerals
Vitamins	Quantity %DV^{†}
Thiamine (B1)	12% 0.143 mg
Riboflavin (B2)	5% 0.059 mg
Niacin (B3)	11% 1.693 mg
Pantothenic acid (B5)	6% 0.292 mg
Vitamin B6	16% 0.266 mg
Folate (B9)	85% 338 μg
Minerals	Quantity %DV^{†}
Iron	12% 2.22 mg
Magnesium	6% 25 mg
Manganese	8% 0.174 mg
Phosphorus	8% 98 mg
Potassium	15% 454 mg
Zinc	6% 0.63 mg
- Link to USDA Database entry
- ^{†}Percentages estimated using US recommendations for adults, except for potassium, which is estimated based on expert recommendation from the National Academies.

Maranta arundinacea, also known as arrowroot, maranta, West Indian arrowroot, obedience plant or Bermuda arrowroot is a large, perennial herb found in rainforest habitats of the Americas, but cultivated in tropical regions worldwide.

== Description ==
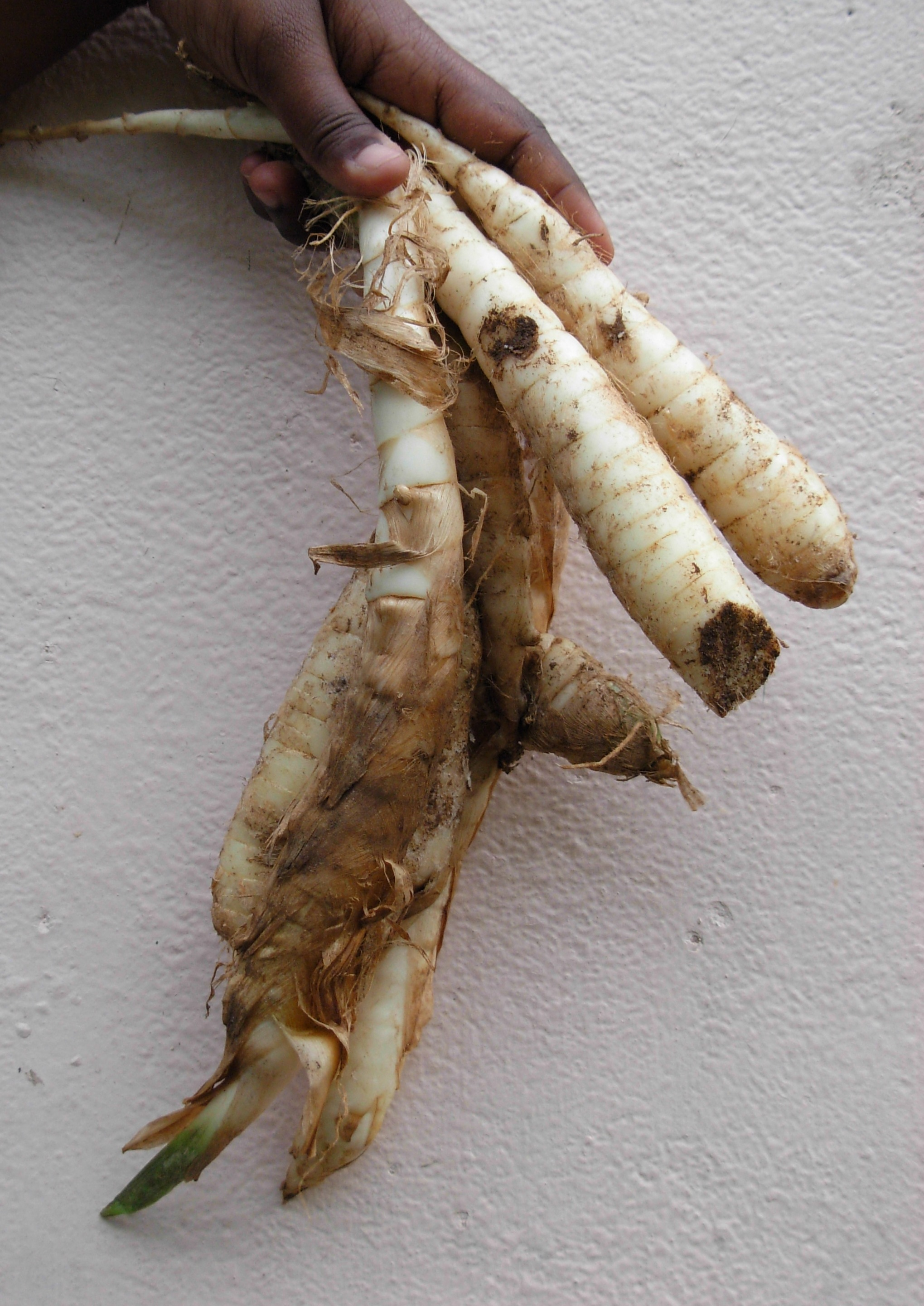
The root of M. arundinacea.

Arrowroot is a perennial plant growing to a height of between 0.3 m (1 ft) and 1.5 m (5 ft). Its leaves are lanceolate. The edible part of the plant is the rhizome. Twin clusters of small white flowers bloom about 90 days after planting. The plant rarely produces seeds and reproduction is typically by planting part of a rhizome with a bud. Rhizomes are ready for harvesting 10–12 months after planting as the leaves of the plant begin to wilt and die. The rhizomes are fleshy, cylindrical, and grow from 20 cm (8 in) to 45 cm (18 in) long.

The arrowroot plant probably originated in the Amazon rainforest of northwestern Brazil and neighboring countries. It grows best between temperatures of 23 °C (73 °F) and 29 °C (84 °F) with annual precipitation between 150 cm (59 in) and 200 cm (79 in). The dormant rhizomes can withstand temperatures as low as 5 °C (41 °F).

In the continental United States, arrowroot is cultivated as an outside plant only in southern Florida.

== Distribution ==
Maranta arundinacea is native to Mexico, Central America, the West Indies (Cuba, Hispaniola, Puerto Rico, and most of the Lesser Antilles) and South America (in Brazil, Peru, Ecuador, Colombia, Venezuela, Suriname, Guyana, and French Guiana). It is widely cultivated in many warm countries and is considered naturalized in The Bahamas, Bermuda, Cambodia, China (Guangdong, Guangxi, Hainan, Yunnan), the Cook Islands, Equatorial Guinea, Gabon, India, Indonesia, Jamaica, Japan (in the Volcano Islands), Mauritius, the Netherlands Antilles, Réunion, Samoa, Sri Lanka, Taiwan, Trinidad and Tobago, Tonga, the United States (Florida), the Philippines and Vanuatu.

The Caribbean island nation of St. Vincent and the Grenadines is the world's largest grower of arrowroot and producer of arrowroot flour. In Kerala, India, arrowroot, locally called ബിലാത്തി കൂവ (Bilathi Kūva), is cultivated to produce an easily digestible starch., while in Odisha, India, it's called ପାଳୁଅ (Paḷua).

== Prehistoric domestication ==
Radio-carbon dating has established that M. arundinacea was one of the first plants domesticated in prehistoric South America. Arrowroot, along with leren (Goeppertia allouia), squash (Cucurbita moschata), and bottle gourd (Lagenaria siceraria) became cultivated plants in northern South American and Panama between 8200 BC and 5600 BC. Some archaeologists believe that arrowroot was first used by indigenous peoples not as food but as a poultice to extract poison from wounds caused by spears or arrows.

Evidence of the use of arrowroot as food has been found dating from 8200 BC at the San Isidro archaeological site in the upper Cauca River valley of Colombia near the city of Popayán. Starch grains from arrowroot were found on grinding tools. It is unclear whether the arrowroot had been gathered or grown, although the elevation of the site of 1,700 metres (5,600 ft) is probably outside the normal range of elevations at which M. arundinacea grows in the wild. Thus, the plant may have been introduced at San Isidro from nearby lowland rainforest areas in a pioneering effort to cultivate it. Stone hoes for the cultivation of plants have been found which date as old as 7700 BCE in the middle Cauca valley, 150 kilometres (93 mi) north of San Isidro.

Domestication of arrowroot at these early dates was probably on a small scale with gardens of only a few plants being planted in alluvial soils near streams to ensure the steady supply of moisture needed during the growing season of arrowroot and other similar root crops. The exploitation of arrowroot was probably complicated by the difficulty of extracting the starch from the fibrous roots. The roots must first be pounded or ground then soaked in water to separate the starch from the fibers. The starch is excellent for digestibility.

== Uses ==
Currently, arrowroot starch is used in food preparations and confectionery, and for industrial applications such as cosmetics and glue. The residue of starch extraction has a high fibre content and can be fed to livestock.

== Gallery ==
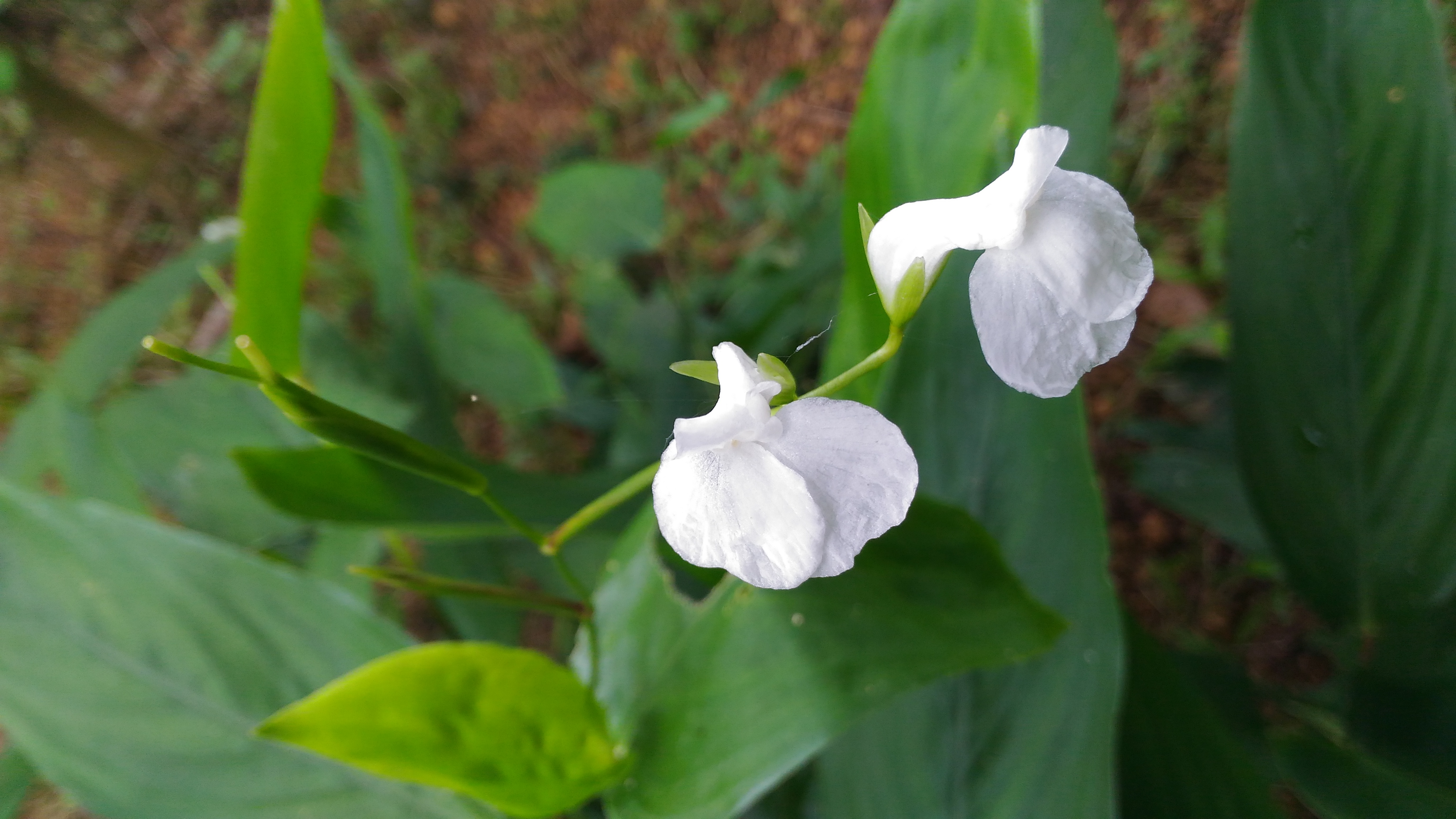
Arrowroot flower
