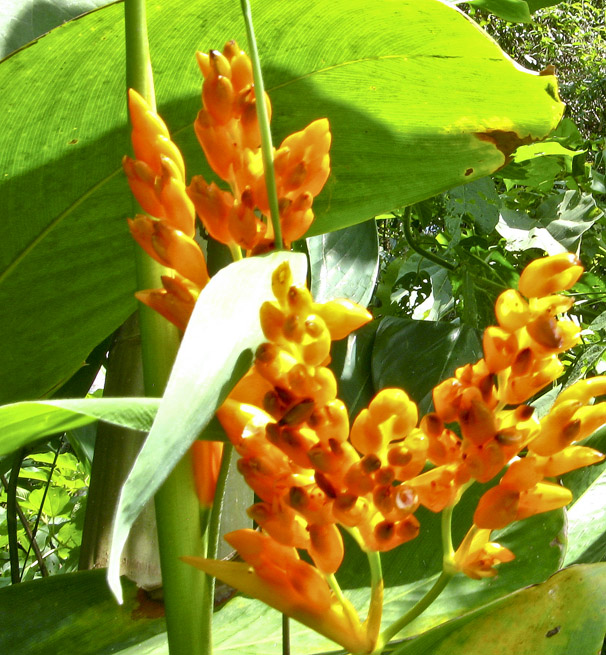
- Stromanthe lutea

Scientific classification
- Kingdom: Plantae
- Clade: Tracheophytes
- Clade: Angiosperms
- Clade: Monocots
- Clade: Commelinids
- Order: Zingiberales
- Family: Marantaceae
- Genus: Stromanthe; Sond.

Synonyms
- Marantopsis Körn.; Kerchovea Joriss.

= Stromanthe =

Genus of flowering plants

Stromanthe is a genus of flowering plants in the family Marantaceae, native to the tropical portions of the Americas from Mexico to Trinidad to northern Argentina.

Species

- Stromanthe angustifolia - Bolivia
- Stromanthe bahiensis - Bahia
- Stromanthe boliviana - Bolivia, NW Argentina
- Stromanthe confusa - Bolivia
- Stromanthe glabra - E + S Brazil
- Stromanthe guapilesensis - Costa Rica
- Stromanthe hjalmarssonii - Belize, Guatemala, Honduras, Nicaragua
- Stromanthe idroboi - Colombia, Venezuela
- Stromanthe jacquinii - Nicaragua, Panama, Colombia, Venezuela, Ecuador
- Stromanthe macrochlamys - S Mexico, Central America, Colombia
- Stromanthe palustris - Costa Rica
- Stromanthe papillosa - SE + S Brazil
- Stromanthe popolucana - Veracruz
- Stromanthe porteana - E Brazil
- Stromanthe ramosissima - Ecuador
- Stromanthe sanguinea - Brazilian and Peruvian Amazon (synonym of S. thalia)
- Stromanthe schottiana - E + SE Brazil
- Stromanthe sellowiana - Bahia, Rio de Janeiro
- Stromanthe stromanthoides - Colombia, Peru, Ecuador, Acre
- Stromanthe thalia - SE Brazil
- Stromanthe tonckat - Trinidad, much of tropical Central + South America
