= Hydroxyphenylpyruvate reductase =

hydroxyphenylpyruvate reductase

Identifiers
- EC no.: 1.1.1.237
- CAS no.: 117590-77-9

Databases
- IntEnz: IntEnz view
- BRENDA: BRENDA entry
- ExPASy: NiceZyme view
- KEGG: KEGG entry
- MetaCyc: metabolic pathway
- PRIAM: profile
- PDB structures: RCSB PDB PDBe PDBsum
- Gene Ontology: AmiGO / QuickGO
Search
- PMC: articles
- PubMed: articles
- NCBI: proteins

In enzymology, a hydroxyphenylpyruvate reductase (EC 1.1.1.237) is an enzyme that catalyzes the chemical reaction

3-(4-hydroxyphenyl)lactate + NAD^{+} $\rightleftharpoons$ 3-(4-hydroxyphenyl)pyruvate + NADH + H^{+}

Thus, the two substrates of this enzyme are 3-(4-hydroxyphenyl)lactate and NAD^{+}, whereas its 3 products are 3-(4-hydroxyphenyl)pyruvate, NADH, and H^{+}.

This enzyme belongs to the family of oxidoreductases, specifically those acting on the CH-OH group of donor with NAD^{+} or NADP^{+} as acceptor. The systematic name of this enzyme class is 4-hydroxyphenyllactate:NAD^{+} oxidoreductase. This enzyme is also called HPRP. This enzyme participates in tyrosine metabolism and phenylalanine metabolism.
