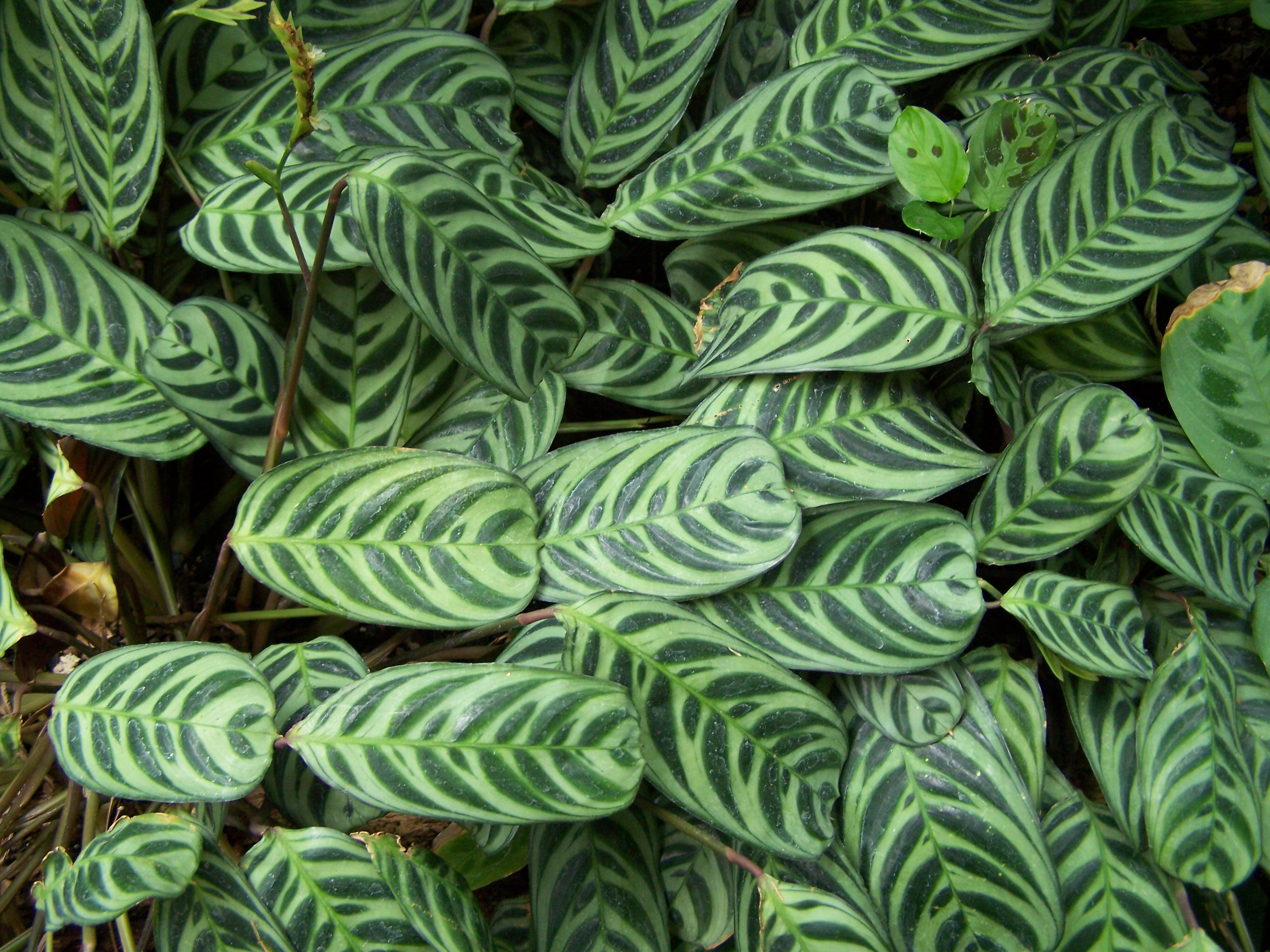
- Ctenanthe burle-marxii

Scientific classification
- Kingdom: Plantae
- Clade: Tracheophytes
- Clade: Angiosperms
- Clade: Monocots
- Clade: Commelinids
- Order: Zingiberales
- Family: Marantaceae
- Genus: Ctenanthe; Eichler

= Ctenanthe =

Genus of flowering plants

Ctenanthe is a genus of flowering plants of the family Marantaceae described as a genus in 1884. They are evergreen perennials, native to Central and South America (primarily Brazil). They are grown for their attractive, often variegated foliage. They are frost tender, requiring a minimum temperature of 13 °C (55 °F).

== Species ==
The genus has the following species:

- Ctenanthe amabilis - Brazil
- Ctenanthe amphiandina - Ecuador, Peru, NW Brazil, Colombia, Bolivia
- Ctenanthe burle-marxii - Espírito Santo
- Ctenanthe casupoides - E + S Brazil, Misiones
- Ctenanthe compressa - Venezuela, Brazil
- Ctenanthe dasycarpa - Costa Rica, Panama, Colombia
- Ctenanthe ericae - SE Colombia, Ecuador, Acre, Rondônia
- Ctenanthe glabra - Brazil
- Ctenanthe kummerana - Rio de Janeiro
- Ctenanthe lanceolata - S + SE Brazil
- Ctenanthe lubbersiana - Minas Gerais, Santa Catarina
- Ctenanthe marantifolia - SE Brazil
- Ctenanthe muelleri - S + SE Brazil
- Ctenanthe oppenheimiana - Bahia
- Ctenanthe setosa - S + E Brazil

== Awards ==
The Royal Horticultural Society's Award of Garden Merit has been awarded to the following:

- Ctenanthe amabilis
- Ctenanthe lubbersiana (common name: bamburanta), which grows to 2 m (7 ft) and bears large, oval leaves up to 30 cm (12 in) long, heavily striped and mottled with yellow
- Ctenanthe oppenheimiana 'Tricolor' (common name "never-never plant"), which grows to 2 m (7 ft) with narrow, oval leaves up to 40 cm (16 in) long with V-shaped silver patterns above and maroon below.
