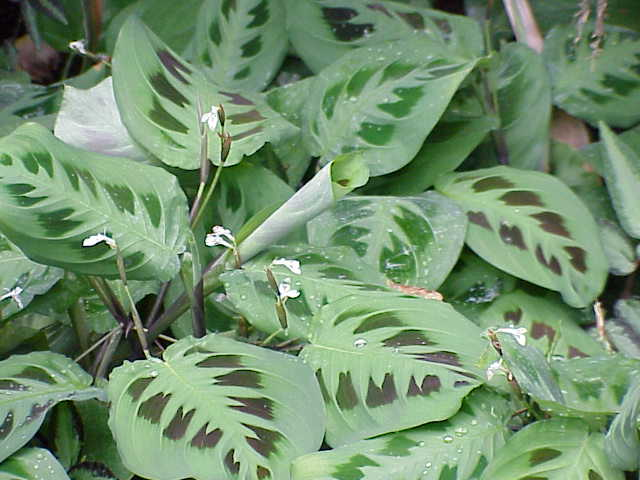
- Maranta leuconeura

Scientific classification
- Kingdom: Plantae
- Clade: Tracheophytes
- Clade: Angiosperms
- Clade: Monocots
- Clade: Commelinids
- Order: Zingiberales
- Family: Marantaceae
- Genus: Maranta; Plum. ex L.

Synonyms
- Allouya Plum. ex Aubl.; Hylaeanthe A.M.E.Jonker & Jonker; Koernickanthe L.Andersson

= Maranta (plant) =

Genus of flowering plants

Maranta is a genus of flowering plants in the family Marantaceae, native to tropical Central and South America and the West Indies. Maranta was named for Bartolomeo Maranta, an Italian physician and botanist of the sixteenth century.

About 40-50 species are currently recognized. They all have rhizomes and naturally form perennial clumps. The crowded oval, evergreen leaves are undivided with sheathing stalks. The leaves are flat by day and folded up as the day comes to an end, hence the common name "prayer plant" which attaches to the genus and its species - notably M. leuconeura. The flowers are small with three petals and two larger petal-like staminodes.

== Cultivation ==
Maranta arundinacea is cultivated to produce the edible starch arrowroot. Some species such as Maranta leuconeura (prayer plant) and M. arundinacea are grown as houseplants in a warmish house or conservatory environment. They can be propagated through cuttings (2 - 3 leaves) or by root division.

== Species ==
54 species are accepted.

- Maranta amazonica L.Andersson
- Maranta amplifolia K.Schum. in H.G.A.Engler (ed.)
- Maranta anderssoniana Yosh.-Arns, Mayo & M.Alves
- Maranta arundinacea L. (arrowroot, type species)
- Maranta bahiensis N.Luna & E.M.Pessoa
- Maranta bambusa F.Fraga
- Maranta bracteosa Petersen
- Maranta burchellii K.Schum. in H.G.A.Engler (ed.),
- Maranta chrysogina N.Luna & M.Alves
- Maranta cordata Körn.
- Maranta coriacea S.Vieira & V.C.Souza
- Maranta cristata Nees & Mart.
- Maranta cyclophylla K.Schum.
- Maranta divaricata Roscoe
- Maranta foliosa Körn.
- Maranta friedrichsthaliana Körn.
- Maranta furcata Nees & Mart.
- Maranta generans F.Fraga & J.M.A.Braga
- Maranta gibba Sm. in A.Rees
- Maranta gigantea N.Luna & E.M.Pessoa
- Maranta hatschbachiana Yosh.-Arns, Mayo & M.Alves
- Maranta hexantha (Poepp. & Endl.) D.Dietr.
- Maranta hoffmannii (K.Schum.) G.Fern. & N.Luna
- Maranta humilis Aubl.
- Maranta incrassata L.Andersson
- Maranta leuconeura E.Morren (prayer plant)
- Maranta lindmanii L.Andersson
- Maranta linearis L.Andersson
- Maranta longiflora S.Vieira & V.C.Souza
- Maranta lorifolia N.Luna & M.Alves
- Maranta nanica F.Fraga & J.M.A.Braga
- Maranta neopolystachya G.Fern. & N.Luna
- Maranta noctiflora Regel & Körn.
- Maranta orbiculata (Körn.) K.Schum.
- Maranta panamensis (Standl.) G.Fern. & N.Luna
- Maranta parvifolia Petersen
- Maranta phrynioides Körn.
- Maranta pilosissima F.Fraga, L.J.T.Cardoso & J.M.A.Braga
- Maranta pluriflora (Petersen) K.Schum.
- Maranta pohliana Körn.
- Maranta polystachya (K.Schum.) J.M.A.Braga
- Maranta protracta Miq.
- Maranta pulchra S.Vieira & V.C.Souza
- Maranta rugosa J.M.A.Braga & S.Vieira
- Maranta ruiziana Körn.
- Maranta rupicola L.Andersson
- Maranta sobolifera L.Andersson
- Maranta sophiana Yosh.-Arns, F.Fraga & J.M.A.Braga
- Maranta testudinea F.Fraga, M.T.C.Lacerda & J.M.A.Braga
- Maranta tuberculata L.Andersson
- Maranta unilateralis (Poepp. & Endl.) D.Dietr.
- Maranta vieirae N.Luna & E.M.Pessoa
- Maranta villosovaginata N.Luna & E.M.Pessoa
- Maranta zingiberina L.Andersson
