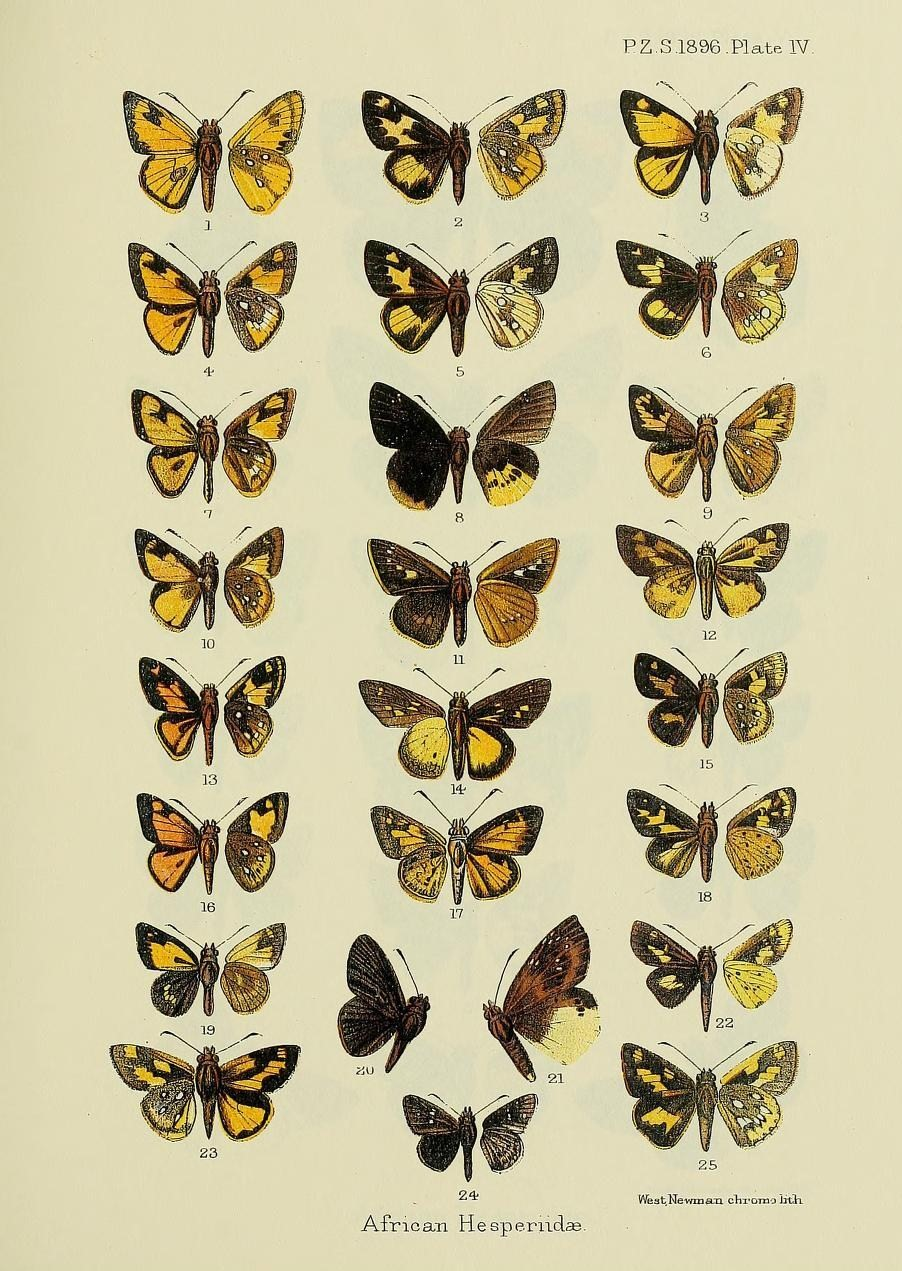
- Figure 16

Scientific classification
- Kingdom: Animalia
- Phylum: Arthropoda
- Clade: Pancrustacea
- Class: Insecta
- Order: Lepidoptera
- Family: Hesperiidae
- Genus: Osmodes
- Species: O. distincta

Binomial name
- Osmodes distincta Holland, 1896

= Osmodes distincta =

Species of butterfly

Osmodes distincta, the distinct white-spots, is a butterfly in the family Hesperiidae. It is found in Guinea, Sierra Leone, Liberia, Ivory Coast, Ghana, Nigeria, Cameroon, Gabon, the Republic of the Congo, the Democratic Republic of the Congo, Uganda and north-western Tanzania. The habitat consists of wetter forests.

The larvae feed on Marantochloa species.

Torben Larsen developed a species numbering system for his 2005 publication Butterflies of West Africa. This species is #1329. The 'Larsen' numbers have since been used with permission in A Sharp Eye on Butterflies of Ghana.
