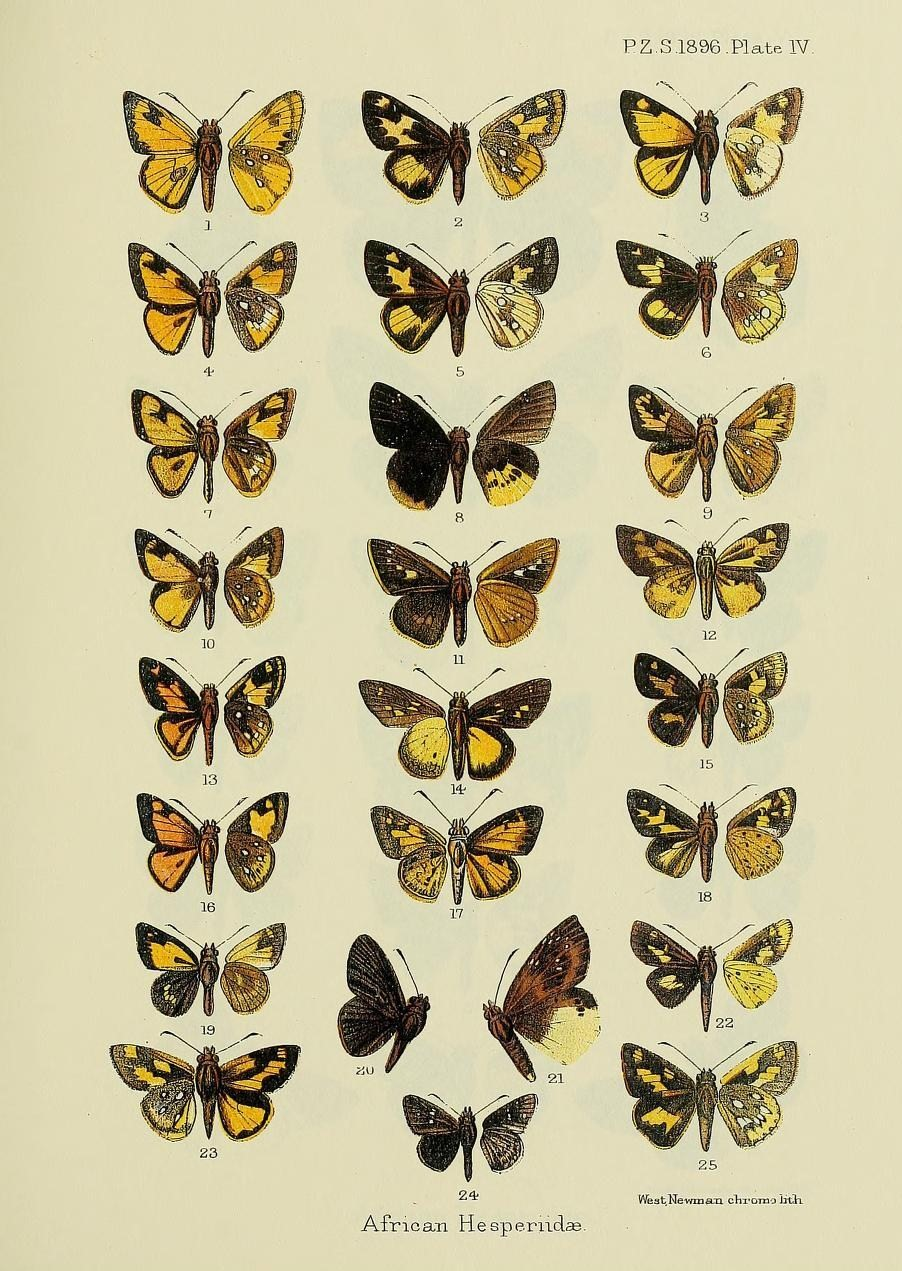
- 'Figure 10

Scientific classification
- Domain: Eukaryota
- Kingdom: Animalia
- Phylum: Arthropoda
- Class: Insecta
- Order: Lepidoptera
- Family: Hesperiidae
- Genus: Osmodes
- Species: O. adosus

Binomial name
- Osmodes adosus (Mabille, 1890)

Synonyms
- Pamphila adosus Mabille, 1890; Pamphila argenteipuncta Mabille; Holland, 1896; Osmodes argenteigutta Holland, 1896; Osmodes schultzei Aurivillius, 1925

= Osmodes adosus =

Species of butterfly

Osmodes adosus, the adosus white-spots, is a butterfly in the family Hesperiidae. It is found in Sierra Leone, Liberia, Ivory Coast, Ghana, Nigeria, Cameroon, Gabon, the Republic of the Congo, the Democratic Republic of the Congo, Uganda and north-western Tanzania. The habitat consists of forests.

The larvae feed on Marantochloa species.
