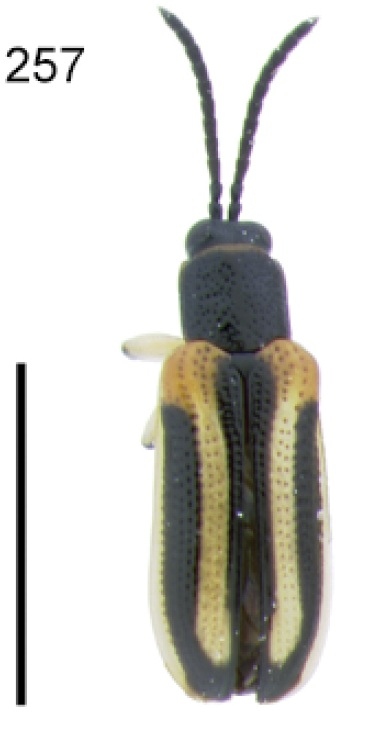

Scientific classification
- Kingdom: Animalia
- Phylum: Arthropoda
- Class: Insecta
- Order: Coleoptera
- Suborder: Polyphaga
- Infraorder: Cucujiformia
- Family: Chrysomelidae
- Genus: Cephaloleia
- Species: C. trivittata

Binomial name
- Cephaloleia trivittata Baly, 1885

= Cephaloleia trivittata =

Species of beetle

Cephaloleia trivittata is a species of beetle of the family Chrysomelidae. It is found in Costa Rica, Nicaragua and Panama.

== Description ==
Adults reach a length of about 4.1–4.4 mm. The head, antennae, pronotum (except for a pale anterior margin) and scutellum are black, while the elytron is yellow with three wide black vittae.

== Biology ==
Adults have been collected on Calathea haamelii, Cephaloleia macrosepala, Cephaloleia cleistantha, Cephaloleia gymnocarpa, Cephaloleia lutea, Cephaloleia venusta, Cephaloleia warscewiczii, Pleiostachya pruinosa, Cephaloleia pulverulentus, Cephaloleia marantifolia, Ctenanthe species, Donax canniformis, Marantochloa purpurea, Stromante jacquinii, Ischnosiphon elegans, Alpinia purpurata and Hedychium coronarium.
