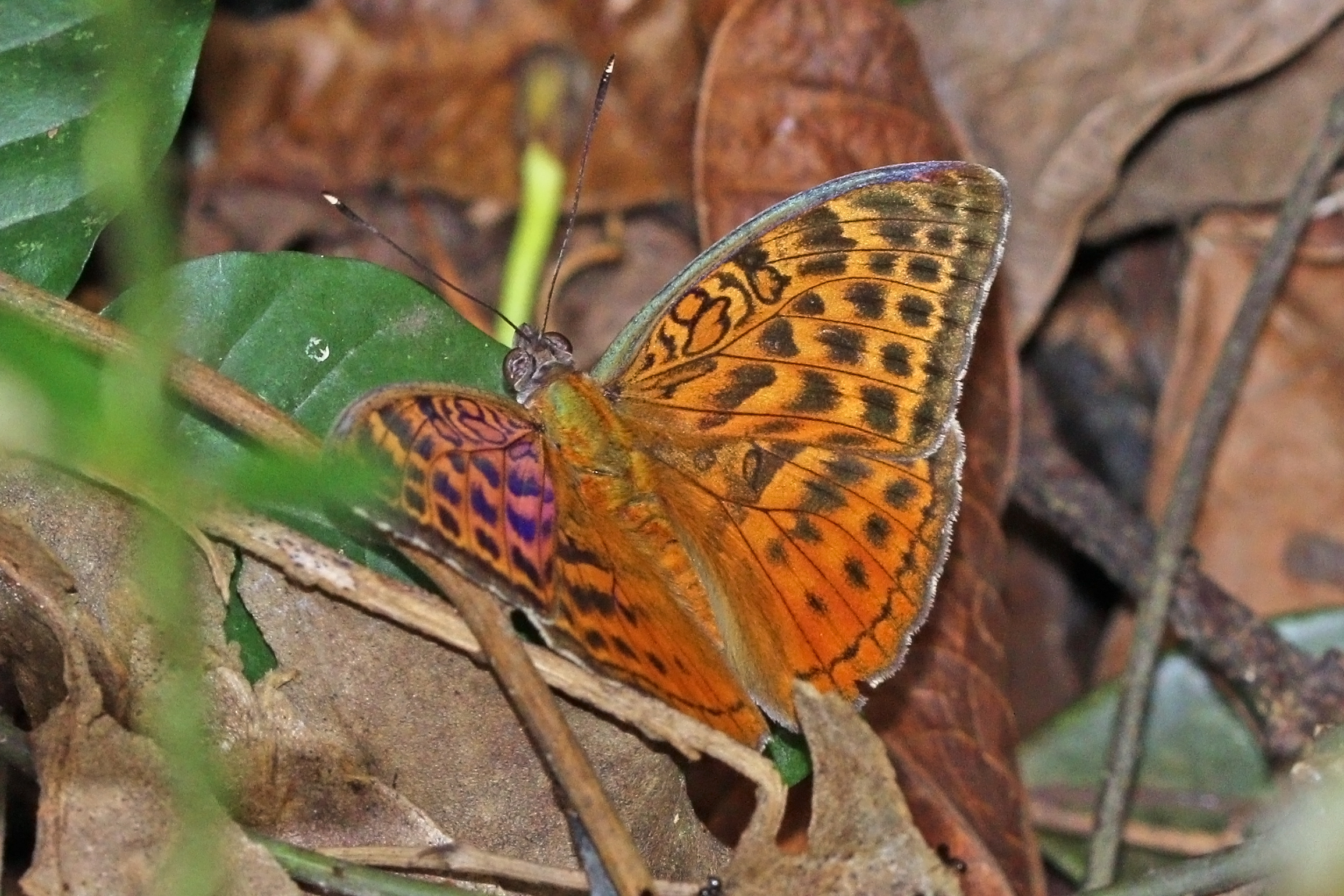
- Male; Kakum National Park, Ghana

Scientific classification
- Kingdom: Animalia
- Phylum: Arthropoda
- Clade: Pancrustacea
- Class: Insecta
- Order: Lepidoptera
- Family: Nymphalidae
- Genus: Bebearia
- Species: B. oxione

Binomial name
- Bebearia oxione (Hewitson, 1866)

Synonyms
- Euryphene oxione Hewitson, 1866; Bebearia (Apectinaria) oxione; Euryphene oxione squalida Talbot, 1928

= Bebearia oxione =

Species of butterfly

Bebearia oxione, the banded forester, is a butterfly in the family Nymphalidae. It is found in Sierra Leone, Liberia, Ivory Coast, Ghana, Togo, Nigeria, Cameroon, Gabon, the Republic of the Congo, Angola, the Central African Republic, the Democratic Republic of the Congo and Uganda. The habitat consists of forests.

E. oxione Hew. (41c) is distinguished by the black-brown, nearly straight, and very distinct transverse band on the underside; this extends from the apex of the forewing to the middle of the inner margin of the hindwing and is somewhat more sharply expressed on the hindwing than on the forewing. In the male, the ground-colour of the upper surface is dark yellow-brown, and the dark transverse bands are broad and continuous. The female is similar to the other females above [in its species group (see Bebearia genus)], but has the apex of the forewing very acute. Old Calabar to Angola and Toro.

Adults are attracted to fallen fruit.

The larvae feed on Marantochloa species, including M. purpurea.

== Subspecies ==
- Bebearia oxione oxione (Sierra Leone, Liberia, Ivory Coast, Ghana, Togo, Nigeria)
- Bebearia oxione squalida (Talbot, 1928) (Cameroon, Gabon, Congo, Angola, Central African Republic, Democratic Republic of the Congo, Uganda)

Torben Larsen developed a species numbering system for his 2005 publication Butterflies of West Africa. The nominate subspecies is #1003. The 'Larsen' numbers have since been used with permission in A Sharp Eye on Butterflies of Ghana.
