= Osmodes omar =

- male, Bobiri Butterfly Sanctuary, Ghana

Scientific classification
- Kingdom: Animalia
- Phylum: Arthropoda
- Clade: Pancrustacea
- Class: Insecta
- Order: Lepidoptera
- Family: Hesperiidae
- Genus: Osmodes
- Species: O. omar

Binomial name
- Osmodes omar C. Swinhoe, 1916

Species of butterfly

Osmodes omar, the obsolete white-spots, is a butterfly in the family Hesperiidae. The species was first described by Charles Swinhoe in 1916. It is widespread in tropical Sub-Saharan Africa (found in Guinea, Sierra Leone, Liberia, Ivory Coast, Ghana, Benin, Nigeria, Cameroon, the Republic of the Congo, the Central African Republic, the northern part of the Democratic Republic of the Congo, Uganda and north-western Tanzania).

The habitat consists of forests but also open degraded areas. The larvae feed on several species of Marantaceae: Marantochloa cuspidata, Thalia welwitschii, and Thaumatococcus daniellii.

Torben Larsen developed a species numbering system for his 2005 publication Butterflies of West Africa. This species is #1325. The 'Larsen' numbers have since been used with permission in A Sharp Eye on Butterflies of Ghana.
