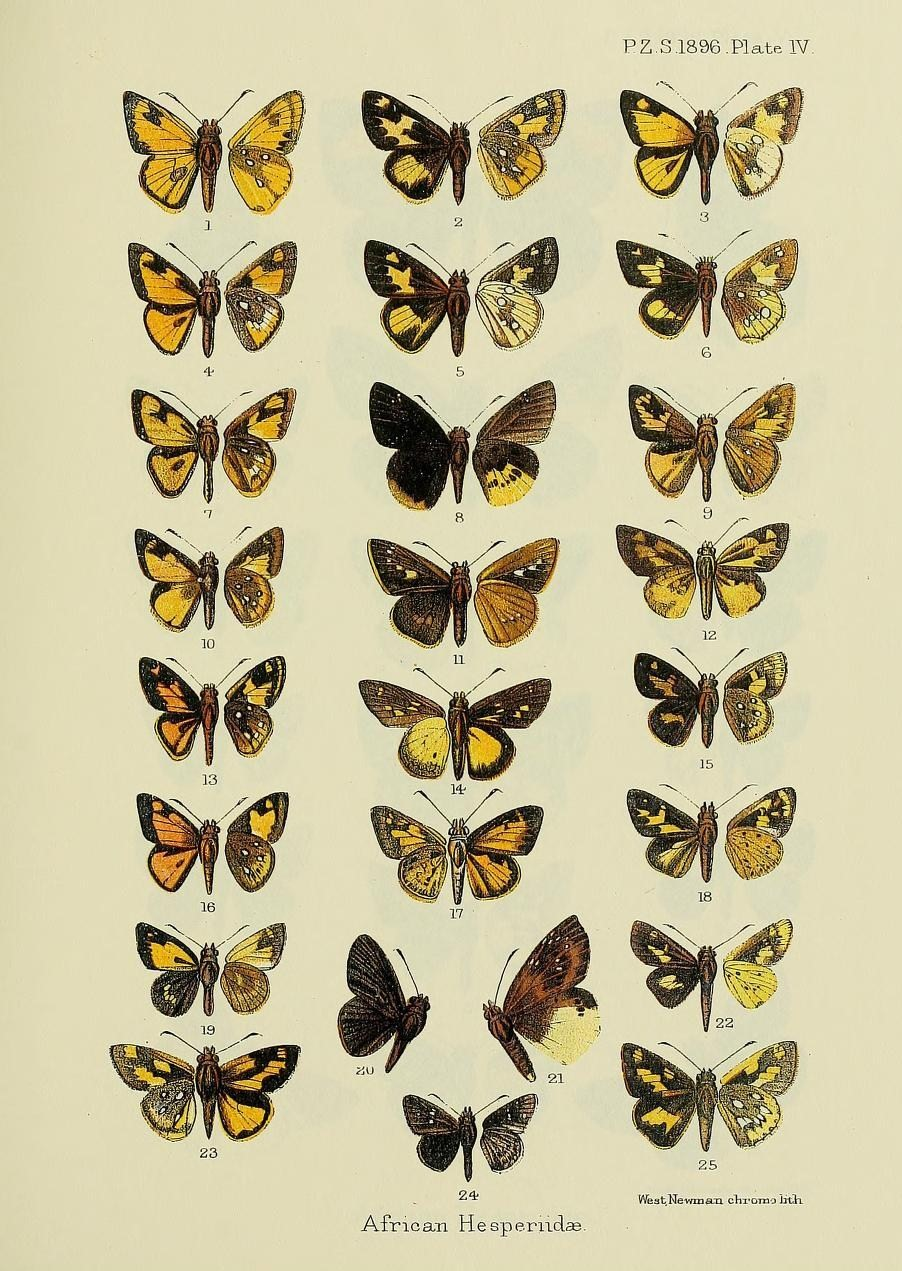
- A Preliminary Revision and Synonymic Catalogue of the Hesperiidae of Africa by William Jacob Holland ,1896

Scientific classification
- Kingdom: Animalia
- Phylum: Arthropoda
- Class: Insecta
- Order: Lepidoptera
- Family: Hesperiidae
- Tribe: Erionotini
- Genus: Osmodes; Holland, 1892

Synonyms
- Osmodes Watson, 1893

= Osmodes =

Genus of butterfly

Osmodes is an Afrotropical genus of grass skipper butterflies in the family Hesperiidae.

== Species ==
- Osmodes adon (Mabille, 1889)
- Osmodes adonia Evans, 1937
- Osmodes adonides Miller, 1971
- Osmodes adosus (Mabille, 1889)
- Osmodes banghaasii Holland, 1896
- Osmodes costatus Aurivillius, 1896
- Osmodes distincta Holland, 1896
- Osmodes hollandi Evans, 1937
- Osmodes laronia (Hewitson, 1868)
- Osmodes lindseyi Miller, 1964
- Osmodes lux Holland, 1892
- Osmodes minchini Evans, 1937
- Osmodes omar Swinhoe, 1916
- Osmodes thora (Plötz, 1884)
