= Clinogyne =

Genus of flowering plants

Clinogyne is a former genus of monocotyledonous plants, which have been moved to other genera. Its species included the following:

- C. canniformis, renamed Donax canniformis
- C. azurea, renamed Halopegia azurea
- C. blumei, renamed Halopegia blumei
- C. virgata, renamed Indianthus virgatus
- C. dichotoma (harvested for weaving into mats for use on beds and floors), Schumannianthus dichotomus
- Several species reclassified into genus Marantochloa
