= Osmodes costatus =

Scientific classification
- Kingdom: Animalia
- Phylum: Arthropoda
- Clade: Pancrustacea
- Class: Insecta
- Order: Lepidoptera
- Family: Hesperiidae
- Genus: Osmodes
- Species: O. costatus

Binomial name
- Osmodes costatus Aurivillius, 1896

Synonyms
- Osmodes cottoni Bethune-Baker, 1908

Species of butterfly

Osmodes costatus, the black-veined white-spots, is a butterfly in the family Hesperiidae. It is found in Guinea, Sierra Leone, Ivory Coast, Ghana, Nigeria, Cameroon, Gabon, the Republic of the Congo, the Central African Republic, the Democratic Republic of the Congo, Uganda and north-western Tanzania. Its natural habitat consists of forests.

Torben Larsen developed a species numbering system for his 2005 publication Butterflies of West Africa. This species is #1334. The 'Larsen' numbers have since been used with permission in A Sharp Eye on Butterflies of Ghana.
