= Osmodes adonides =

Scientific classification
- Domain: Eukaryota
- Kingdom: Animalia
- Phylum: Arthropoda
- Class: Insecta
- Order: Lepidoptera
- Family: Hesperiidae
- Genus: Osmodes
- Species: O. adonides

Binomial name
- Osmodes adonides Miller, 1971

Species of butterfly

Osmodes adonides is a butterfly in the family Hesperiidae. It is found in Gabon.
