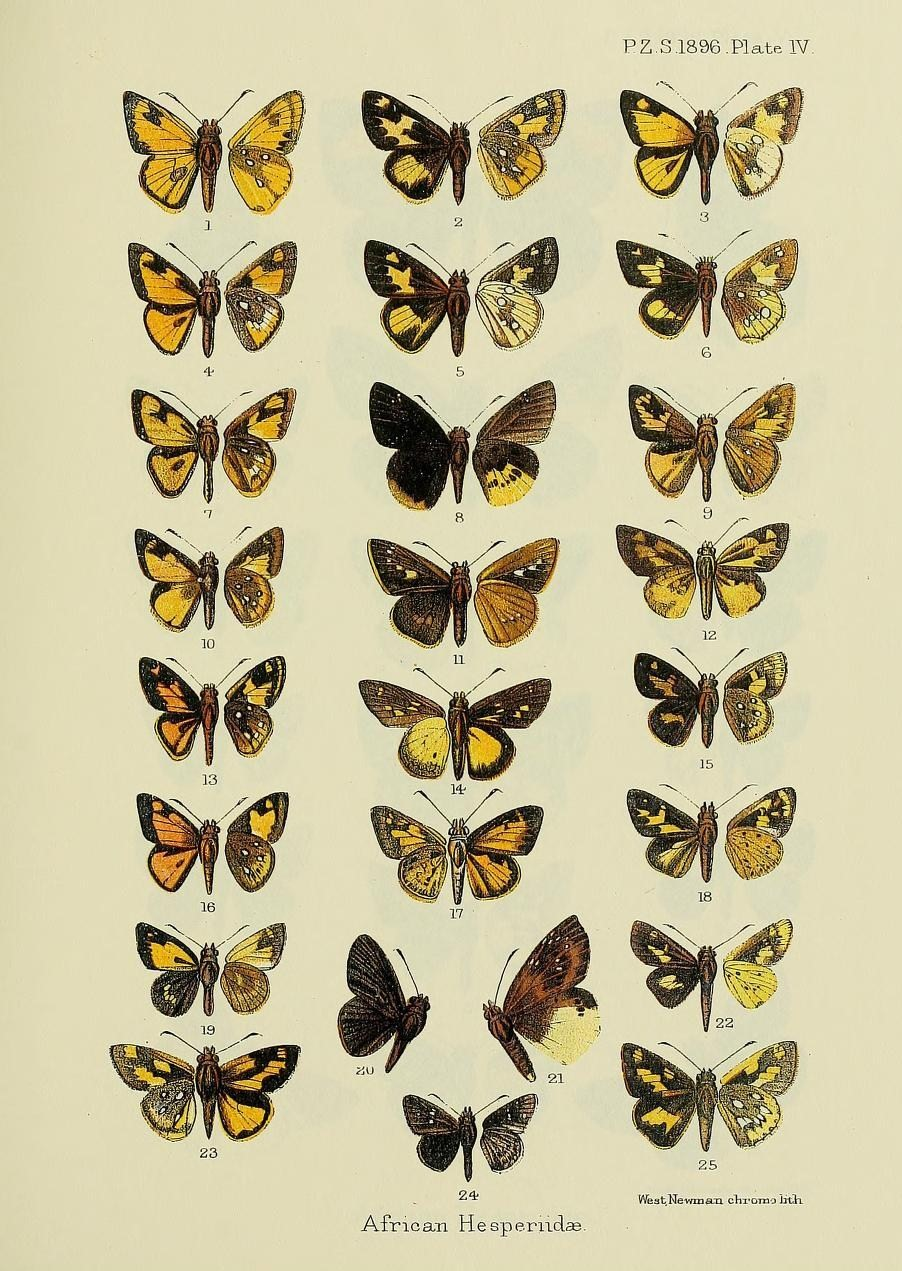
- Figure 13 male, figure 15 female

Scientific classification
- Domain: Eukaryota
- Kingdom: Animalia
- Phylum: Arthropoda
- Class: Insecta
- Order: Lepidoptera
- Family: Hesperiidae
- Genus: Osmodes
- Species: O. adon

Binomial name
- Osmodes adon (Mabille, 1890)

Synonyms
- Pamphila adon Mabille, 1890; Osmodes barombina Neustetter, 1916; Osmodes adon noda Evans, 1951; Osmodes maesseni Miller, 1971

= Osmodes adon =

Species of butterfly

Osmodes adon, the Adon white-spots, is a butterfly in the family Hesperiidae. It is found in Guinea, Sierra Leone, Ivory Coast, Ghana, Nigeria, Cameroon, the Democratic Republic of the Congo and north-western Tanzania. The habitat consists of forests.
