= Osmodes minchini =

Scientific classification
- Kingdom: Animalia
- Phylum: Arthropoda
- Class: Insecta
- Order: Lepidoptera
- Family: Hesperiidae
- Genus: Osmodes
- Species: O. minchini

Binomial name
- Osmodes minchini Evans, 1937

Species of butterfly

Osmodes minchini, the Entebbe white-spots, is a butterfly in the family Hesperiidae. It is endemic to Uganda.
