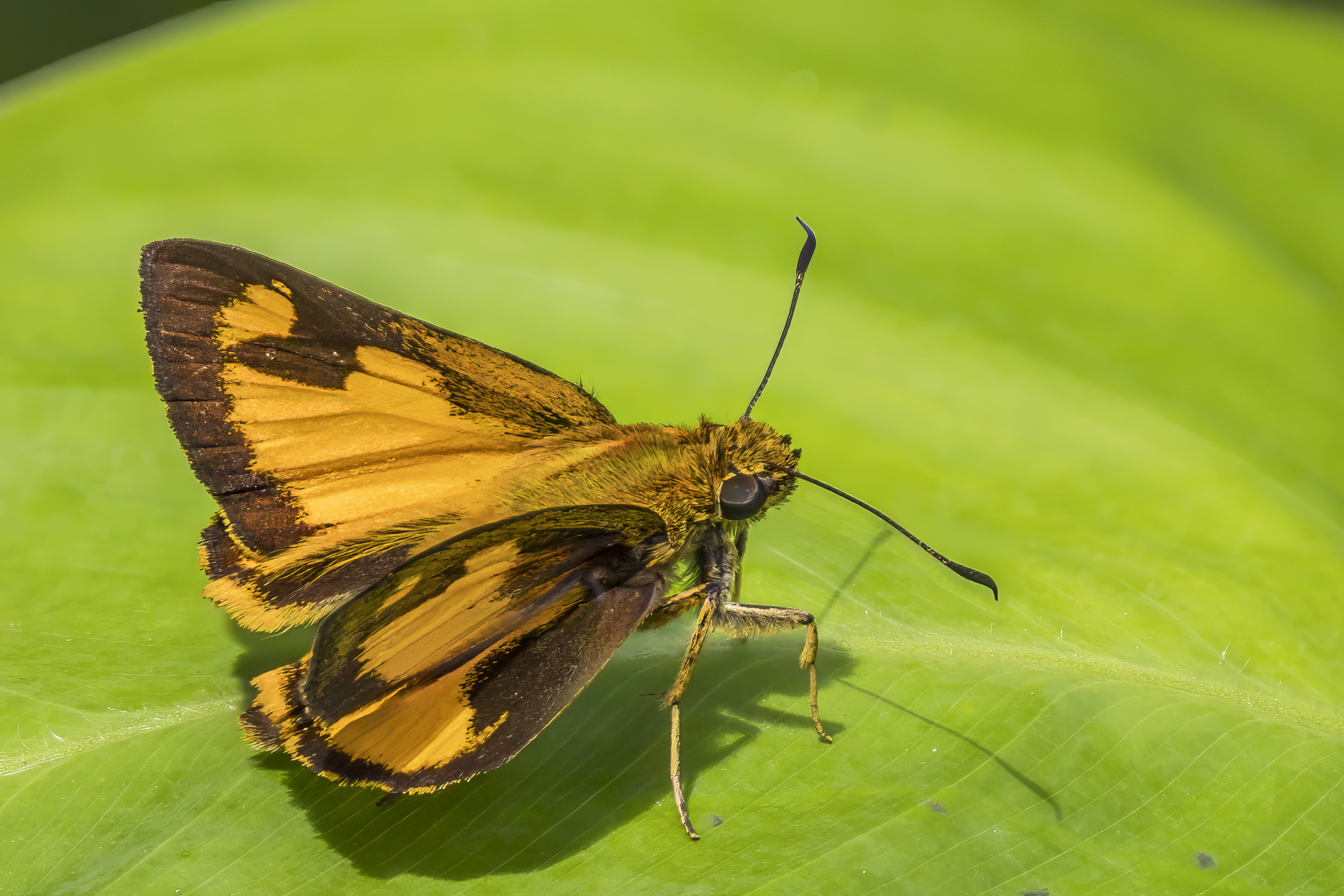
- male, Ghana
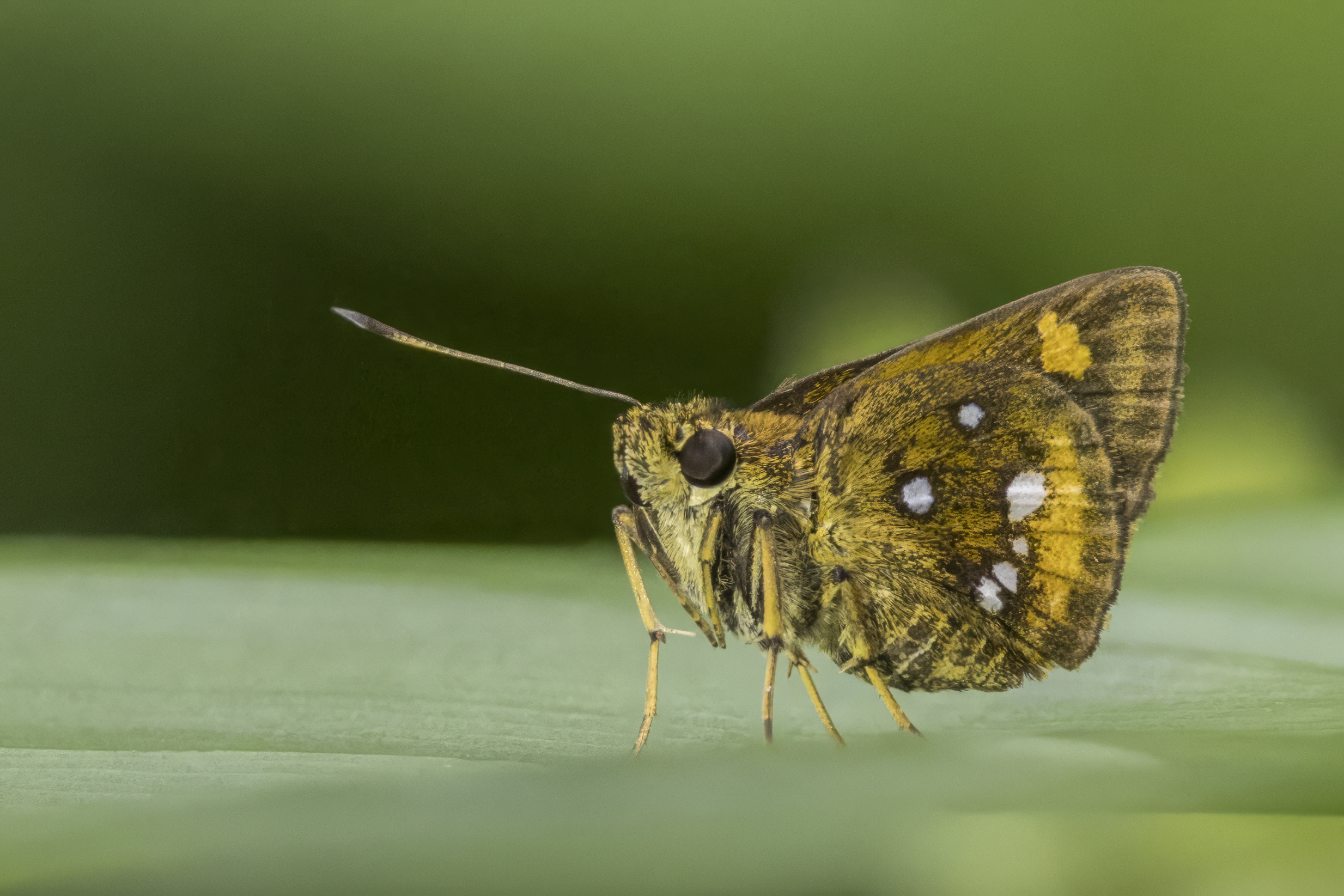
- female, Ghana

Scientific classification
- Kingdom: Animalia
- Phylum: Arthropoda
- Clade: Pancrustacea
- Class: Insecta
- Order: Lepidoptera
- Family: Hesperiidae
- Genus: Osmodes
- Species: O. thora

Binomial name
- Osmodes thora (Plötz, 1884)

Synonyms
- Plastingia thora Plötz, 1884; Pamphila chrysauge Mabille, 1891; Osmodes thops Holland, 1896

= Osmodes thora =

Species of butterfly

Osmodes thora, the common white-spots, is a butterfly in the family Hesperiidae. It is found in Guinea, Sierra Leone, Liberia, Ivory Coast, Ghana, Togo, Nigeria, Cameroon, the Republic of the Congo, Angola, the Central African Republic, the Democratic Republic of the Congo, southern Sudan, Uganda, western Kenya and western Tanzania. The habitat consists of forests.

Torben Larsen developed a species numbering system for his 2005 publication Butterflies of West Africa. This species is #1328. The 'Larsen' numbers have since been used with permission in A Sharp Eye on Butterflies of Ghana.
