= Marantochloa mildbraedii =

Conservation status
- Endangered (IUCN 3.1)

Scientific classification
- Kingdom: Plantae
- Clade: Tracheophytes
- Clade: Angiosperms
- Clade: Monocots
- Clade: Commelinids
- Order: Zingiberales
- Family: Marantaceae
- Genus: Marantochloa
- Species: M. mildbraedii

Binomial name
- Marantochloa mildbraedii Loes. ex Koechlin

Species of flowering plant

Marantochloa mildbraedii is a species of plant in the Marantaceae family. It is found in Cameroon, Central African Republic, Equatorial Guinea, Republic of Congo (Brazzaville) and Gabon. Its natural habitat is subtropical or tropical moist lowland forests. It is threatened by habitat loss.
