= Osmodes lindseyi =

Scientific classification
- Kingdom: Animalia
- Phylum: Arthropoda
- Clade: Pancrustacea
- Class: Insecta
- Order: Lepidoptera
- Family: Hesperiidae
- Genus: Osmodes
- Species: O. lindseyi

Binomial name
- Osmodes lindseyi Miller, 1964

Species of butterfly

Osmodes lindseyi, the black-tufted white-spots, is a butterfly in the family Hesperiidae. It is found in Guinea, Sierra Leone, Liberia, Ivory Coast, Ghana, Nigeria, Cameroon, Gabon and the Central African Republic. The habitat consists of forests and secondary growth with a full canopy.

== Subspecies ==
- Osmodes lindseyi lindseyi (Nigeria, Cameroon, Gabon, Central African Republic)
- Osmodes lindseyi occidentalis Miller, 1971 (Guinea, Sierra Leone, Liberia, Ivory Coast, Ghana)

Torben Larsen developed a species numbering system for his 2005 publication Butterflies of West Africa. This species is #1333. The 'Larsen' numbers have since been used with permission in A Sharp Eye on Butterflies of Ghana.
