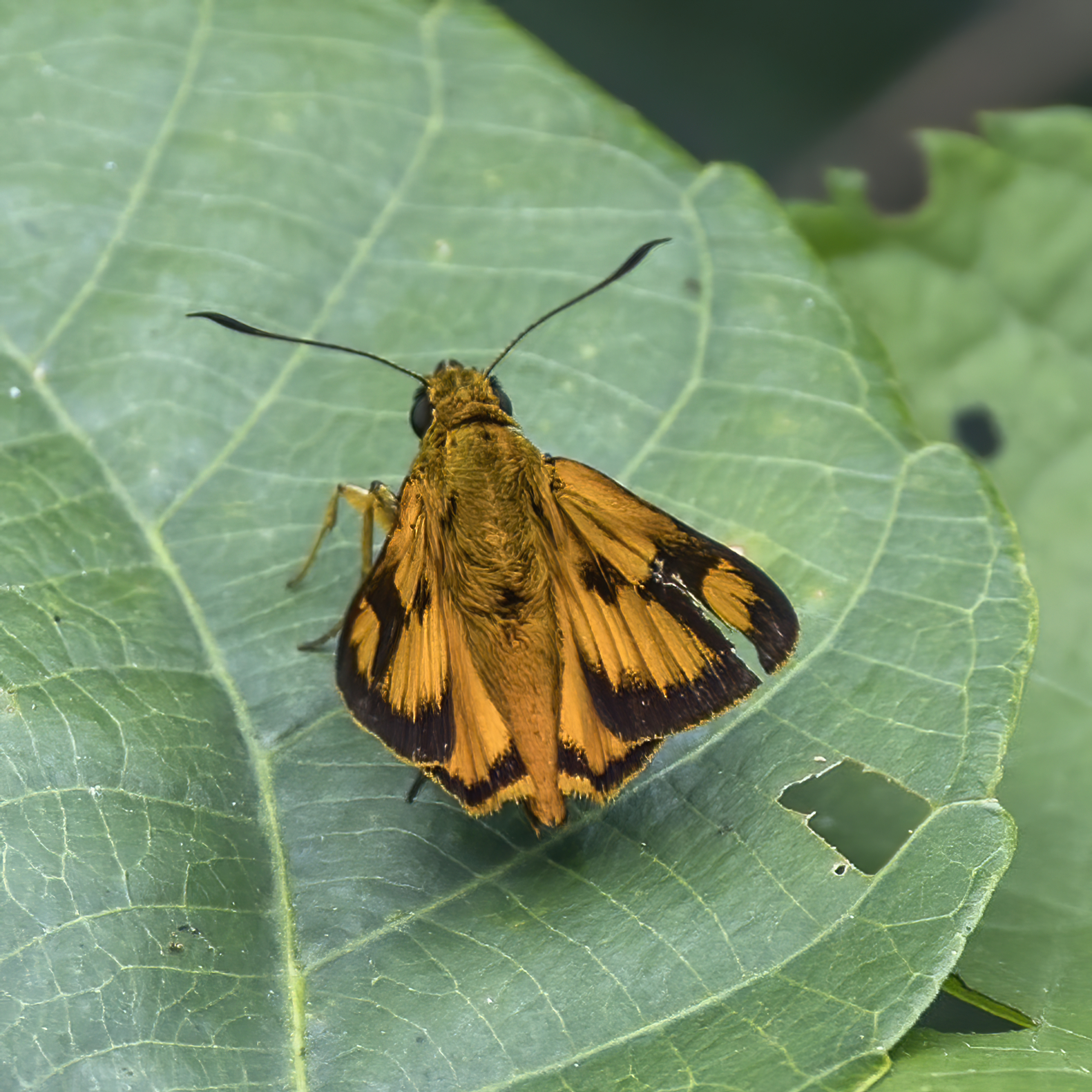
- male, Ghana

Scientific classification
- Kingdom: Animalia
- Phylum: Arthropoda
- Clade: Pancrustacea
- Class: Insecta
- Order: Lepidoptera
- Family: Hesperiidae
- Genus: Osmodes
- Species: O. lux

Binomial name
- Osmodes lux Holland, 1892

= Osmodes lux =

Species of butterfly

Osmodes lux, the detached white-spots, is a butterfly in the family Hesperiidae. It is found in Sierra Leone, Liberia, Ivory Coast, Ghana, Nigeria, Cameroon, Equatorial Guinea, Gabon, the Republic of the Congo, the Central African Republic, the Democratic Republic of the Congo and western Uganda. The habitat consists of wetter forests.

Torben Larsen developed a species numbering system for his 2005 publication Butterflies of West Africa. This species is #1326. The 'Larsen' numbers have since been used with permission in A Sharp Eye on Butterflies of Ghana.
