= Osmodes hollandi =

Scientific classification
- Domain: Eukaryota
- Kingdom: Animalia
- Phylum: Arthropoda
- Class: Insecta
- Order: Lepidoptera
- Family: Hesperiidae
- Genus: Osmodes
- Species: O. hollandi

Binomial name
- Osmodes hollandi Evans, 1937

Species of butterfly

Osmodes hollandi, or Holland's white-spots, is a butterfly in the family Hesperiidae. It is found in forests located in Nigeria (near the Cross River loop), Cameroon, Gabon, the Republic of the Congo, the Central African Republic, the Democratic Republic of the Congo, Uganda and north-western Tanzania.
