= Osmodes adonia =

Scientific classification
- Domain: Eukaryota
- Kingdom: Animalia
- Phylum: Arthropoda
- Class: Insecta
- Order: Lepidoptera
- Family: Hesperiidae
- Genus: Osmodes
- Species: O. adonia

Binomial name
- Osmodes adonia Evans, 1937

Synonyms
- Osmodes adon adonia Evans, 1937

Species of butterfly

Osmodes adonia, the Adonia white-spots, is a butterfly in the family Hesperiidae. It is found in Nigeria, Cameroon, Gabon, the Central African Republic, the Democratic Republic of the Congo, western Uganda and north-western Tanzania. The habitat consists of forests.
