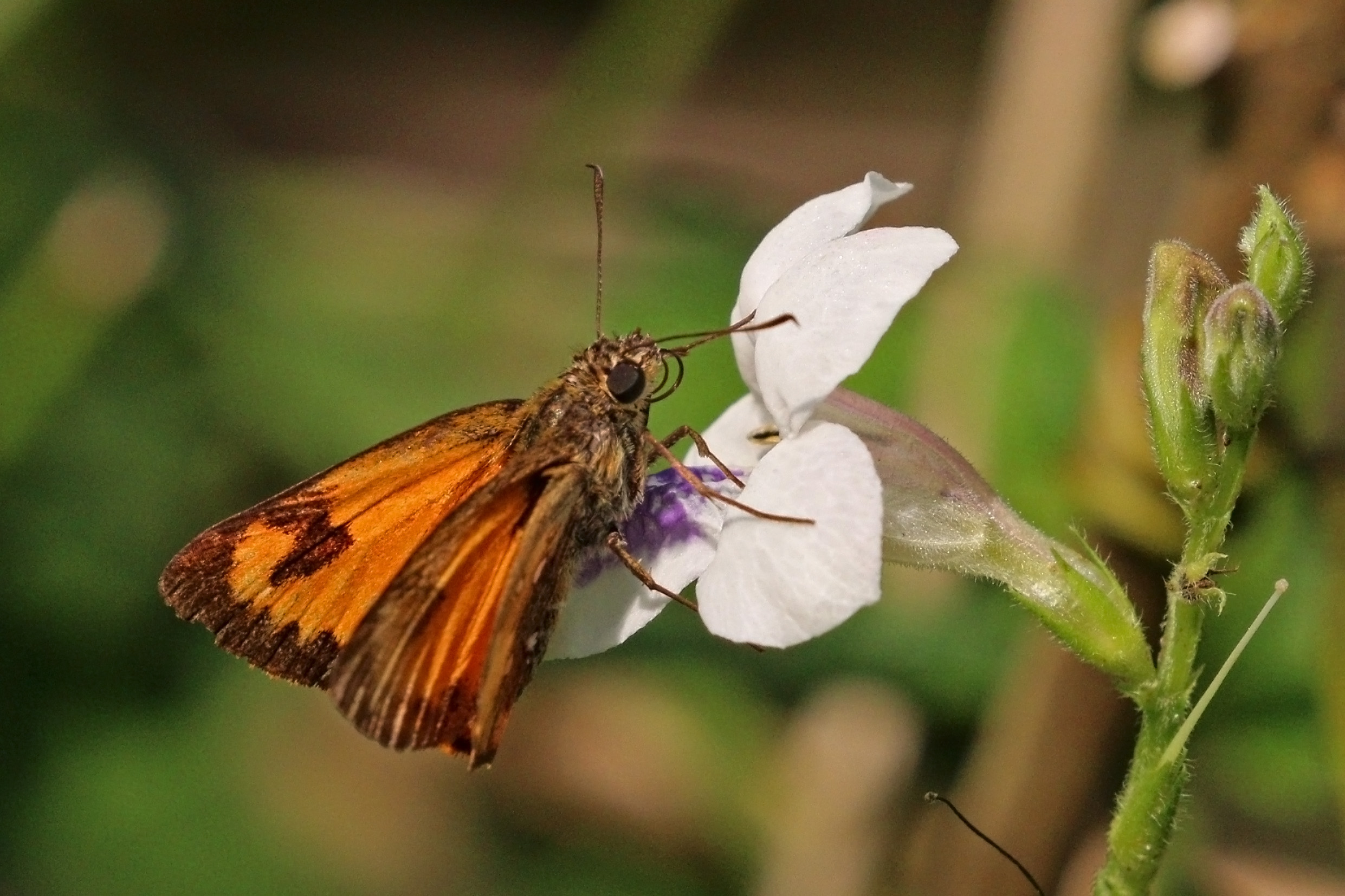

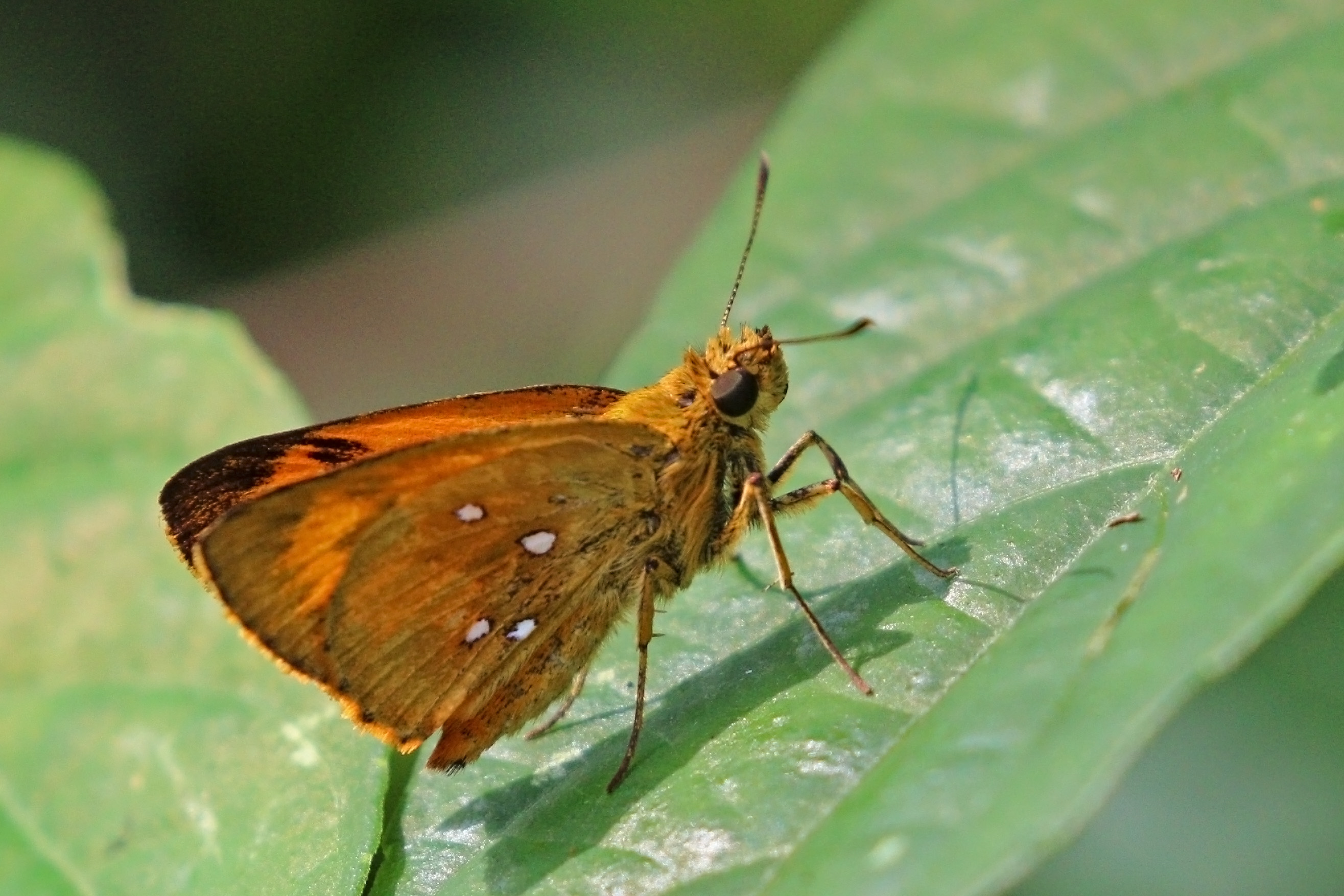
- Kibale Forest, Uganda

Scientific classification
- Kingdom: Animalia
- Phylum: Arthropoda
- Clade: Pancrustacea
- Class: Insecta
- Order: Lepidoptera
- Family: Hesperiidae
- Genus: Osmodes
- Species: O. laronia

Binomial name
- Osmodes laronia (Hewitson, 1868)

Synonyms
- Hesperia laronia Hewitson, 1868; Plastingia bicuta Mabille; Holland, 1896

= Osmodes laronia =

Species of butterfly

Osmodes laronia, the large white-spots, is a butterfly in the family Hesperiidae. It is found in Guinea, Sierra Leone, Liberia, Ivory Coast, Ghana, Togo, Nigeria, Cameroon, Gabon, the Central African Republic, the Democratic Republic of the Congo, Uganda and western Kenya. The habitat consists of forests.

Adults of both sexes are attracted to flowers.

The larvae feed on Marantochloa cuspidata, Thalia welwitschii and Thaumatococcus daniellii.

Torben Larsen developed a species numbering system for his 2005 publication Butterflies of West Africa. This species is #1324. The 'Larsen' numbers have since been used with permission in A Sharp Eye on Butterflies of Ghana.
