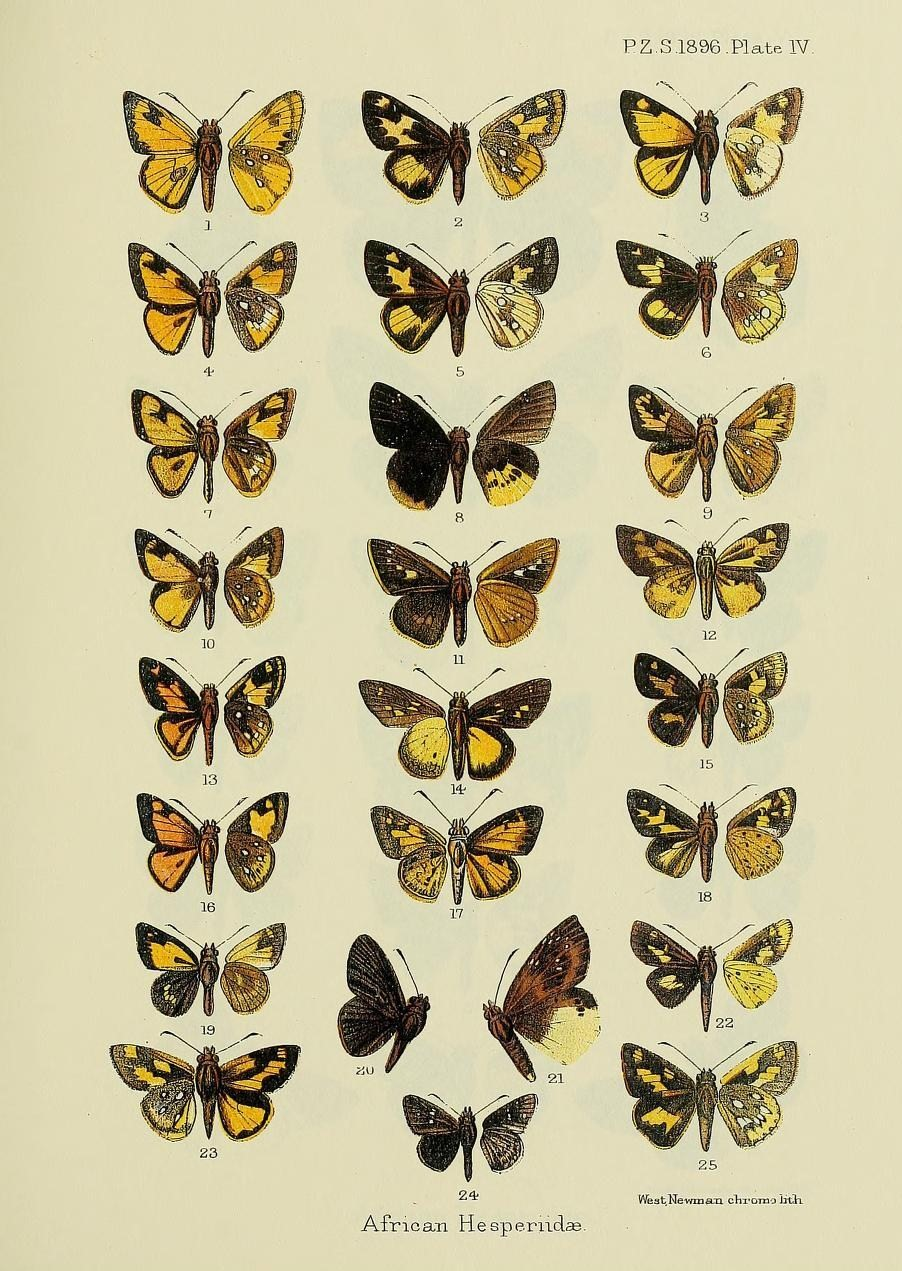
- Figure 9

Scientific classification
- Domain: Eukaryota
- Kingdom: Animalia
- Phylum: Arthropoda
- Class: Insecta
- Order: Lepidoptera
- Family: Hesperiidae
- Genus: Osmodes
- Species: O. banghaasii

Binomial name
- Osmodes banghaasii Holland, 1896

= Osmodes banghaasii =

Species of butterfly

Osmodes banghaasii, Bang-Haas' white-spots, is a butterfly in the family Hesperiidae. It is found in Ghana, the Republic of the Congo, the Central African Republic and north-western Tanzania. The habitat consists of wetter forests. The name honours the Danish entomologist Andreas Bang-Haas.
