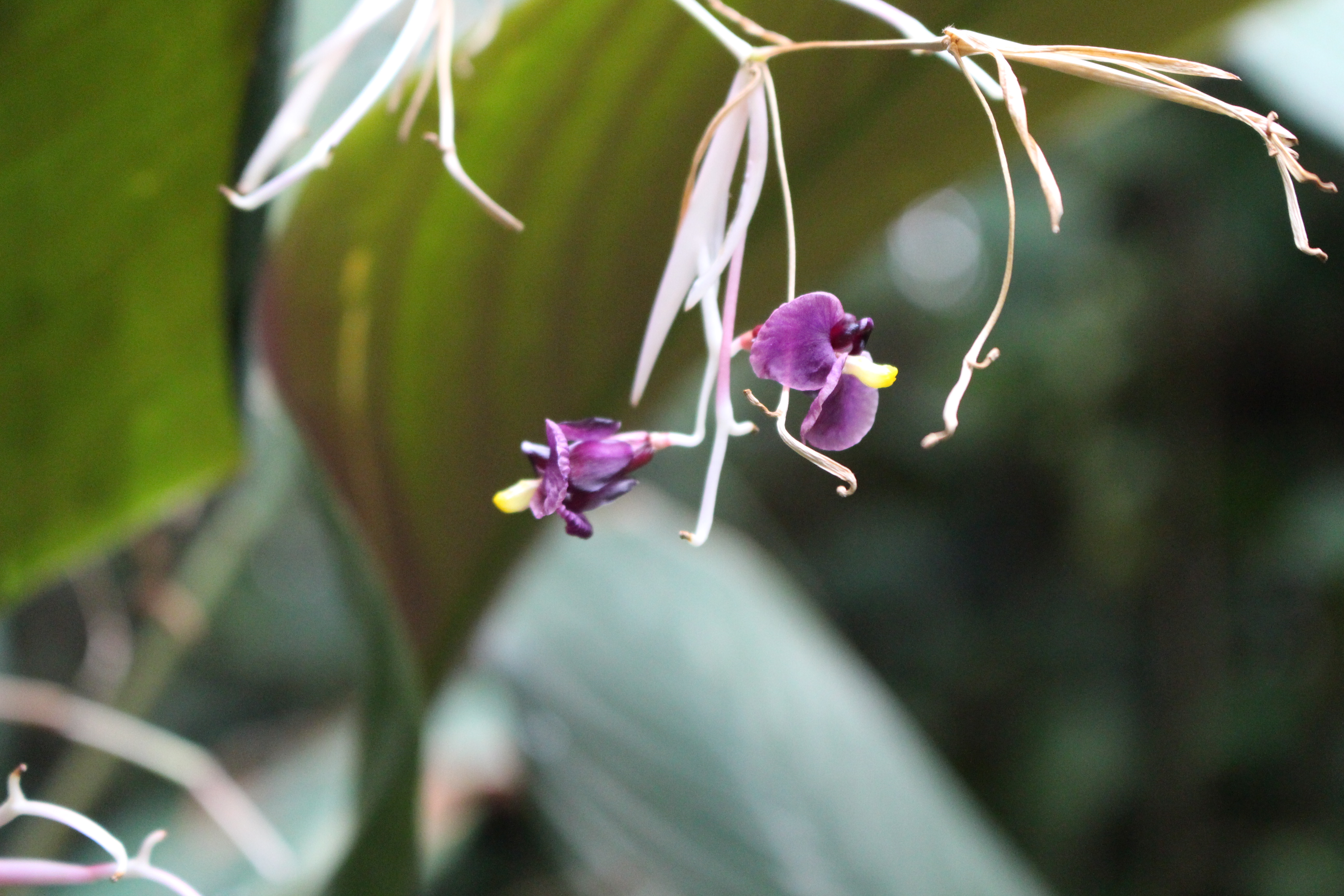

Scientific classification
- Kingdom: Plantae
- Clade: Tracheophytes
- Clade: Angiosperms
- Clade: Monocots
- Clade: Commelinids
- Order: Zingiberales
- Family: Marantaceae
- Genus: Marantochloa
- Species: M. purpurea

Binomial name
- Marantochloa purpurea (Ridl.) Milne-Redh.

= Marantochloa purpurea =

Species of flowering plant

Marantochloa purpurea is a species of plant in the family Marantaceae. It is found in tropical Africa, where its natural habitat is moist lowland forest. The leaf stems are used for various purposes including making string, baskets, mats and traps and the leaves are used for thatching, and for wrapping objects.

== Description ==
Marantochloa purpurea is a large, sometimes climbing, herb which grows to a height of 3 m (10 ft) or more. The much-branched stems grow from an extensive rhizome. The leaves are borne on petioles up to 80 cm (30 in) long, that sheath the stem for about half of their length. The leaf blades are large and ovate, but asymmetrical, with rounded bases and pointed tips, the under surfaces sometimes being purplish. The inflorescence is a lax, apical, branching panicle. In West Africa and in Angola, the flowers are purple, while plants growing in Uganda and Tanzania have pale pink flowers. The fruit is a red, three-lobed capsule containing three brown seeds.

== Distribution ==
Marantochloa purpurea is native to tropical and subtropical, sub-Saharan Africa, its range extending from Sierra Leone to South Sudan, Ethiopia and Uganda, and southward to Angola, the Democratic Republic of the Congo and Tanzania, at altitudes of up to 1,500 m (5,000 ft). It grows in both primary and secondary forests, and in swamp and gallery forest, as well as seasonally flooded areas, and even in moist conditions by the roadside.

== Uses ==
The stems of this plant are used for making cord for tying and plaiting, and in the making of baskets, mats and traps, and in the Democratic Republic of the Congo, the bark is used for similar purposes. The leaves are used for thatching and for wrapping objects; in West Africa, for wrapping cola nuts and preventing them from becoming desiccated, while in Central African Republic, for wrapping cassava cakes. The leaves are gathered from the wild and sold at markets. The pith from inside the stems is used to make brooms, and various parts of the plant are used in traditional medicine.
