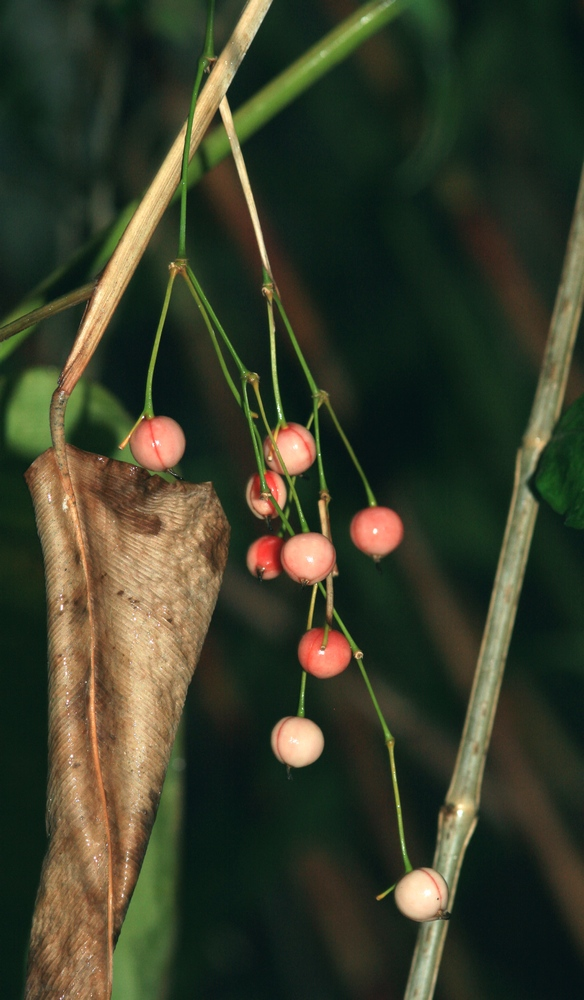
- Marantochloa leucantha

Scientific classification
- Kingdom: Plantae
- Clade: Tracheophytes
- Clade: Angiosperms
- Clade: Monocots
- Clade: Commelinids
- Order: Zingiberales
- Family: Marantaceae
- Genus: Marantochloa; Brongn. ex Gris

Type species
- Marantochloa comorensis Brongn. ex Gris

Synonyms
- Clinogyne Salisb. ex Benth.; Ataenidia Gagnep.

= Marantochloa =

Genus of flowering plants

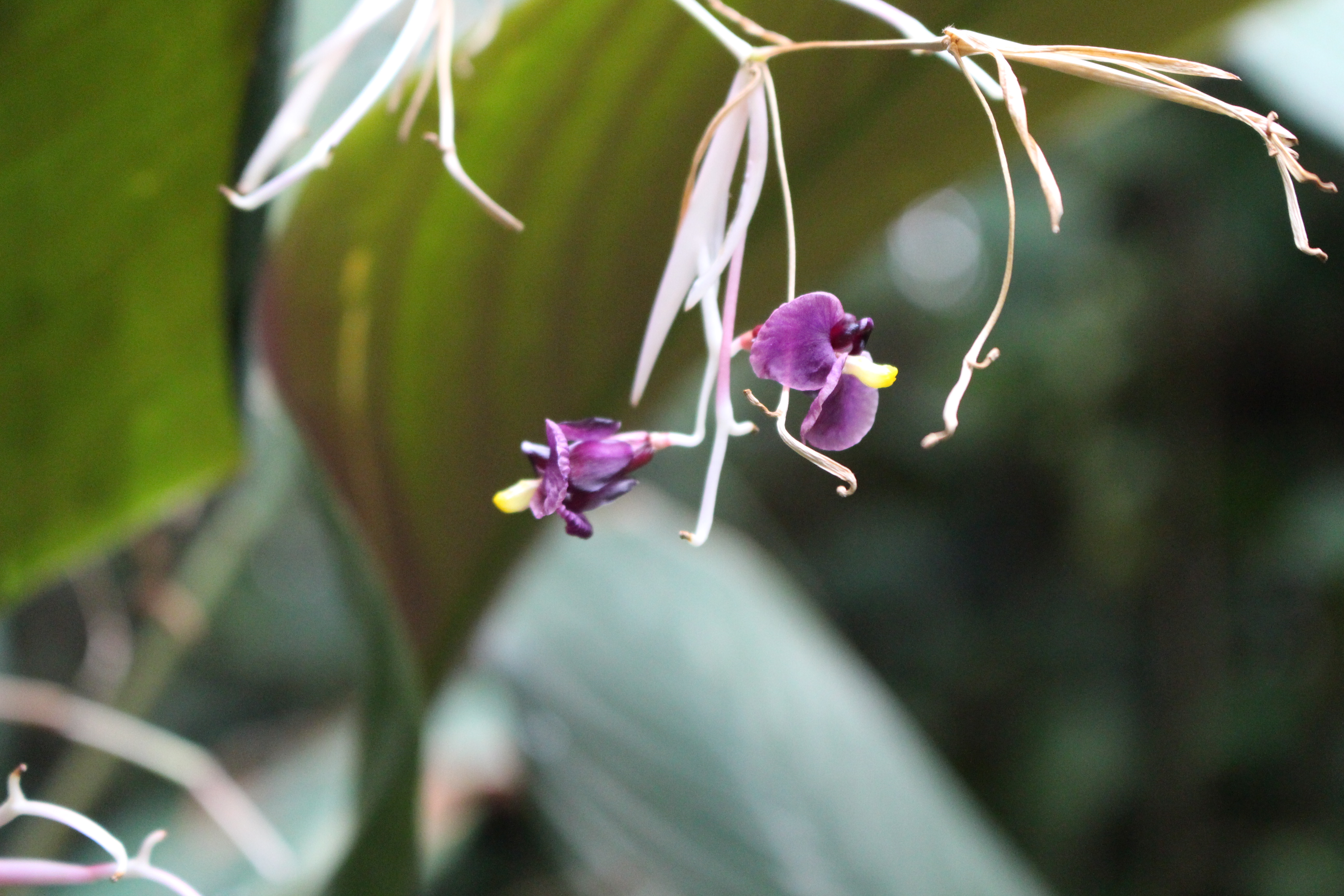
Flowers of Marantochloa purpurea

Marantochloa is a genus of plant in family Marantaceae described as a genus in 1860. It is native to tropical Africa and to islands in the Indian Ocean.

Species

- Marantochloa alba – Gabon
- Marantochloa comorensis – Comoros, Madagascar
- Marantochloa conferta – West and Central Africa
- Marantochloa congensis – West and Central Africa
- Marantochloa cordifolia – Central Africa
- Marantochloa cuspidata – West and Central Africa
- Marantochloa filipes – West and Central Africa
- Marantochloa grandiflora – Gabon
- Marantochloa incertifolia – Gabon
- Marantochloa leucantha – tropical Africa
- Marantochloa mannii – West and Central Africa
- Marantochloa microphylla – Gabon, Cabinda, Republic of the Congo
- Marantochloa mildbraedii – Gabon, Central African Republic, Republic of the Congo, Equatorial Guinea, Cameroon
- Marantochloa monophylla – West and Central Africa
- Marantochloa montsdecristalii – Gabon
- Marantochloa purpurea – tropical Africa
- Marantochloa ramosissima – West Africa
- Marantochloa sulphurea – Gabon
